= Eógan of Strathclyde =

Eógan of Strathclyde may refer to:

- Owain ap Dyfnwal (fl. 934), King of the Cumbrians
- Owain ap Dyfnwal (died 1015), King of the Cumbrians
- Owain Foel (fl. 1018), King of the Cumbrians
