= Owain of Strathclyde =

There were several kings of Strathclyde, Cumbria or Alt Clut whose names are sometimes given as Owain, Owen, Eógan and so on.

- Eugein I of Alt Clut (Eugein son of Beli) (7th century), king of Alt Clut who defeated Domnall Brecc at Strathcarron in 642
- Eugein II of Alt Clut (Eugein son of Dumnuagal) (8th century), king of Alt Clut
- Owain ap Dyfnwal (fl. 934), King of the Cumbrians
- Owain ap Dyfnwal (died 1015), King of the Cumbrians
- Owain Foel (fl. 1018), King of the Cumbrians
