= Máel Coluim, King of Strathclyde =

Máel Coluim
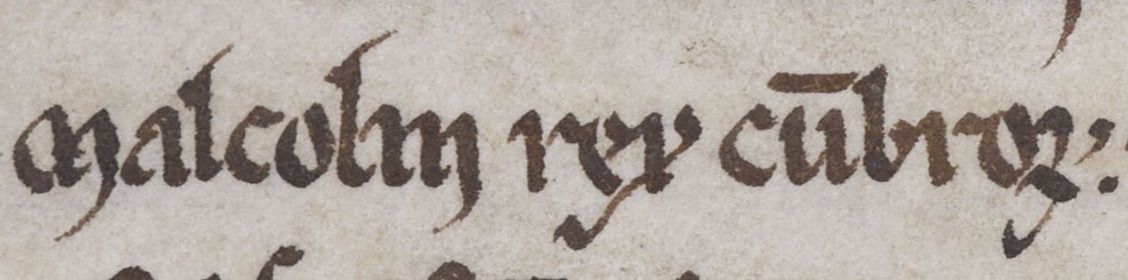
- Máel Coluim's name and title as it appears on folio 5v of British Library Cotton Domitian A VIII (De primo Saxonum adventu): "Malcolm rex Cumbrorum".

King of Strathclyde
- Predecessor: Dyfnwal ab Owain or Rhydderch ap Dyfnwal
- Successor: Owain ap Dyfnwal
- Died: 997
- Issue: Owain Foel?
- Father: Dyfnwal ab Owain

Máel Coluim (died 997) was a tenth-century King of Strathclyde. (Note: Since the 2000s academics have accorded Máel Coluim various personal names in English secondary sources: Mael Colaim, Máel Coluim, Mael Coluim, Maelcoluim, and Malcolm. Since the 2000s academics have accorded Máel Coluim various patronyms in English secondary sources: Máel Coluim mac Domnaill, and Malcolm ap Dyfnwal.) He was a younger son of Dyfnwal ab Owain, King of Strathclyde, and thus a member of the Cumbrian dynasty that had ruled the kingdom for generations. Máel Coluim's Gaelic name could indicate that he was born during either an era of amiable relations with the Scots, or else during a period of Scottish overlordship. In 945, the Edmund I, King of the English invaded the kingdom, and appears to have granted the Scots permission to dominate the Cumbrians. The English king is further reported to have blinded several of Máel Coluim's brothers in an act that could have been an attempt to deprive Dyfnwal of an heir.

It is unknown when Dyfnwal's reign came to an end. There is reason to suspect that a certain Rhydderch ap Dyfnwal was a son of his, and that this man ruled when he assassinated the reigning King of Alba in 971. Certainly by 973, Máel Coluim was associated with the kingship, as both he and his father are recorded to have participated in a remarkable meeting of kings assembled by Edgar, King of the English. The context of this assembly is not entirely clear. It could have concerned the stability of the border between the English realm and that of the Scots and Cumbrians. It could have also focused upon lurking threat of Vikings based in Dublin and the Isles.

Máel Coluim's father died in 975, having set off upon a pilgrimage to Rome. Quite when Máel Coluim succeeded Dyfnwal is uncertain. It could have been before, during, or after the assembly of 973. In any case, Máel Coluim's reign was evidently unremarkable, although the tenth-century Saltair na Rann preserves several lines of verse in his praise. Máel Coluim appears to have been succeeded by a brother, Owain. This man's successor, Owain Foel, seems to have been a son of Máel Coluim.

== Dyfnwal's sons and English aggression ==
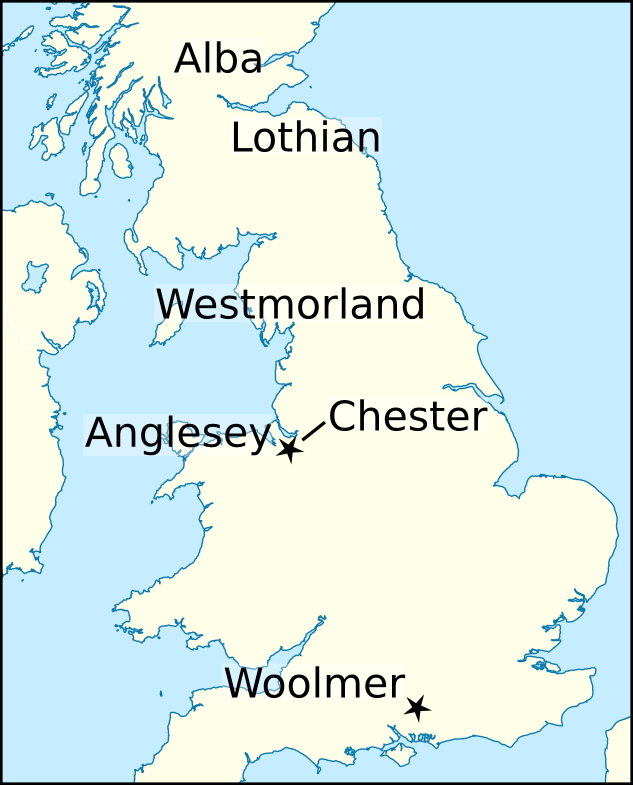
Locations relating to Máel Coluim's life and times.

Máel Coluim was a son of Dyfnwal ab Owain, King of Strathclyde, a man who ruled the Cumbrian Kingdom of Strathclyde from about the 930s to the 970s. Máel Coluim's name is Gaelic, and may be evidence of a marriage alliance between his family and the neighbouring Alpínid dynasty of the Kingdom of Alba. The name may also reveal that Máel Coluim was a godson of his northern namesake, Máel Coluim mac Domnaill, King of Alba, and could perhaps be indicative of Dyfnwal's submission to this Scottish king. (Note: The Gaelic personal name Máel Coluim means "servant of St Columba". This name was borne by Máel Coluim, son of the king of the Cumbrians, a man who appears to have been a member of the Strathclyde dynasty, and may well have been a descendant of Máel Coluim himself. The Welsh personal name Dyfnwal is a cognate of the Gaelic Domnall.)

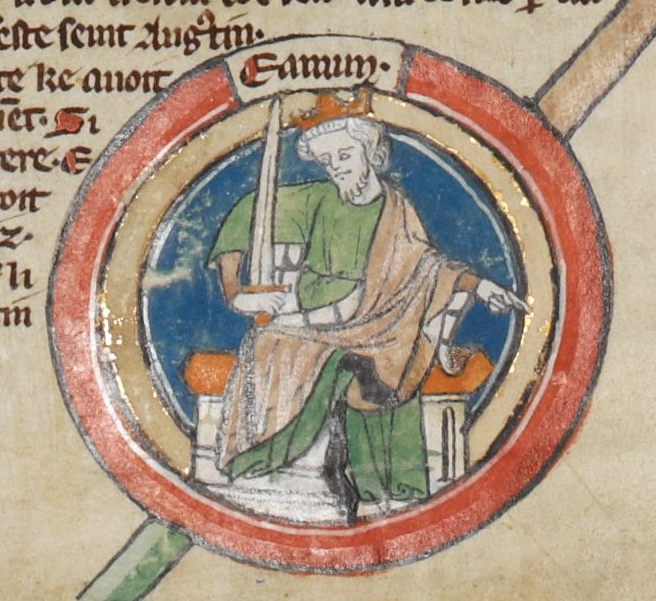
Depiction of Edmund I as it appears on folio 2r of British Library Royal 14 B VI.

In 945, the "A" version of the eleventh- to thirteenth-century Annales Cambriæ, and the thirteenth- and fourteenth-century Brut y Tywysogyon reveal that the Kingdom of Strathclyde was wasted by the English. The ninth- to twelfth-century Anglo-Saxon Chronicle offers more information, and relates that Edmund I, King of the English harried across the land of the Cumbrians, and let the region to Máel Coluim mac Domnaill. Similarly, the twelfth-century Historia Anglorum records that the English ravaged the realm, and that Edmund commended the lands to Máel Coluim mac Domnaill who had agreed to assist him by land and sea. According to the version of events preserved by the thirteenth-century Wendover and Paris versions of Flores historiarum, Edmund had two of Dyfnwal's sons blinded. If these sources are to be believed, they could reveal that the two princes had been English hostages before hostilities broke out, or that they were prisoners captured in the midst of the campaign. The ritual blinding of kings was not an unknown act in contemporary Britain and Ireland, and it is possible that Edmund may have meant to deprive Dyfnwal of a royal heir.

The gruesome fate inflicted upon Dyfnwal's sons could reveal that their father was regarded to have broken certain pledges rendered to the English. One possibility is that Dyfnwal was punished for harbouring insular Scandinavian potentates. Whatever lay behind the campaign, it could have been utilised by the English Cerdicing dynasty as a way to overawe and intimidate neighbouring potentates. Máel Coluim was probably a younger son of Dyfnwal, and not one of the sons mutilated by the English. The Gaelic name borne by Máel Coluim could indicate that he was born during a period of Scottish dominance over the Cumbrian realm, or that he was born during a time of relatively warm relations between the Scots and Cumbrians.

== Rhydderch and conflict with the Scots ==
The name of Rhydderch ap Dyfnwal as it appears on folio 8v of British Library Cotton Faustina B IX (the Chronicle of Melrose): "Radhardus".

After the death of Illulb mac Custantín, King of Alba in 962, the Scottish kingship appears to have been taken up by Dub mac Maíl Choluim, a man who was in turn replaced by Illulb's son, Cuilén. The latter's short reign appears to have been relatively uneventful. It nevertheless came to a violent end in 971, and there is reason to suspect that Cuilén's killer was a son of Dyfnwal. The ninth- to twelfth-century Chronicle of the Kings of Alba reports that the killer was a certain Rhydderch ap Dyfnwal, a man who slew Cuilén for the sake of his own daughter. The thirteenth-century Verse Chronicle, the twelfth- to thirteenth-century Chronicle of Melrose, and the fourteenth-century Chronica gentis Scotorum likewise identify Cuilén's killer as Rhydderch, the father of an abducted daughter raped by the Scottish king. Although there is no specific evidence that Rhydderch was himself a king, the fact that Cuilén was involved with his daughter, coupled with the fact that his warband was evidently strong enough to overcome that of Cuilén, suggests that Rhydderch must have been a man of eminent standing.

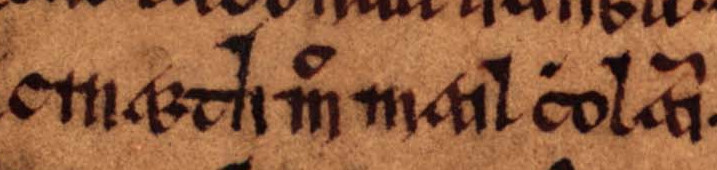
The name of Cináed mac Maíl Choluim as it appears on folio 15r of Oxford Bodleian Library Rawlinson B 488: "Cinaeth mac Mail Cholaim".

Cuilén seems to have been succeeded by his kinsman Cináed mac Maíl Choluim. One of the latter's first acts as King of Alba was evidently an invasion of the Kingdom of Strathclyde. This campaign could well have been a retaliatory response to Cuilén's killing, carried out in the context of crushing a British affront to Scottish authority. In any event, Cináed's invasion ended in defeat, a fact which coupled with Cuilén's killing reveals that the Cumbrian realm was indeed a power to be reckoned with. Whilst it is conceivable that Rhydderch could have succeeded Dyfnwal by the time of Cuilén's fall, another possibility is that Dyfnwal was still the king, and that Cináed's strike into Cumbrian territory was the last conflict of Dyfnwal's reign. In fact, it could have been at about this point when Máel Coluim took up the kingship. According to the Chronicle of the Kings of Alba, Cináed constructed some sort of fortification on the River Forth, perhaps the strategically located Fords of Frew near Stirling. One possibility is that this engineering project was undertaken in the context of limiting Cumbrian incursions.

== Máel Coluim and an assembly of kings ==
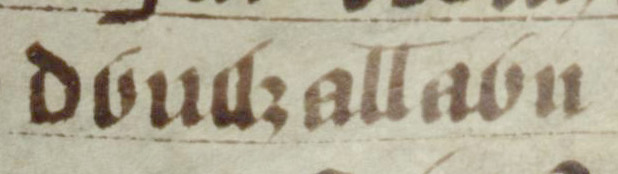
The name of Dyfnwal ab Owain as it appears on folio 59r of Oxford Jesus College 111 (the Red Book of Hergest): "dỽnwaỻaỽn".

There is evidence to suggest that both Máel Coluim and his father were amongst the assembled kings said to have convened with Edgar at Chester in 973. According to the "D", "E", and "F" versions of the Anglo-Saxon Chronicle, after having been consecrated king that year, this English monarch assembled a massive naval force and met with six kings at Chester. By the tenth century, the number of kings who met with him was alleged to have been eight, as evidenced by the tenth-century Life of St Swithun. By the twelfth century, the eight kings began to be named and were alleged to have rowed Edgar down the River Dee, as evidenced by sources such as the twelfth-century texts Chronicon ex chronicis, Gesta regum Anglorum, and De primo Saxonum adventu, as well as the thirteenth-century Chronica majora, and both the Wendover and Paris versions of Flores historiarum. (Note: Another source linking Dyfnwal and Máel Coluim to the assembly is the Chronicle of Melrose. If it was not Dyfnwal who attended the assembly, another possibility is that the like-named attendee was Domnall ua Néill, King of Tara.)

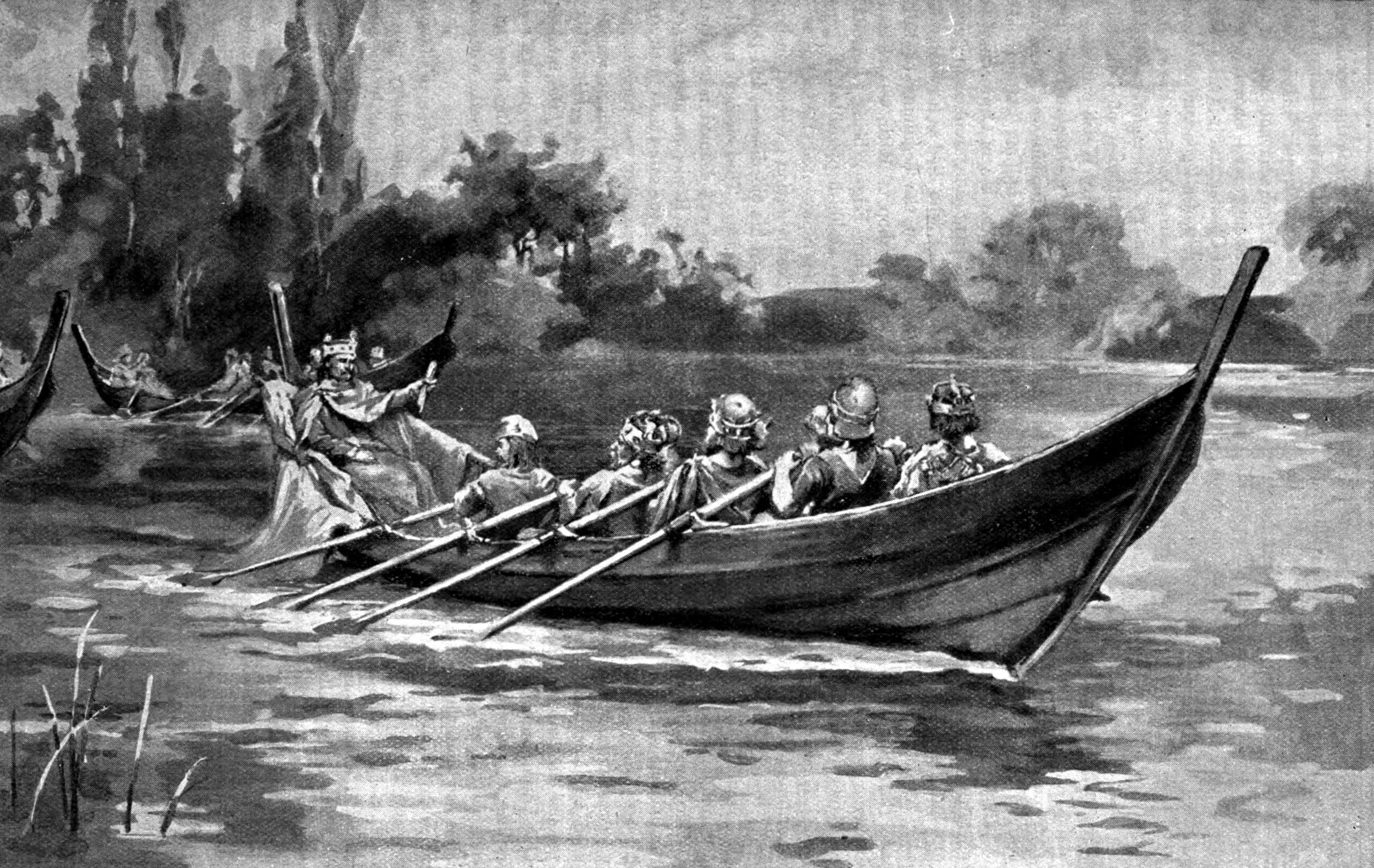
An early twentieth-century depiction of Edgar being rowed down the River Dee by eight kings. According to the Anglo-Saxon Chronicle, Edgar met six kings at Chester. By the twelfth century, chroniclers alleged that eight kings rowed Edgar down the river in an act of submission. One of these eight was Máel Coluim himself.

Whilst the symbolic tale of the men rowing Edgar down the river may be an unhistorical embellishment, most of the names accorded to the eight kings can be associated with contemporary rulers, suggesting that some of these men may have taken part in a concord with him. (Note: Two of the kings are accorded names of uncertain meaning.) Although the latter accounts allege that the kings submitted to Edgar, the Anglo-Saxon Chronicle merely states that they came to an agreement of cooperation with him, and thus became his efen-wyrhtan ("co-workers", "even-workers", "fellow-workers"). One possibility is that the assembly somehow relates to Edmund's attested incursion into Cumbria in 945. According to the same source, when Edmund let Cumbria to Máel Coluim mac Domnaill, he had done so on the condition that the latter would be his mid-wyrhta ("co-worker", "even-worker", "fellow-worker", "together-wright"). Less reliable non-contemporary sources such as De primo Saxonum adventu, both the Wendover and Paris versions of Flores historiarum, and Chronica majora allege that Edgar granted Lothian to Cináed in 975. If this supposed grant formed a part of the episode at Chester, it along with the concord of 945 could indicate that the assembly of 975 was not a submission as such, but more of a conference concerning mutual cooperation along the English borderlands. Although the precise chronology of Cumbrian expansion is uncertain, by 927 the southern frontier of the Kingdom of Strathclyde appears to have reached the River Eamont, close to Penrith. As such, the location of the assembly of 973 at Chester would have been a logical site for all parties. (Note: At about the same time as the assembly, De primo Saxonum adventu also notes that Edgar partitioned the Northumbrian ealdormanry into northern and southern divisions, split between the Tees and Myreforth. If the latter location refers to the mud flats between the River Esk and the Solway Firth, it would reveal that what is today Cumberland had fallen outwith Cumbrian royal authority and into the hands of the English.)

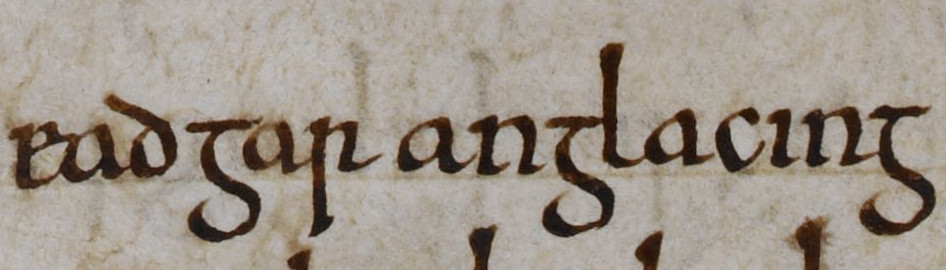
The name of Edgar as it appears on folio 142v of British Library Cotton Tiberius B I (the "C" version of the Anglo-Saxon Chronicle): "Eadgar Angla cing".

One of the other named kings was Cináed. Considering the fact that the Anglo-Saxon Chronicle numbers the kings at six, if Cináed was indeed present, it is unlikely that his rival, Cuilén's brother Amlaíb mac Illuilb, was also in attendance. Although the chronology concerning the reigns of Cináed and Amlaíb mac Illuilb is uncertain—with Amlaíb mac Illuilb perhaps reigning from 971/976–977 and Cináed from 971/977–995—the part played by the King of Alba at the assembly could well have concerned the frontier of his realm. One of the other named kings seems to have been Maccus mac Arailt, whilst another could have been this man's brother, Gofraid. These two Islesmen may have been regarded as threats by the Scots and Cumbrians. Maccus and Gofraid are recorded to have devastated Anglesey at the beginning of the decade, which could indicate that Edgar's assembly was undertaken as a means to counter the menace posed by these energetic insular Scandinavians. In fact, there is evidence to suggest that, as a consequence of the assembly at Chester, the brothers may have turned their attention from the British mainland westwards towards Ireland.

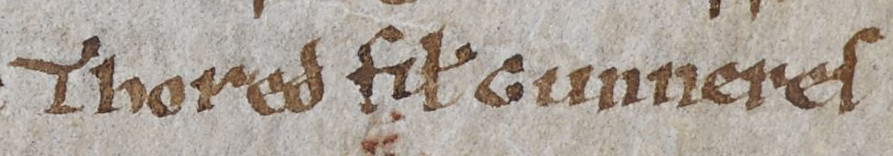
The name of Thored Gunnerson as it appears on folio 58v of British Library Cotton Domitian A VIII (the "F" version of the Anglo-Saxon Chronicle): "Thored filius Gunnerses".

Another aspect of the assembly may have concerned the remarkable rising power of Amlaíb Cúarán in Ireland. Edgar may have wished to not only rein in men such as Maccus and Gofraid, but prevent them—and the Scots and Cumbrians—from affiliating themselves with Amlaíb Cúarán, and recognising the latter's authority in the Irish Sea region. Another factor concerning Edgar, and his Scottish and Cumbrian counterparts, may have been the stability of the northern English frontier. For example, a certain Thored Gunnerson is recorded to have ravaged Westmorland in 966, an action that may have been undertaken by the English in the context of a response to Cumbrian southward expansion. (Note: According to the Life of St Cathróe, after Dyfnwal escorted Cathróe to the frontier of his realm, the latter was then escorted by a certain Gunderic to the domain of Erich at York. It is possible that Gunderic is identical to Thored's father, and identical to the Gunner who appears in charter evidence from 931–963.) Although the Scottish invasion of Cumbrian and English territory unleashed after Cináed's inauguration could have been intended to tackle Cumbrian opposition, another possibility is that the campaign could have been executed as a way to counter any occupation of Cumbrian territories by Thored.

== Máel Coluim's reign and death ==
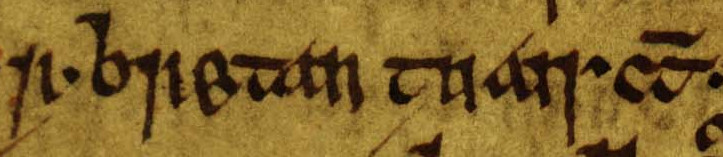
Máel Coluim's title as it appears on folio 15v of Oxford Bodleian Library Rawlinson B 488: "rí Bretan Tuaisceirt" ("king of the Britons of the north").

Both Dyfnwal and Edgar died in 975. According to various Irish annals, Dyfnwal met his end whilst undertaking a pilgrimage. Surviving sources fail to note the Cumbrian realm between the obituaries of Dyfnwal in 975 and Máel Coluim in 997. Quite when Dyfnwal ceased to possess the kingship is uncertain. On one hand, there is reason to suspect that Rhydderch possessed power in 971. On the other hand, it is also possible that Dyfnwal was still reigning in 973. In fact, this could have been the point when he ceded power to Máel Coluim: conceivably as a consequence of Rhydderch's assassination of Cuilén two years beforehand. Alternately, Dyfnwal may have retained royal control until setting off upon his pilgrimage. If correct, it could have been Edgar's death that precipitated this final trek, and the transference of the Cumbrian kingship to Máel Coluim. (Note: In fact, the upheaval caused by the absence of Dyfnwal and Edgar could well have contributed to Cináed's final elimination of Amlaíb mac Illuilb in 997.)

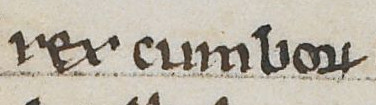
Máel Coluim's title as it appears on folio 9r of British Library Cotton Faustina B IX: "rex Cumbrorum". (Note: Only three rulers of the Kingdom of Strathclyde were styled King of the Cumbrians: Máel Coluim himself, Máel Coluim's father, and Máel Coluim's grandfather, Owain ap Dyfnwal.)

Máel Coluim's part in the assembly could have partly concerned his father's impending pilgrimage, and that he sought surety for Dyfnwal's safe passage through Edgar's realm. The fact that Máel Coluim is identified as one of the assembled kings could indicate that Dyfnwal had relinquished control to him at some point before the convention. Conversely, Máel Coluim's title could instead indicate that he merely represented his aged father, and acted as regent. Evidence that Máel Coluim had indeed assumed the kingship before the assembly may exist in the record of a certain Malcolm dux who witnessed an English royal charter in 970 at Woolmer. Although the authenticity of this document is questionable, the attested Malcolm could well be identical to Máel Coluim himself. (Note: This charter is composed of Latin and Old English text. The document may be evidence of Scottish and Cumbrian submission to the English. For example, one place the text reads in Latin: "I, Edgar, ruler of the beloved island of Albion, subjected to us of the rule of the Scots and Cumbrians and the Britons and of all regions round about ...". The corresponding Old English text reads: "I, Edgar, exalted as king over the English people by His [God's] grace, and He has now subjected to my authority the Scots and Cumbrians and also the Britons and all that this island has inside ...".) If Máel Coluim was indeed king in 973, Dyfnwal's role at the assembly may have been that of an 'elder statesman' of sorts—possibly serving as an adviser or mentor—especially considering his decades of experience in international affairs. (Note: If Máel Coluim was indeed king, the attestation of Malcolm dux would be the only record of a foreign king witnessing one of Edgar's charters.)

And Mael Coluim, with hundreds of deeds, before the hands of the land of the Britons, with the bright hospitality of every good battle, the good son of Domnall, son of Eogan.

— excerpt from Saltair na Rann praising Máel Coluim, and proclaiming his descent from Dyfnwal ab Owain and Owain ap Dyfnwal.

If Máel Coluim succeeded Dyfnwal, it could mean that Rhydderch—if he was indeed Máel Coluim's brother—was either dead or unable to reign as king. Whilst it is possible that the sons of Dyfnwal maimed by the English in 945 were still alive in the 970s, the horrific injuries endured by these men would have meant that they were deemed unfit to rule. Notwithstanding the uncertainties surrounding his accession, Máel Coluim's reign was evidently unremarkable. Certainly, no source records Scottish-Cumbrian political relations at about the inception of Máel Coluim's reign, although the fact that Dyfnwal left for Rome could be evidence that the latter did not regard the realm or dynasty to be threatened during his absence.

Máel Coluim—alongside contemporary Irish, English, and Frankish kings—is commemorated by several lines of panegyric verse preserved by the tenth-century Saltair na Rann. He died in 997, the same year as his northern counterpart, Custantín mac Cuiléin, King of Alba. Máel Coluim's demise is recorded by the Annals of Clonmacnoise, the Annals of Ulster, Chronicon Scotorum, and the Annals of Tigernach. The latter styles him "king of the north Britons". Máel Coluim seems to have been succeeded by a brother, Owain. The latter appears to have been succeeded by Owain Foel, a man who may well have been a son of Máel Coluim.

== Citations ==
Máel Coluim Died: 997
Regnal titles
Unknown Last known title holder: Dyfnwal ab Owain^{1}	King of Strathclyde	Succeeded by Owain ap Dyfnwal
Notes and references
1. Whilst it is possible that Máel Coluim succeeded Dyfnwal, another possibility is that Dyfnwal was earlier succeeded by Rhydderch ap Dyfnwal.
