= Owain ap Dyfnwal =

Owain ap Dyfnwal may refer to:

- Owain ap Dyfnwal (fl. 934), King of Strathclyde
- Owain ap Dyfnwal (died 1015), possible King of Strathclyde
