= Owain Foel =

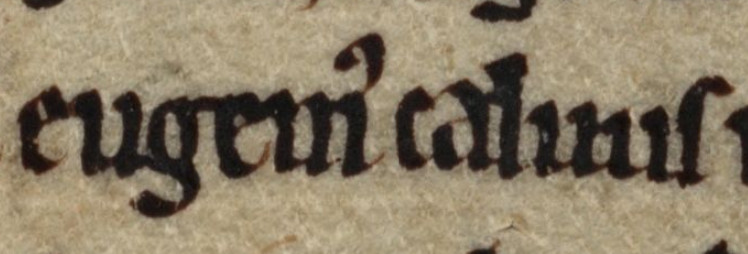
- Owain Foel's name as it appears on folio 94v of Cambridge Corpus Christi College 139 (Historia regum Anglorum).

King of Strathclyde
- Predecessor: Owain ap Dyfnwal
- Issue: possibly Máel Coluim
- Father: possibly Máel Coluim

Owain Foel (fl. 1018), also known as Owain Moel, Owain the Bald, Owen the Bald, and Eugenius Calvus, was an eleventh-century King of Strathclyde. He may have been a son of Máel Coluim, son of Dyfnwal ab Owain, two other rulers of the Kingdom of Strathclyde. Owain Foel is recorded to have supported the Scots at the Battle of Carham in 1018. Although it is possible that he died in the conflict, no source states as much, and it is uncertain when he died. Owain Foel may be an ancestor—perhaps the father—of a certain Máel Coluim who is described as the "son of the king of the Cumbrians" in the 1050s.

== Parentage ==
Simplified pedigree of the Cumbrian royal dynasty. Owain Foel is highlighted. It is possible that all these men ruled the Kingdom of Strathclyde.

Dyfnwal ab Owain (died 975)
Rhydderch (fl. 971)	Máel Coluim (died 997)	Owain (died 1015)
Owain Foel (fl. 1018)
Máel Coluim (fl. 1054)

Owain Foel seems to have been a member of the ruling dynasty of the Kingdom of Strathclyde. For much of the tenth century, the kingdom was ruled by Dyfnwal ab Owain, King of Strathclyde. The chronology of Dyfnwal's apparent abdication is uncertain. He seems to have vacated the throne by the 970s. His apparent son, Rhydderch, may have briefly reigned as king, although no source states as much. Certainly, English sources reveal that Dyfnwal's son, Máel Coluim, ruled in 973 whilst Dyfnwal was still alive. Following Máel Coluim's death in 997, the kingship appears to have passed to a certain Owain ap Dyfnwal, a man who seems to have been yet another son of Dyfnwal.

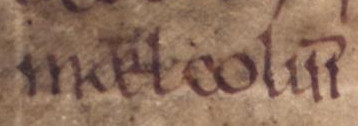
The name of Owain Foel's possible father, Máel Coluim, son of Dyfnwal ab Owain, as it appears on folio 25r of Oxford Bodleian Library Rawlinson B 502 (Saltair na Rann): "Mael Coluim".

According to the "B" version of the eleventh- to thirteenth-century Annales Cambriæ, Owain ap Dyfnwal was slain in 1015. This obituary is corroborated by the thirteenth- and fourteenth-century texts Brut y Tywysogyon and Brenhinedd y Saesson. Although the notices of Owain ap Dyfnwal's demise seem to indicate that he had been killed in battle, nothing is known of the circumstances. Whilst it is possible that these records refer to Owain Foel himself, Owain Foel clearly lived on years afterwards, and there is no reason to disregard the obituaries as erroneous. If the like-named men are indeed different people, they could well have been closely related, with the latter perhaps being a son of Owain ap Dyfnwal's brother, Máel Coluim. The likelihood that there were indeed two contemporary Cumbrian rulers named Owain could account for Owain Foel's epithet (meaning "the bald"). (Note: His name is recorded by the twelfth-century Historia regum Anglorum as Eugenius Calvus.)

== Battle of Carham ==
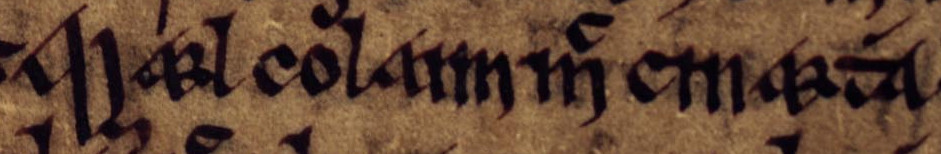
The name of Máel Coluim mac Cináeda as it appears on folio 16v of Oxford Bodleian Library Rawlinson B 488 (the Annals of Tigernach): "Mael Colaim mac Cínaetha".

In 1005, Máel Coluim mac Cináeda succeeded a kinsman as King of Alba. One of this man's earliest royal acts was a strike against his embattled English counterpart, Æthelræd II, King of the English. Unfortunately for the Scots, this invasion of Northumbria was utterly crushed by Uhtred, a young northern magnate who was made Earl of Northumbria as a result of his stalwart defence. In the years that followed, Æthelræd's royal authority collapsed under a sustained Scandinavian onslaught until Knútr Sveinnsson attained the kingship of the entire English realm in 1016.

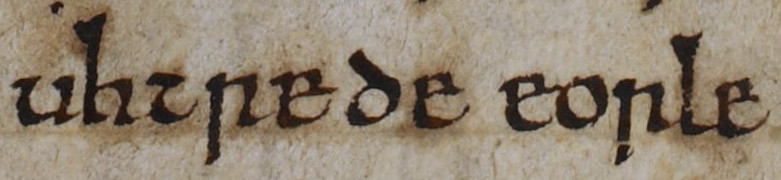
The name and title of Uhtred as it appears on folio 153r of British Library Cotton Tiberius B I (the "C" version of the Anglo-Saxon Chronicle): "Uhtrede eorle".

It may have been the unfolding turmoil in the north of England that lured Máel Coluim mac Cináeda into another cross-border foray. In the course of this invasion, Owain Foel campaigned alongside the Scots, possibly as an ally or vassal of his Scottish counterpart. The operation culminated in the Battle of Carham, a conflict in which the two kings fought and defeated the English at Carham in 1018. Although the battle is recorded by numerous sources, Owain Foel's participation is specifically attested by the twelfth-century Historia regum Anglorum. There is a degree of uncertainty as to the identity of the man who mounted the English defence. According to Historia regum Anglorum, Uhtred commanded the English forces. A passage preserved by the ninth- to twelfth-century Anglo-Saxon Chronicle, however, may indicate that this man had been slain two years beforehand, perhaps revealing that it was actually Uhtred's succeeding brother, Eadwulf Cudel, ruler of Bamburgh, who commanded the English troops.

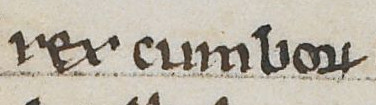
The title of Dyfnwal's son and eventual successor, Máel Coluim, as it appears on folio 9r of British Library Cotton Faustina B IX (the Chronicle of Melrose): "rex Cumbrorum".

The defeat inflicted upon the English seems to have confirmed the Scots' royal authority over Lothian and established the River Tweed as the southern frontier of their realm. For Owain Foel and the Cumbrians, the successful outcome of the campaign would have probably meant a surplus of plunder: including cattle, slaves, and other valuables. It is also possible that the territorial extent of the Cumbrian realm was enlarged by way of the Northumbrian defeat. For instance, a twelfth-century inquest of the landholdings of the Bishop of Glasgow—undertaken at a time when the realm had long since been absorbed by the Scots—appears to identify territories formerly encapsulated within the kingdom. The fact that this inquest included Teviotdale, an important part of what had been Northumbrian territory, could indicate that this region had been annexed by the Cumbrians as a result of the victory at Carham. (Note: In its account of the Battle of Carham, Historia regum Anglorum styles Owain Foel "rex Clutinensium" ("King of the Clydesmen"). The compiler of this source may have intended Clutiensium from *Clutienses. The latter seems to be derived from the Welsh Cludwys, a term that is otherwise employed by the tenth-century Armes Prydein and means "People of the Clyde". The title accorded to Owain Foel differs from those recorded for three of his immediate royal predecessors—his apparent father, grandfather, and great-grandfather—who were styled King of the Cumbrians. Whilst Owain Foel's title may, therefore, be evidence of the diminishment of the realm, the evidence of expansion preserved by the inquest seems to contradict this.)

== Death and Cumbrian contraction ==
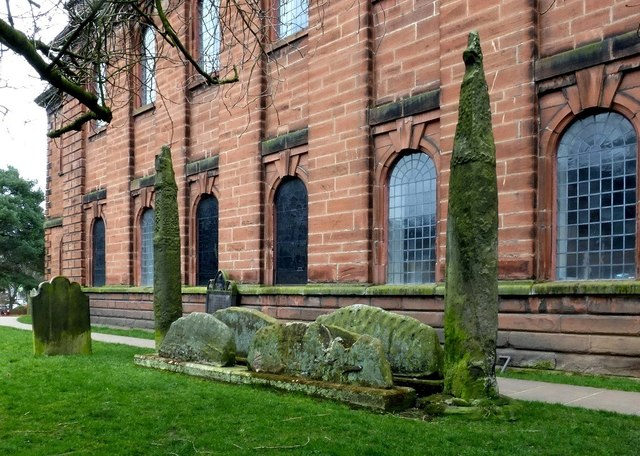
The Giant's Grave, a collection of apparent tenth-century monuments at Penrith. The stones display significant Scandinavian influences, and are traditionally associated with a legendary king, variably known as Owain Caesarius. It is possible that this figure refers to Owain Foel, or any of the tenth- and eleventh-century Cumbrian kings who bore the same name. (Note: Either Owain Foel himself, or his predecessor Owain ap Dyfnwal, or this man's like-named grandfather, Owain ap Dyfnwal, King of Strathclyde, may be identical to Owain Caesarius, a legendary figure associated with an assemblage of apparent tenth-century monuments at Penrith collectively known as The Giant's Grave. The nearby site of Castle Hewin (grid reference NY48544627), a place name meaning "Owain's castle" (derived from castell Ewain), may well be named after the same man. A seventeenth-century account associates Owain Caesarius with the Giant's Caves, located on the north bank of the River Eamont.)

Owain Foel's death date is unknown. Although it is possible that he died at the battle, or else soon after, there is no specific evidence that he was indeed killed or mortally wounded. In fact, he could well have lived and reigned long afterwards. Whatever the case, it may have been upon his death that Máel Coluim mac Cináeda seized control of the kingdom. If the latter had indeed done so in the near aftermath of Carham, such an acquisition would have taken place at the height of his power. There may be reason to suggest that Owain Foel died sometime before 1030, perhaps leaving a weak heir or vacated throne. Certainly, the fourteenth-century Annals of Tigernach records a ravaging inflicted upon Britons that year by the English and the Scandinavians of Dublin.

Another historical episode that may cast light upon the fate of the Cumbrian realm concerns an assembly of northern kings in about 1031. Specifically in about 1031, the Anglo-Saxon Chronicle records a concord between Knútr, Máel Coluim mac Cináeda, Mac Bethad mac Findlaích, and Echmarcach mac Ragnaill. The fact that no Cumbrian king is recorded at this royal assembly seems to reveal that no such king reigned by this date, and may indicate that the Cumbrian realm then formed part of the Scottish Kingdom of Alba. (Note: Against the possibility that Donnchad received the Cumbrian kingship from his grandfather—immediately after the Battle of Carham—is the fact that Donnchad is not attested as one of the kings at the assembly, and the fact that a seemingly contemporary source remarks upon his young age on his death in 1040.) The rationale behind the meeting of the four kings is uncertain. One possibility—amongst many—is that it concerned the collapse of the Kingdom of Strathclyde, and perhaps had something to do with the recorded ravaging of 1030.

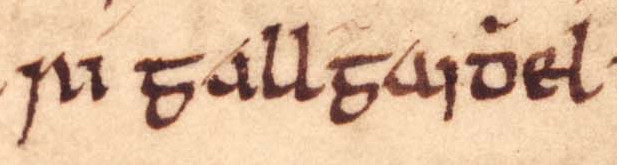
The title of Suibne mac Cináeda as it appears on folio 39r of Oxford Bodleian Library Rawlinson B 489 (the Annals of Ulster).

Another aspect of the uncertainty surrounding the kingdom is the obituary of Suibne mac Cináeda, a man styled King of the Gall Gaidheil. The Gaelic term Gall Gaidheil appears to have been applied to a population of mixed Scandinavian and Gaelic ethnicity, first recorded in the ninth century. Some of the earliest evidence of the Gall Gaidheil seems to indicate that the original territory of this population group was located in the Firth of Clyde region and nearby Cowal. By the twelfth century, the Gall Gaidheil terminology appears to have encompassed the region south and west of Clydesdale and Teviotdale—specifically Ayrshire, Dumfriesshire, Wigtownshire, and Kirkcudbrightshire—and afterwards came to be territorially confined within the boundaries of Galloway. (Note: The Scottish place name Galloway is derived from the Gaelic i nGall Gaidhealaib ("amongst the Gall Gaidheil").) As such, the Gall Gaidheil appear to have expanded deep into what had formerly been Cumbrian-controlled territories. There is reason to suspect that this encroachment was connected to the eleventh-century decline and demise of the Kingdom of Strathclyde. Such an expansion could have taken place with the demise of Owain Foel himself. In fact, Suibne could have been the leader of the Gall Gaidheil who expedited the undoing of the Cumbrian regime, and oversaw the acquisition of much of the kingdom's western territories.

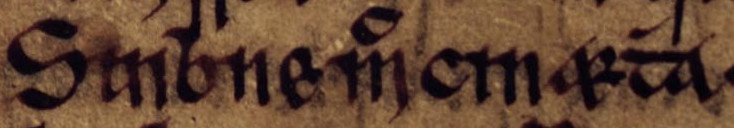
Suibne's name as it appears on folio 16v of Oxford Bodleian Library Rawlinson B 488: "Suibne mac Cinaetha".

The patronym borne by Suibne is the same as that of the reigning Máel Coluim mac Cináeda. This patronym could be evidence that the two were brothers, and that Suibne had instead been placed upon the throne in a region occupied by the Gall Gaidheil. If Suibne and Máel Coluim mac Cináeda were indeed brothers, another possibility is that Suibne's title is evidence that Máel Coluim mac Cináeda seized the vacated Cumbrian kingship and installed Suibne as king over the Cumbrians. Such a move may explain the Scots' failure to immediately exploit their victory over the English in 1018, and could indicate that the Scottish king's resources were instead projected against the vulnerable Cumbrian realm.

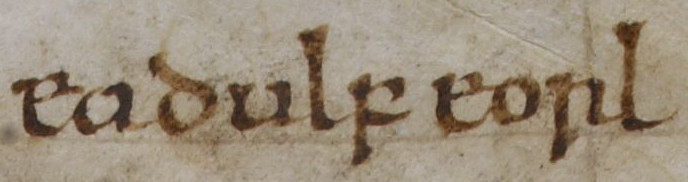
The name and title of Eadwulf (not to be confused with Eadwulf Cudel (Eadwulf III)) as it appears on folio 157r of British Library Cotton Tiberius B I: "Eadulf eorl".

In the words of the pseudo-prophetic twelfth-century Prophecy of Berchán, Máel Coluim mac Cináeda was biodhba Bretan ("enemy of Britons"). Whether this description reflects genuine animosity between him and the Kingdom of Strathclyde is unknown. It is possible that this description of the Scottish king refers to aggression against the Cumbrians at some point after the Battle of Carham and Owain Foel's demise. In 1038, Eadwulf of Bamburgh is stated by Historia regum Anglorum to have attacked certain unspecified Britons. Whilst it is conceivable that this source is evidence that at least some Cumbrians were still independent by this date, another possibility is that these particular people were under Gall Gaidheil overlordship when attacked by the English.

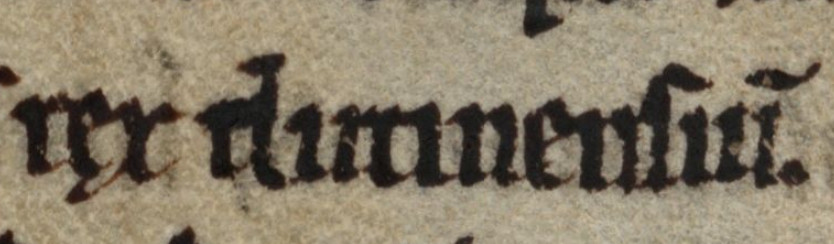
Owain Foel's title as it appears on folio 94v of Cambridge Corpus Christi College 139.

Owain Foel could have lived into the 1050s. In 1054, Siward, Earl of Northumbria invaded Alba and defeated the reigning Mac Bethad. According to the twelfth-century texts Gesta regum Anglorum, and Chronicon ex chronicis, Siward set up a certain Máel Coluim—identified as the son of the king of the Cumbrians—in opposition to Mac Bethad. Máel Coluim appears to have been a member of the Cumbrian royal dynasty, and may well have been a descendant of Owain Foel himself: perhaps a son or grandson. The Gaelic personal name borne by this man could be evidence of an ancestral link with the ruling Scottish Alpínid dynasty: perhaps a matrilineal link to Owain Foel's confederate at Carham, Máel Coluim mac Cináeda. If the Máel Coluim of 1054 was indeed a member of Owain Foel's family, one possibility is that the Scots had deprived him of the Cumbrian kingship following Owain Foel's demise, and that Siward installed him as king over the Cumbrians following the English victory against Mac Bethad. Another possibility, suggested by the account of events dictated by Chronicon ex chronicis, is that Siward installed Máel Coluim as King of Alba. If Máel Coluim was indeed placed upon the Scottish throne, one possibility is that Owain Foel was still reigning as King of Strathclyde. Whatever the case, Owain Foel is the last known king of the realm.

== Citations ==
Owain Foel
Regnal titles
Preceded by Owain ap Dyfnwal	King of Strathclyde	Last known king
