= Owain ap Dyfnwal (fl. 934) =

King of Strathclyde

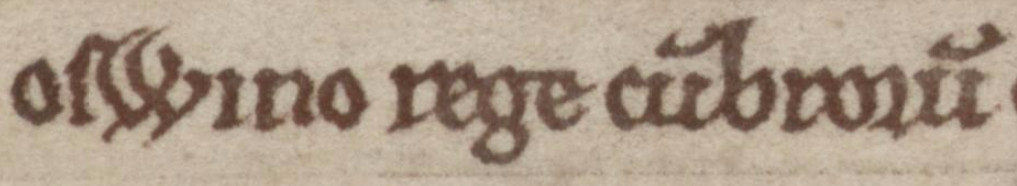
- Owain's name and title as it appears on page 158 of Cambridge University Library Ff.1.27 (Libellus de exordio).

King of Strathclyde
- Predecessor: Dyfnwal
- Successor: Dyfnwal ab Owain
- Issue: Dyfnwal ab Owain
- Father: probably Dyfnwal

Owain ap Dyfnwal (fl. 934) was an early tenth-century King of Strathclyde. (Note: Since the 2000s academics have accorded Owain various patronymic names in English secondary sources: Eogan mac Domnaill, and Owain ap Dyfnwal. Likewise, since the 1990s academics have accorded Owain various personal names in English secondary sources: Eogan, Eugenius, Owain, Owen, and Ywain.) He was probably a son of Dyfnwal, King of Strathclyde, who may have been related to previous rulers of the Kingdom of Strathclyde. Originally centred in the valley of the River Clyde, this realm appears to have undergone considerable southward expansion in the ninth or tenth century, after which it increasingly came to be known as the Kingdom of Cumbria.

Owain may have represented the Cumbrians in the tripartite alliance with the kingdoms of Alba and Mercia, assembled by Æthelflæd, Lady of the Mercians in the 910s. Around this time, the Cumbrians are recorded to have campaigned against either Ragnall ua Ímair or Sitric Cáech. Owain may also be the king of Strathclyde who is recorded to have submitted to Æthelflæd's brother, Edward, King of the Anglo-Saxons, in 920 with Ragnall and Custantín mac Áeda, King of Alba. Moreover, Owain seems to have been present at another assembly in 927, when he, Custantín, Ealdred (son of Eadwulf), and perhaps Owain ap Hywel, King of Gwent, acknowledged overlordship of Edward's son and successor, Æthelstan. This assembly may have been held on or near the River Eamont, seemingly the southern frontier of the Cumbrian kingdom.

Owain is first securely attested in 934, when Æthelstan invaded and ravaged the Scottish Kingdom of Alba and seemingly Strathclyde as well. In the aftermath of this campaign, both Owain and Custantín are known to have been present at Æthelstan's royal court, witnessing several charters as subreguli of the Englishman. Three years later, the Scots and Cumbrians allied themselves with Amlaíb mac Gofraid against the English at the Battle of Brunanburh. It is possible that Owain is identical to the unnamed Cumbrian king recorded to have participated in this defeat by the English. If he was indeed present, he could have been amongst the dead. His son Dyfnwal ab Owain is recorded to have ruled as King of Strathclyde within a few years.

== Background ==
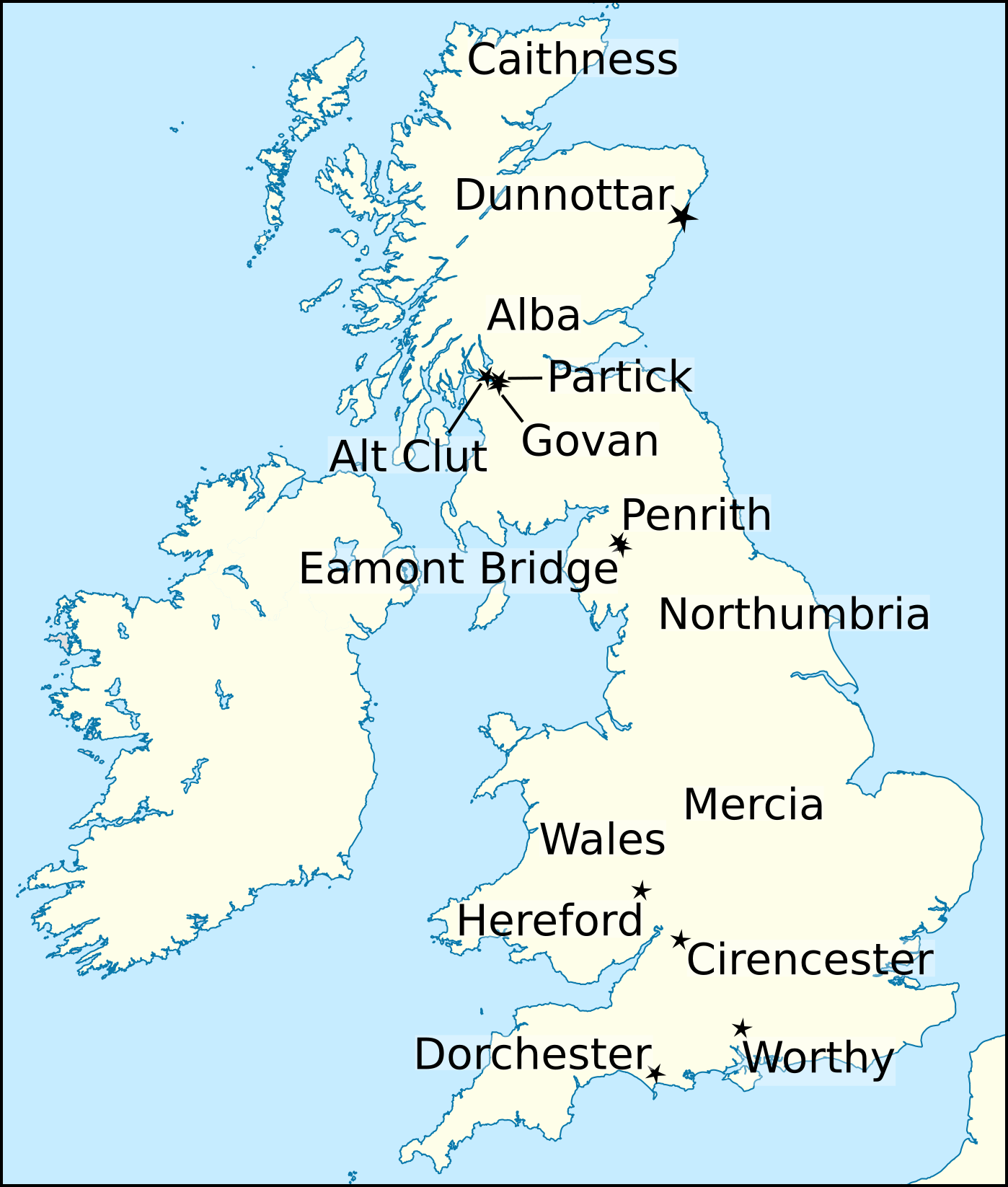
Locations relating to Owain's life and times.

For hundreds of years until the late ninth century, the power centre of the Kingdom of Al Clud was the fortress of Al Clud ("Rock of the Clyde"). In 870, this British stronghold was seized by Irish-based Scandinavians, after which the centre of the realm seems to have relocated further up the River Clyde, and the kingdom itself began to bear the name of the valley of the River Clyde, Ystrad Clud (Strathclyde). The kingdom's new capital may have been situated in the vicinity of Partick and Govan which straddle the River Clyde, and the apparent inclusion in the realm's new hinterland of the valley and the region of modern Renfrewshire may explain this change in terminology.

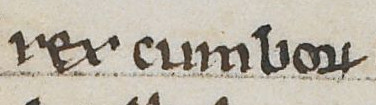
The title of Owain's grandson and eventual successor, Máel Coluim, as it appears on folio 9r of British Library Cotton Faustina B IX (the Chronicle of Melrose): "rex Cumbrorum".

At some point after the loss of Al Clud, the Kingdom of Strathclyde appears to have undergone a period of expansion. Although the precise chronology is uncertain, by 927 the southern frontier appears to have reached the River Eamont, close to Penrith. The catalyst for this southern extension may have been the dramatic decline of the Kingdom of Northumbria at the hands of conquering Scandinavians, and the expansion may have been facilitated by cooperation between the Cumbrians and insular Scandinavians in the late ninth- and early tenth century. Over time, the Kingdom of Strathclyde increasingly came to be known as the Kingdom of Cumbria reflecting its expansion far beyond the Clyde valley. (Note: By about the 920s, the kingdom appears to have comprised much of what is today Lanarkshire, Dunbartonshire, Renfrewshire, Stirlingshire, Peeblesshire, West Lothian, Mid Lothian, eastern Dumfriesshire, and Cumberland. The Old English Cumbras is a form of the Welsh Cymry, a designation likely used by both the northern and the more southerly Britons. Examples of the new terminology for the northern realm include Cumbra land and terra Cumbrorum, meaning "land of the Cumbrians". Such "Cumbrian" nomenclature is found in royal designations, suggesting that its adoption reflected the realm's political expansion. By the mid tenth century, the "Strathclyde" terminology seems to have been mostly superseded. The expansion of the Cumbrian kingdom may be perceptible in some of the place names of southern Scotland and northern England.)

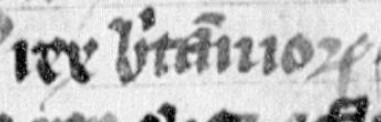
The title of Owain's apparent father, Dyfnwal, as it appears on 29r of Paris Bibliothèque Nationale Latin 4126 (the Poppleton manuscript): "rex Britanniorum".

Owain was likely a son of Dyfnwal, King of Strathclyde. Dyfnwal is specifically attested by only one source, the ninth- to twelfth-century Chronicle of the Kings of Alba, which reveals he died between 908 and 915. (Note: Dyfnwal's name appears in a passage recording the deaths of five kings, after Cormac mac Cuilennáin, King of Munster and before Domnall mac Áeda, King of Ailech.) Dyfnwal's parentage is unknown, although he might have been a member of the British dynasty that ruled Strathclyde before him. He could have been a son or grandson of Eochaid ap Rhun. Alternately, Dyfnwal could have represented a more distant branch of the same dynasty. (Note: The lone surviving pedigree of the dynasty ends with Eochaid's father, Rhun ab Arthgal, King of Strathclyde.) In any case, the names borne by Owain and his apparent descendants suggest that he was indeed a member of the royal kindred of Strathclyde.

== Æthelflæd's tripartite northern alliance ==
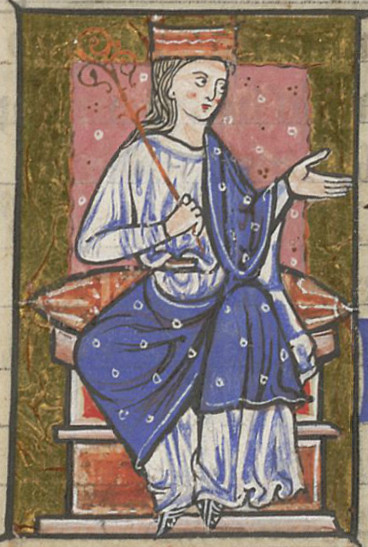
Illuminated portrait of Æthelflæd, from folio 14r of British Library Cotton Claudius B VI.

If the eleventh-century Fragmentary Annals of Ireland is to be believed, at some point between 911 and 918, Æthelflæd, Lady of the Mercians orchestrated an alliance of Mercians, Scots, and Cumbrians, to combat the increasing menace of insular Scandinavians. The compact stipulated that, in the event that one of these three peoples were attacked, the others would come to their aid. The Cumbrians and Scots are further stated to have succeeded in destroying several Scandinavian settlements. (Note: One source that may contradict this annal is the "B" the ninth- to twelfth-century Anglo-Saxon Chronicle (a version also known as the Mercian Register), which reports that Æthelflæd secured an alliance with the men of York in 918.) If this record is indeed accurate, one possibility is that, whilst the Scots focused upon Argyll and the Hebrides, the Cumbrians could have concentrated their efforts against the Scandinavian colonies in the Solway Firth. Although the Fragmentary Annals of Ireland states that a Scandinavian king "sacked Strathclyde and plundered the land", this attack is also said to have been "ineffectual". The unnamed attacking monarch may have been Ragnall ua Ímair, who likely controlled territory in western Northumbria at about this time. Another candidate is Sitriuc Cáech, an Uí Ímair kinsman of Ragnall, who is stated by the same source to have seized the kingship of Dublin before the attack. The leader of the Scots at that time was Custantín mac Áeda, King of Alba. The record of Dyfnwal's death before 915, and the evidence of Owain ruling the Kingdom of Strathclyde in the later decades, suggests that he succeeded Dyfnwal as king, and represented the realm in the alliance. The Cumbrians are not recorded to have received any assistance from Æthelflæd; this could indicate that they were attacked after her death in 918.

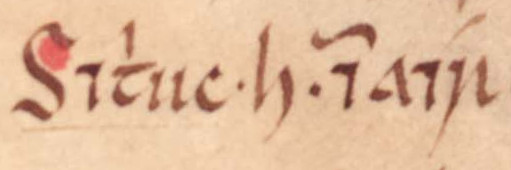
The name of Sitriuc Cáech as it appears on folio 29r of Oxford Bodleian Library Rawlinson B 489 (the Annals of Ulster).

In the year of Æthelflæd's death, Ragnall and the Scots fought the bloody but inconclusive Battle of Corbridge, a clash attested by sources such as the fifteenth- to sixteenth-century Annals of Ulster, the ninth- to twelfth-century Chronicle of the Kings of Alba, and the tenth- or eleventh-century Historia de sancto Cuthberto. The conflict appears to have been associated with Custantín's attempt to reinsert the exiled Northumbrian magnate Ealdred, son of Eadwulf, into western Northumbria. Although the presence of Cumbrians in the campaign is not specifically recorded, it is possible that they too participated in the operations against the insular Scandinavians. In any event, Ragnall's ability to weather the attack seems to have led to his consolidation of authority in western Northumbria.

== Edward's northern assembly of 920 ==
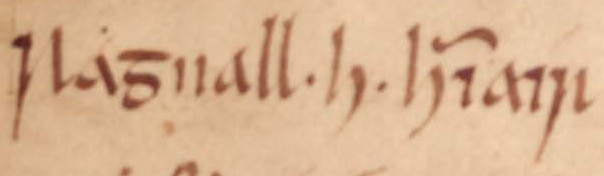
The name of Ragnall ua Ímair as it appears on folio 29r of Oxford Bodleian Library Rawlinson B 489.

In 920, the "A" version of the ninth- to twelfth-century Anglo-Saxon Chronicle alleges that Æthelflæd's brother, Edward, King of the Anglo-Saxons, gained the recognition of overlordship from Custantín (albeit not identified by name), Ragnall, the sons of Eadwulf (seemingly Ealdred and Uhtred), and an unnamed "king of the Strathclyde Welsh" ("Stræcledweala cyning")—a monarch who may well be identical to Owain himself. (Note: This record is the last instance of the term Stræcledwealas to be used by the Anglo-Saxon Chronicle for the population of the Cumbrian realm.) The assembly may have taken place in the Peak District, a region where Edward had recently constructed a burh at Bakewell. In fact, this fortress could well have been the site of the meeting.

Despite the chronicle's claim of Edward's received submission, there is reason to suspect that the event was more a negotiation of sorts—perhaps an agreement concerning the recent reorientation of the political map. For example, Edward had recently gained control of Mercia and parts of Northumbria, while Ragnall acquired York in 919. The twelfth-century Chronicon ex chronicis states that a treaty of peace was concluded between the parties. One possibility is that the Scots and Cumbrians were bound not to attack Ragnall's territories in Northumbria as long as Ragnall refrained from conspiring against Edward's authority. The account of Ragnall's attacks upon the Cumbrians preserved by the Fragmentary Annals of Ireland seems to indicate that he was regarded as a serious threat. The evidence of Cumbrian southward expansion certainly suggests that Owain's realm shared several borders with the insular Scandinavians: an eastern front along the Pennines, a southern front along the River Eamont, and a western front along the coast and perhaps in Galloway. In any event, Ragnall and the sons of Eadwulf are not accorded royal titles in the context of this assembly—as opposed to the Scottish and Cumbrian kings—which could indicate that the Edward was claiming a degree of dominance over Ragnall and the Eadwulfings that he was not claiming over the other monarchs.

== Æthelstan's northern assembly of 927 ==
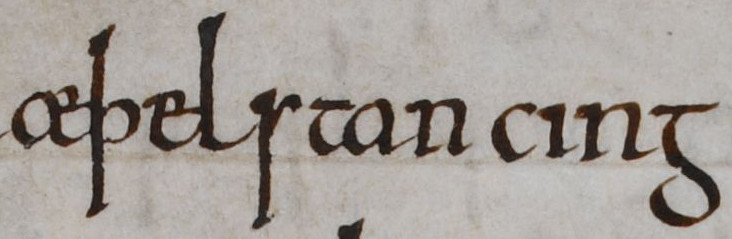
The name and title of Æthelstan as it appears on folio 141r of British Library Cotton Tiberius B I (the "C" version of the Anglo-Saxon Chronicle): "Æþelstan cing".

Owain may also have participated in an assembly of kings with Æthelstan, King of the Anglo-Saxons in 927. According to the "D" version of the Anglo-Saxon Chronicle, the meeting took place at Eamotum, and was attended by Æthelstan, the Welsh king Hywel Dda, Custantín, Owain ap Hywel, King of Gwent, and Ealdred. According to the twelfth-century Gesta regum Anglorum, an assembly took place at Dacre, an ecclesiastical centre near the River Eamont. The list of attendees in this source differs from that of the chronicle in the fact that Owain himself is listed instead of Owain ap Hywel. (Note: Owain is styled rex Cumbrorum ("king of the Cumbrians") by this source.) In fact, the assemblies may well refer to the same event, and it is not unlikely that both Owains were present. (Note: One explanation of this discrepancy is that, although both men were present at the assembly, the chronicle (or its source) conflated the like-named men. For example, the author of the entry in the chronicle—an entry which appears to date to the eleventh century—could have confused Owain with Owain ap Hywel. Another possibility is that both men were associated with the meeting in the sources from which the chronicle and Gesta regum Anglorum are derived. The reason why Owain came to be left out of one source, and Owain ap Hywel out of another, may be because later copyists mistakenly presumed that their sources were in error, and that only one king of the name was present. Yet another explanation is that only Owain was present at the assembly, and that the chronicle has mistaken him for Owain ap Hywel. Certainly, Gesta regum Anglorum records that Æthelstan met with several Welsh kings at Hereford later in 927. As such, there may have been little reason for Owain ap Hywel to attend the northern meeting.) Whatever the case, Owain's involvement may have concerned support rendered to Gofraid ua Ímair, a man who temporarily seized the kingship of York in 927 before being driven out within the year by Æthelstan. Certainly, Gesta regum Anglorum states that Æthelstan summoned the Cumbrian and Scottish kings to the assembly after having forced Gofraid from York into Scotia.

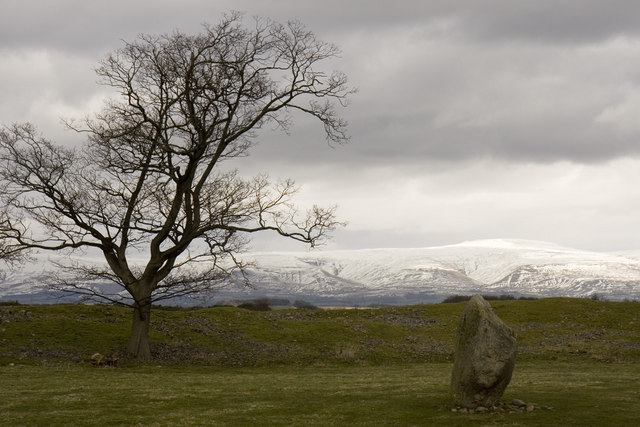
The prehistoric site of Mayburgh Henge, near Eamont Bridge, one of several possible locations of an assemblage of northern kings in 927

The recorded location of the assemblage may be evidence that the Cumbrian realm reached as far south as the River Eamont. Certainly, it is an otherwise well-attested phenomenon of mediaeval European monarchs to negotiate with their neighbours on their common territorial boundaries. In fact, the contemporary Latin poem Carta, dirige gressus seems to not only corroborate the meeting itself, but may further evince the assembly's importance to the Cumbrians. Specifically, the poem states that Custantín hastened to Bryttanium in order to render his submission, and it is possible that this terminology refers to the Cumbrian realm (as opposed to the entire island of Britain). The sources that note the assembly, therefore, may reveal that it took place near the River Eamont at Dacre. Another possibility is that the meeting was set in the vicinity of Eamont Bridge, between the River Eamont and the River Lowther. Not far from this location are two prehistoric henges (Mayburgh Henge and King Arthur's Round Table) and the remains of a Roman fort (Brocavum), any of which could have served as the venue for an important assembly. (Note: Two silver hoards (Penrith Hoard) unearthed in Flusco Pike, near Penrith, date to the 920s/930s. These hoards could have been deposited in connection with the assembly of kings.) Whatever the case, Æthelstan's assembly in the north, and another convened near the Welsh border not long after, marked a turning point in the history of Britain. Not only did Æthelstan claim kingship over all the English peoples of Britain, but positioned himself as overking of Britain itself.

== Æthelstan's invasion of 934 ==
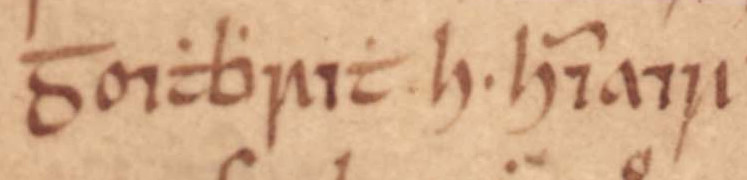
The name of Gofraid ua Ímair as it appears on folio 29v of Oxford Bodleian Library Rawlinson B 489.

In 934, the concordat between Æthelstan and the northern kings collapsed in dramatic fashion, with the former launching an invasion into the north. The Anglo-Saxon Chronicle relates that the English king penetrated into Alba with both land forces and maritime forces, and thereby ravaged much of the realm. Preparations for this massive undertaking appear to be evidenced by several royal charters dating to May and June of that year. The same sources appear to reveal that Æthelstan was supported on his campaign by the Welsh potentates Hywel Dda, Idwal Foel, King of Gwynedd, and Morgan ab Owain, King of Gwent. The fullest account of the English campaign is preserved by the twelfth-century Historia regum Anglorum, a source which states that Æthelstan's land forces marched as far as Dunnottar and Wertermorum, and that his maritime forces reached as far as Catenes (seemingly Caithness). (Note: Other relevant sources include Historia de Sancto Cuthberto, the twelfth- to thirteenth-century Chronicle of Melrose, and the seventeenth-century Annals of Clonmacnoise.) According to the twelfth-century Libellus de exordio, Owain and the Cumbrians were caught up in campaign, with Owain and his Scottish counterpart, Custantín, being put to flight by Æthelstan's forces. The Cumbrian realm, therefore, seems to have endured the same fate as that of the Scots. The reasons behind Æthelstan's campaign are uncertain. One possibility is that Owain and Custantín had broken certain pledges that they had rendered to the English in 927. Perhaps the latter reneged on a promise to render homage. According to Chronicon ex chronicis the King of Alba had indeed broke a treaty with Æthelstan, and that the former was forced to give up a son as an English hostage. Similarly, Gesta regum Anglorum states that Æthelstan invaded Alba because Custantín's realm was "again in revolt". Whether the invasion was unprovoked or orchestrated in revenge, it and another campaign directed against the Cumbrians eleven years later, could well have been utilised by the English Cerdicing dynasty as a way to overawe and intimidate neighbouring potentates.

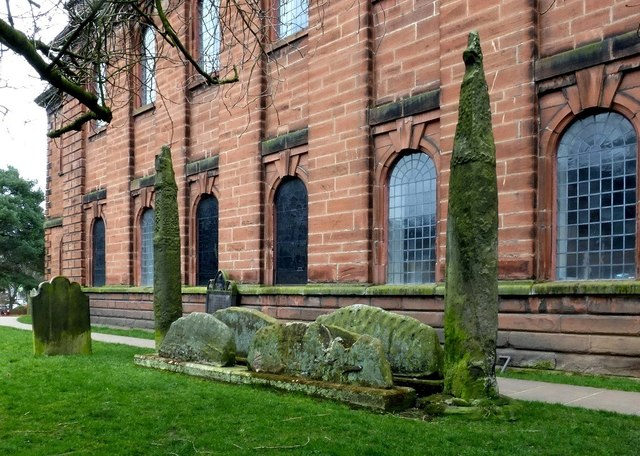
The Giant's Grave, a collection of apparent tenth-century monuments at Penrith. The stones display significant Scandinavian influences, and are traditionally associated with a legendary king, variably known as Owain Caesarius. It is possible that this figure refers to Owain, or any of the tenth and eleventh-century Cumbrian kings who bore the same name. (Note: Either Owain himself, or his like-named grandson Owain ap Dyfnwal, or else their ultimate royal successor Owain Foel, may be identical to Owain Caesarius, a legendary figure associated with an assemblage of apparent tenth-century monuments at Penrith collectively known as The Giant's Grave. The nearby site of Castle Hewin (grid reference NY48544627), a place name meaning "Owain's castle" (derived from castell Ewain), may well be named after the same man. A seventeenth-century account associates Owain Caesarius with the Giant's Caves, located on the north bank of the River Eamont.)

Surviving charter evidence, dating to September 934, reveals that the defeated Custantín submitted to Æthelstan, and was then in the latter's presence witnessing a charter to one of English king's household men. The actual record of this charter is preserved by a fourteenth-century chartulary. Such mediaeval chartularies commonly abbreviated witness lists. Remarkably, no Welsh potentates are recorded by the witness list which could indicate that their names were not preserved by the chartulary. If correct, Owain himself could have been amongst the witnesses as well. In any case, Owain certainly seems to have spent time in Æthelstan's court, attesting several of the latter's royal charters. For example, he appears to have witnessed one as a subregulus in Worthy dated 20 June 931, and one as a subregulus (with Custantín and three Welsh kings) in Cirencester dated 935, and two others as a subregulus (with three Welsh kings) in Dorchester dated 21 December 937. (Note: The Latin term subregulus (plural subreguli) that appears in Æthelstan's charters, can translate to "sub-king", "under-king", "little under-king", and "subordinate ruler". The form of Owain's name in these charters is Eugenius. This name is Latin, and can represent the Gaelic names Éugan, Éogan, and the Old Welsh/Cumbric Eugen, Eugein (the Modern Welsh Owain).) The ordering of the witness lists in Æthelstan's surviving charters seems to reveal the eminent standing Owain enjoyed amongst his royal peers, and suggests that he was regarded as the third most powerful king in Britain, after Custantín and Æthelstan. The fact that Custantín is not known to have attested any English charters before 934 could indicate that his absence from Æthelstan's court was an act of calculated insubordination. As such, the English invasion of 934 could well have been punitive in nature, and its success may be partly exemplified by Custantín's appearance in the witness list of the September 934 charter, in which he is the first recorded subregulus amongst others.

== Defeat at Brunanburh in 937 ==
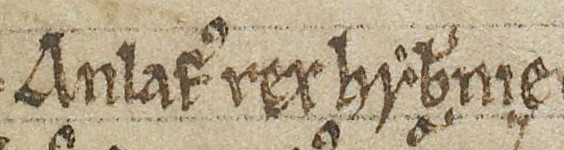
The name of Amlaíb mac Gofraid as it appears on folio 7v of British Library Cotton Faustina B IX: "Anlafus rex Hẏberniæ".

Æthelstan's attempt to incorporate the northern kings into an imperial subreguli system—an arrangement he had earlier initiated with the rulers of Wales—was interrupted before the end of the decade. After 935, none of Æthelstan's subreguli are recorded in the king's presence. It may have been about this period in time when Custantín and Gofraid's son, Amlaíb, concluded the marital alliance referred to by Chronicon ex chronicis. (Note: This dynastic alliance may lay behind a particularly garbled statement preserved by the somewhat fictionalised thirteenth-century Egils saga, which claims that the leader of the Scandinavians at the Battle of Brunanburh, identified by the saga as a Scottish king named Óláfr rauði, was Scottish on his father's side and Danish on his mother's side.) Certainly, Amlaíb consolidated power in Ireland between 934 and 936, before he crossed the Irish Sea and engaged the English at the Battle of Brunanburh in 937. Supporting Amlaíb against Æthelstan—the man who had forced Amlaíb's father from power in Northumbria—were the Scots and Cumbrians. (Note: The twelfth-century Estoire des Engleis states that the insular Scandinavians were supported by Scots, Cumbrians, Gallovidians, and Picts. Egils saga makes note of treacherous Welsh chieftains (Bretar), men who appear to refer to Cumbrians.) Described by the Annals of Ulster as "a great, lamentable and horrible battle", the English victory at Brunanburh was a resounding military achievement for Æthelstan. Regardless of its significance to contemporaries and later generations, however, the precise location of Brunanburh is uncertain.

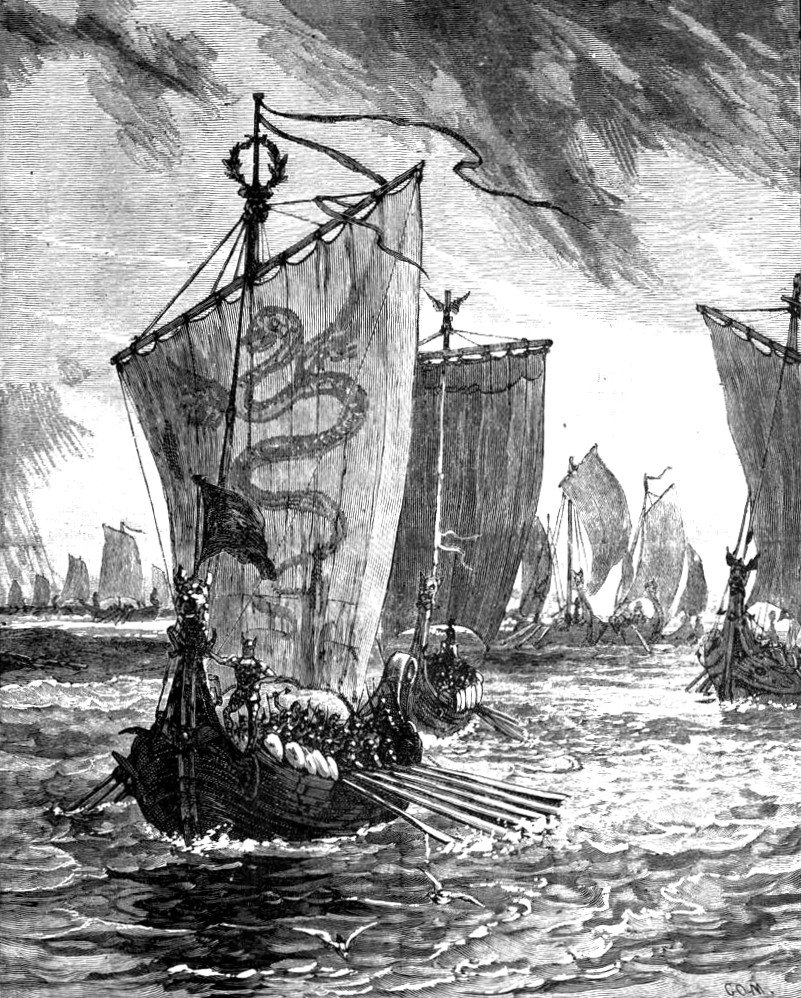
An early twentieth-century depiction of Amlaíb campaigning against the English in 937.

Owain may be identical to the Cumbrian king who is recorded to have participated. The sources that refer to the presence of this monarch—such as Historia regum Anglorum and Libellus de exordio—fail to identify the man by name. The battle is also the subject of the Battle of Brunanburh, a remarkable piece of praise poetry preserved by the Anglo-Saxon Chronicle. This panegyric—one of the most important sources for the conflict—claims that a son of Custantín was killed in the affair, and that five kings also lost their lives against the English. Although the Cumbrians are not specifically mentioned by the text, it is possible that the composer chose to leave them out due to technical constraints regarding the piece's metre and structure. By leaving out the Cumbrians and Owain, the poem presents the opposing sides symmetrically: the West Saxons and Mercians—led by Æthelstan and Edmund I—versus the Scandinavians and Scots—led by Amlaíb and Custantín. Perhaps the Cumbrians' part in the conflict was overshadowed by the combatants; or maybe the poem's composer merely regarded Amlaíb's supporters to be sufficiently represented by the Scots alone. In any event, if Owain was indeed a participant in the conflict, it is possible that he was amongst those who perished.

== Succession ==
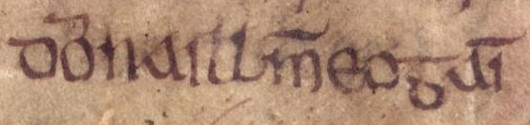
The names of Owain and his son, Dyfnwal, as they appear on folio 25r of Oxford Bodleian Library Rawlinson B 502 (Saltair na Rann): "Domnaill meic Eogain".

It is possible that the scale of the casualties at Brunanburh—which seem to have weakened Æthelstan's forces as well as those of his opponents—could have been seized upon by the Cumbrians to further enable their expansion. Æthelstan's death in 939 would have also provided another window of opportunity to consolidate such territorial gains. In any event, it seems likely that either Owain, or his succeeding son Dyfnwal, submitted to Æthelstan soon after the clash at Brunanburh. The tenth-century Life of St Cathróe appears to reveal that Dyfnwal indeed possessed the kingship not terribly long afterwards. Owain, Dyfnwal, and the latter's son Máel Coluim, are attested by the tenth-century Saltair na Rann in a passage concerning the latter.

== See also ==
- Æthelstan A, an unknown scribe who drafted several royal charters Owain witnessed

== Citations ==
Owain ap Dyfnwal
Regnal titles
Preceded by Dyfnwal	King of Strathclyde; 910s–930s	Succeeded by Dyfnwal ab Owain
