= Rhydderch ap Dyfnwal =

Rhydderch's name as it appears on folio 8v of British Library Cotton Faustina B IX (the Chronicle of Melrose): "Radhardus".

Rhydderch ap Dyfnwal (fl. 971) was an eminent tenth-century Cumbrian who slew Cuilén mac Illuilb, King of Alba in 971. Rhydderch was possibly a son of Dyfnwal ab Owain, King of Strathclyde, and could have ruled as King of Strathclyde. Rhydderch appears on record in about 971, when he is said to have killed Cuilén mac Illuilb, King of Alba, a man said to have abducted and raped Rhydderch's daughter. Following Cuilén's death, the Cumbrian Kingdom of Strathclyde endured an invasion by Cuilén's successor, Cináed mac Maíl Choluim, King of Alba. This Scottish attack could have been a retaliatory raid for Rhydderch's actions, and may have been undertaken in the context of restoring Scottish authority over the Cumbrian realm. If Rhydderch ever ruled as king it must have been before 973, when Dyfnwal's son, Máel Coluim, is accorded the title king.

== Attestation ==
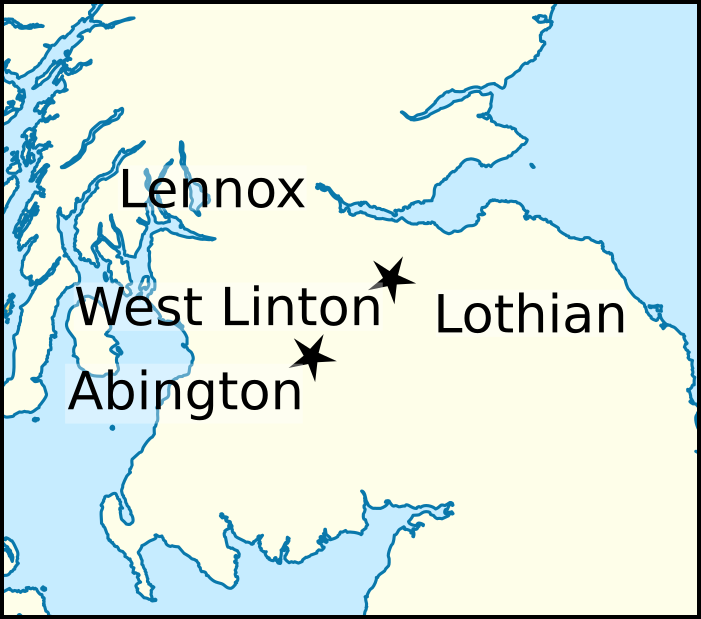
Locations relating to the life and times of Rhydderch.

Rhydderch flourished during the reign of Cuilén mac Illuilb, King of Alba. The latter's undisputed reign as King of Alba seems to have spanned from 966 to 971, and appears to have been relatively uneventful. Cuilén's death in 971 is noted by several sources. According to the ninth- to twelfth-century Chronicle of the Kings of Alba, he and his brother, Eochaid, were killed by Britons. The fifteenth- to sixteenth-century Annals of Ulster also reports that Cuilén fell in battle against Britons, whilst the twelfth-century Chronicon Scotorum specifies that Britons killed him within a burning house. The Chronicle of the Kings of Alba locates Cuilén's fall to "Ybandonia". Although this might refer to Abington in South Lanarkshire, a more likely location may be preserved by the twelfth- to thirteenth-century Chronicle of Melrose. This source states that Cuilén was killed at "Loinas", a placename which seems to refer to either Lothian or the Lennox, both plausible locations for an outbreak of hostilities between Scots and Britons. (Note: In fact, "Ybandonia" itself may well refer to Lothian, or the Lennox.) In any event, the account of Cuilén's demise preserved by the twelfth-century Prophecy of Berchán is somewhat different. According to this source, Cuilén met his end whilst "seeking a foreign land", which could indicate that he was attempting to lift taxes from the Cumbrians. The Chronicle of the Kings of Alba identifies Cuilén's killer as Rhydderch, describing him as the son of a man named Dyfnwal, and further reports that Rhydderch slew Cuilén for the sake of his own daughter. The thirteenth-century Verse Chronicle, the Chronicle of Melrose, and the fourteenth-century Chronica gentis Scotorum likewise identify Cuilén's killer as Rhydderch, the father of an abducted daughter raped by the king.

== Identification and context ==
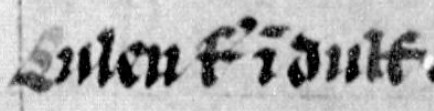
Cuilén's name as it appears on folio 29v of Paris Bibliothèque Nationale Latin 4126 (the Poppleton manuscript): "Culen filius Indulf".

There is reason to suspect that Rhydderch was a son of Dyfnwal ab Owain, King of Strathclyde. Although there is no specific evidence that Rhydderch was himself a king, the fact that Cuilén was involved with his daughter, coupled with the fact that his warband was evidently strong enough to overcome that of Cuilén, suggests that Rhydderch must have been a man of eminent standing. At about the time of Cuilén's demise, a granddaughter of Dyfnwal could well have been in her teens or twenties, and it is possible that the recorded events refer to a visit by the King of Alba to the court of the King of Strathclyde. Such a visit may have taken place in the context of Cuilén exercising his lordship over the Britons. His dramatic death suggests that the Scots severely overstepped the bounds of hospitality, and could indicate that Rhydderch was compelled to fire his own hall. Certainly, such killings are not unknown in Icelandic and Irish sources. The Lothian placename of West Linton appears as Lyntun Ruderic in the twelfth century. The fact that the place name seems to refer to a man named Rhydderch could indicate that this was the place where Cuilén and Eochaid met their end. Another possible scenario concerns the record of Cuilén's father's seizure of Edinburgh preserved by the Chronicle of the Kings of Alba, a conquest which would have included at least part of Lothian. The records that appear to locate Cuilén's fall to Lothian, therefore, could indicate that he was in the midst of exercising overlordship of this debatable land when Rhydderch seized the chance to exact revenge upon the abductor of his daughter.

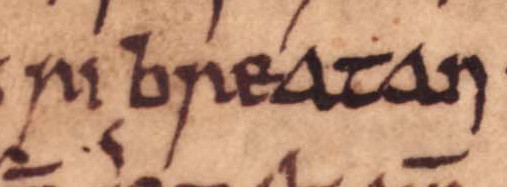
The title of Dyfnwal ab Owain as it appears on folio 33v of Oxford Bodleian Library Rawlinson B 489 (the Annals of Ulster). Irish sources accord him the title rí Bretan ('King of the Britons'). It is unknown if Rhydderch was himself a king. Certainly, the Annals of Ulster accords Dyfnwal's son and successor, Máel Coluim, the title rí Bretan Tuaiscirt ('King of the Northern Britons').

Rhydderch is only attested in sources outlining Cuilén's demise and is not heard of again. Cuilén was succeeded by Cináed mac Maíl Choluim, a fellow member of the Alpínid dynasty. One of Cináed's first acts as King of Alba was evidently an invasion of the Kingdom of Strathclyde. This campaign could well have been a retaliatory response to Cuilén's killing, carried out in the context of crushing a British affront to Scottish authority. Whatever the case, Cináed's invasion ended in defeat, a fact which coupled with Cuilén's killing reveals that the Cumbrian realm was indeed a power to be reckoned with. According to the Chronicle of the Kings of Alba, Cináed constructed some sort of fortification on the River Forth, perhaps at the strategically located Fords of Frew near Stirling. One possibility is that this engineering project was undertaken in the context of limiting Cumbrian incursions.

Whilst it is conceivable that Rhydderch could have succeeded Dyfnwal by the time of Cuilén's fall, another possibility is that Dyfnwal was still the king, and that Cináed's strike into Cumbrian territory was the last conflict of Dyfnwal's reign. In fact, Dyfnwal's son Máel Coluim seems to have taken up the Cumbrian kingship by 973, as evidenced by the latter's act of apparent submission to Edgar, King of the English that year. (Note: The Irish annals record that Dyfnwal died in 975. Another king recorded to have submitted to Edgar in 973 was a certain Dyfnwal. If this man is identical to Dyfnwal himself, it would be evidence that he was still at least associated with the kingship.) This could indicate that, if Rhydderch was indeed a son of Dyfnwal, he was either dead or unable to reign as king by 973. Rhydderch's name appears in many variations in surviving sources. Whilst some of these names appear to be forms of Rhydderch, an established British name, others are apparently forms of Amdarch, an otherwise unknown name that may be the result of textual corruptions.

== Citations ==
Rhydderch ap Dyfnwal Died: 997
Regnal titles
Unknown Last known title holder: Dyfnwal ab Owain	King of Strathclyde^{1}	Unknown Last known title holder: Máel Coluim
Notes and references
1. It is unknown when Dyfnwal ceased to reign as king. Whilst it is possible that Rhydderch succeeded him before 971, it is also possible that he reigned into the 970s to be succeeded by Máel Coluim.
