= Owain ap Dyfnwal (died 1015) =

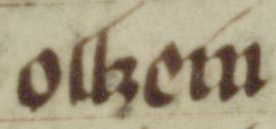
- Owain's name as it appears on folio 60r of Oxford Jesus College 111 (the Red Book of Hergest): "owein".

King of Strathclyde
- Predecessor: Máel Coluim
- Successor: Owain Foel
- Died: 1015
- Father: Dyfnwal ab Owain

Owain ap Dyfnwal (died 1015) may have been an eleventh-century ruler of the Kingdom of Strathclyde. He seems to have been a son of Dyfnwal ab Owain, King of Strathclyde, and may well have succeeded Dyfnwal's son, Máel Coluim, King of Strathclyde. During Owain's reign, he would have faced a massive invasion by Æthelræd II, King of the English. Owain's death is recorded in 1015, and seems to have been succeeded by Owain Foel, a man who may have been his nephew.

== Uncertain succession of Dyfnwal ap Owain ==
Simplified pedigree of the royal Cumbrian dynasty. Owain is highlighted. It is possible that all these men ruled as King of Strathclyde.

Dyfnwal ab Owain (died 975)
Rhydderch (fl. 971) | Máel Coluim (died 997) | Owain (died 1015)
Owain Foel (fl. 1018)

Owain seems to have been a son of Dyfnwal ab Owain, King of Strathclyde. For much of the tenth century—possibly from the 930s to the 970s—the latter ruled the Kingdom of Strathclyde. The chronology of Dyfnwal's apparent abdication is uncertain. He seems to have vacated the throne by the 970s. His apparent son, Rhydderch, may have briefly reigned as king, although no source states as much. Certainly, English sources reveal that Dyfnwal's son, Máel Coluim, ruled in 973 whilst Dyfnwal was still alive. Owain may well have taken up the throne after Máel Coluim's death in 997.

== Invasions of Owain's realm ==
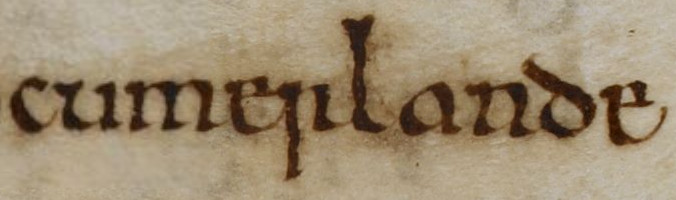
The terminology employed for Owain's realm as it appears on folio 146r of British Library Cotton Tiberius B I (the "C" version of the Anglo-Saxon Chronicle): "Cumerlande".

Surviving sources fail to note the Cumbrian kingdom between the obituaries of Dyfnwal in 975 and his son, Máel Coluim, in 997. Little is certain of Owain's apparent reign. Near the turn of the new millennium, Owain may well have been in his fifties or sixties, and seems to have faced an English invasion of his realm. Specifically, the ninth- to twelfth-century Anglo-Saxon Chronicle reports that Æthelræd II, King of the English unleashed a devastating campaign against the Cumbrian kingdom in 1000. Although the English are said to have ravaged nearly all of the country, the English naval forces based at Chester failed to link up with the land forces —seemingly due to adverse weather conditions —and are recorded to have attacked the Isle of Man instead. On one hand, this island assault could indicate that the English fleet had originally intended to penetrate the Firth of Clyde region before improvising an attack in the Solway Firth. On the other hand, it is possible that the English originally intended to strike out at both the Cumbrians and Islesmen.

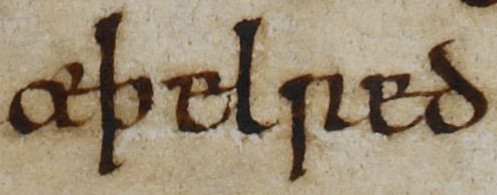
The name of Æthelræd II as it appears on folio 152r of British Library Cotton Tiberius B I: "Æþelred".

The specific reasons behind Æthelræd's attack upon the Cumbrians are uncertain. It may have been meant as a message to his northern subjects and neighbours signifying the strength of English royal authority. One possibility is that Æthelræd's invasion concerned Cumbrian support of Scandinavian predatory forces in the area, and that the operation was aimed at Scandinavian outposts in the Irish Sea region. Certainly, the aforesaid annal-entry also notes that an "enemy fleet" departed for Normandy that year, although no context for this movement is given. According to the twelfth-century Chronicon ex chronicis, the fleet vacated the north prior to Æthelræd's strike, which may well explain why the latter was free to undertake a foreign campaign. In fact, there is reason to suspect that the English had struck a deal with a Scandinavian army seated in England, and thereafter directed one part of this force to engage the Cumbrians and another to attack the Normans.

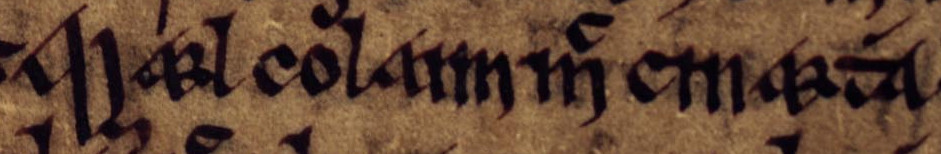
The name of Máel Coluim mac Cináeda as it appears on folio 16v of Oxford Bodleian Library Rawlinson B 488: "Mael Colaim mac Cínaetha".

An Irish contemporary of Owain was Brian Bóruma mac Cennétig, High King of Ireland. In 1006, he mustered a massive force in southern Ireland and marched throughout the north of the island in a remarkable show of force. A passage preserved by the eleventh- or twelfth-century Cogad Gáedel re Gallaib claims that, whilst in the north, Brian's maritime forces levied tribute from Saxons and Britons, and from Argyll, the Lennox, and Alba. This source may be evidence that Brian's Scandinavian forces—perhaps commanded by Sitriuc mac Amlaíb, King of Dublin—campaigned against various Cumbrian-controlled territories, and either the English population of Lothian or the western coast of Northumbria. (Note: Nevertheless, Cogad Gáedel re Gallaib appears to have been compiled for the benefit of Brian's great-grandson, Muirchertach Ua Briain, High King of Ireland, and it is possible that the boastful passage about Brian's overseas authority is reflective of either Muirchertach's own sphere of influence or his sphere of ambition.) Just the year before, Máel Coluim mac Cináeda succeeded a kinsman to become King of Alba. The twelfth-century pseudo-prophetic Prophecy of Berchán describes this monarch as an "enemy of Britons", and within the same passage seems to refer to military actions against the islands of Islay and Arran. This source, therefore, may refer to events related to Brian's apparent overseas operations. It could also be evidence of competition in the region between Brian and his Scottish counterpart.

Also in 1006, the eleventh-century De obsessione Dunelmi records that the Scots penetrated into Northumbria, and besieged Durham before being beaten back by Uhtred, son of the northern English magnate Waltheof. The fact that there is no record of Cumbrian involvement in this Scottish enterprise could indicate that the devastation wrought by the English in 1000 had nullified Cumbrian military might. Another possibility is that the Cumbrians had adhered to the conditions of some sort of submission which Æthelræd had exacted from them as a result of his campaign.

== Death and the Cumbrian succession ==
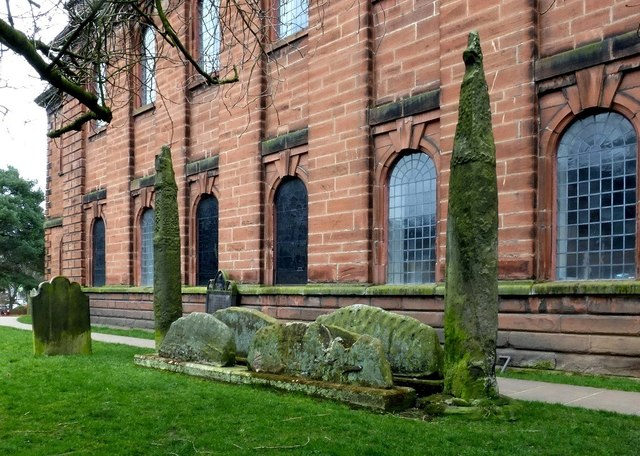
The Giant's Grave, a collection of apparent tenth-century monuments at Penrith. The stones display significant Scandinavian influences, and are traditionally associated with a legendary king, variably known as Owain Caesarius. It is possible that this figure refers to Owain himself, or any of the tenth- and eleventh-century Cumbrian kings who bore the same name.

According to the "B" version of the eleventh- to thirteenth-century Annales Cambriæ, Owain was slain in 1015. This obituary is corroborated by the thirteenth- and fourteenth-century texts Brut y Tywysogyon and Brenhinedd y Saesson. Although the notices of Owain's demise seem to indicate that he was killed in battle, nothing is known of the circumstances. Whilst it is possible that these records refer to the like-named Owain Foel, King of Strathclyde, there is evidence indicating that this man lived on years afterwards, and there is no reason to disregard the aforesaid obituaries as erroneous. If the like-named men are indeed different people, they could well have been closely related, with the latter perhaps being a son of Owain's brother Máel Coluim. The likelihood that there were indeed two contemporary Cumbrian rulers named Owain could account for Owain Foel's epithet (meaning "the bald"). (Note: His name is recorded by the twelfth-century Historia regum Anglorum as Eugenius Calvus.) According to the twelfth-century Historia regum Anglorum, Owain Foel assisted his Scottish counterpart, Máel Coluim mac Cináeda, against the English at the Battle of Carham in 1018.

Either Owain himself, or his like-named grandfather Owain ap Dyfnwal, King of Strathclyde, or else their ultimate royal successor Owain Foel may be identical to Owain Caesarius, a legendary figure associated with an assemblage of apparent tenth-century monuments at Penrith collectively known as The Giant's Grave. The nearby site of Castle Hewin (grid reference NY48544627), a place name meaning "Owain's castle" (derived from castell Ewain), may well be named after the same man. A seventeenth-century account associates Owain Caesarius with the Giant's Caves, located on the north bank of the River Eamont.

Another like-named member of the Cumbrian dynasty may be the Owain ap Dyfnwal who is reported to have been slain in 990 by sources such as the "B" version of Annales Cambriæ, Brut y Tywysogyon, and Brenhinedd y Saesson.

== Citations ==
Owain ap Dyfnwal Died: 1015
Regnal titles
| Preceded by Máel Coluim | King of Strathclyde; 997–1015 | Succeeded by Owain Foel |
