= Saltair na Rann =

The title Saltair na Rann ("Psalter of Quatrains") refers to a series of 150 early Middle Irish religious cantos, written in the tenth century—for the most part apparently around 988. The number of the cantos imitates the number of psalms in the Bible. Together they narrate the sacred history of the world, from its creation down to the last days of humanity. In the principal manuscript, Rawlinson B 502 (Bodleian, Oxford), it is followed by two poems of devotion and ten ‘Songs of the Resurrection’, which were added in the late tenth century.

== Contents ==
- Cantos 1–3 praise God as the creator of the heavens and the earth, paraphrasing the beginning of Genesis, but adding details of angelic hierarchies and other cosmological information.
- Cantos 4–135 paraphrase the Old Testament, focusing on events in Genesis and on King David (who gets 1300 lines); the paraphrase is wrapped up swiftly following the reign of Solomon.
- Cantos 136–37 describe the creatures and plants created by God.
- Cantos 138–41 constitute four prayers, 184 lines in total, invoking God's help.
- Cantos 142–50, 303 lines in total, describe the life of Christ.
- Canto 151 is a poem of repentance.
- Canto 152 is a poem on the nature of Creation.
- Cantos 153–62 describe the signs that will mark the coming of Judgement Day and the Resurrection.

== Authorship ==
In the second devotional poem, Poem 152, the author identifies himself as Óengus Céile Dé: is me Oengus céle Dé (line 8009). Whitley Stokes took this to mean that the work as a whole was ascribed to the famous Óengus mac Óengobann, monk of Tallaght and author of the Félire Óengusso (Martyrology of Óengus), who since the 17th century also happens to have been nicknamed Céile Dé (Culdee). However, since the ascription occurs in appended material and therefore outside the core of Saltair na Rann, it is possible that it refers to the one or two devotional poems, which were either attributed to the earlier Óengus or composed by a late tenth-century namesake.

== See also ==
- Fifteen Signs before Doomsday

== Primary sources ==
- Stokes, Whitley (ed.). Saltair na Rann. A Collection of Early Middle Irish Poems. Oxford, 1883. Available in html markup from CELT and PDF available from Celtic Digital Initiative
- Greene, David and Kelly, Fergus (eds., tr.). The Irish Adam and Eve Story from Saltair na Rann, Vol. 1 Text and Translation; Vol. II Commentary by Brian Murdoch, Dublin Institute for Advanced Studies, 1976.
- Carey, John (tr.). King of Mysteries. Early Irish Religious Writings. 2nd ed. Dublin, 2000. 98-124 (with short introduction at p. 97). Translation of cantos 1–3.

Poem 151, beginning "Isam aithrech (febda fecht)" (c. 987):

- Murphy, Gerard (ed. and tr.). "Prayer for forgiveness." Early Irish Lyrics. Oxford: Clarendon Press, 1956. 36-9 (no. 16). Available from CELT
- Stokes, Whitley (ed.). Saltair na Rann. 114–5.
- Kinsella, Thomas (tr.), "The time is ripe and I repent." In The New Oxford Book of Irish Verse. Oxford, 1986. 54-55 (poem no. 54). Sixth stanza left untranslated.
