= Chronicle of Melrose =

Medieval chronicle

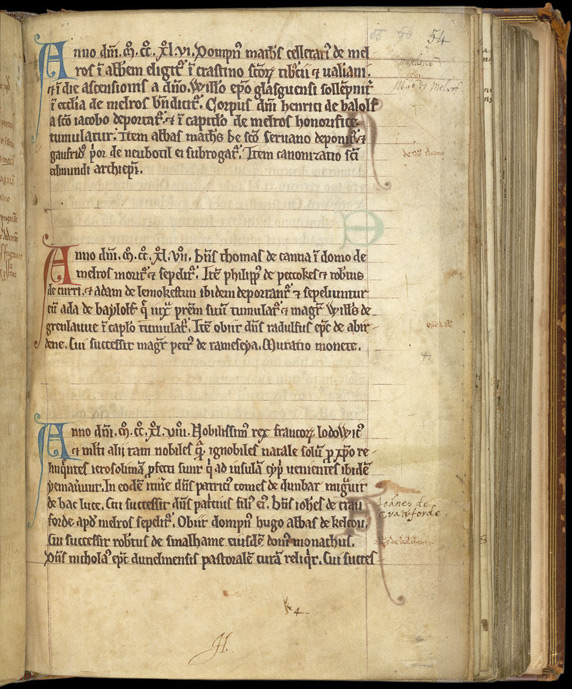
Page from the Chronicle of Melrose in the British Library

The Chronicle of Melrose is a medieval chronicle from the Cottonian Manuscript, Faustina B. ix within the British Museum. It was written by unknown authors, though evidence in the writing shows that it most likely was written by the monks at Melrose Abbey. The chronicle begins on the year 735 and ends in 1270, consisting of two separate segments:

- The first part of the chronicle from the year 745 to about 1140 (the year Melrose Abbey was founded), is a compilation from the Anglo-Saxon Chronicle as well as other historical works written by Simeon of Durham and Hoveden.
- The second portion starts from 1140 until the end of the chronicle in 1270. It contains original work and is considered by historians to be more credible than the first segment.

The chronicle is currently in the British Library, taken away from Melrose possibly during the Reformation period.

In 2014, it was discovered that the Chronicle contains the oldest independent account of the sealing of Magna Carta.

== See also ==
- List of English chronicles
- Cotton library
- Solar eclipse of 1 May 1185
