= Rhun ab Arthgal =

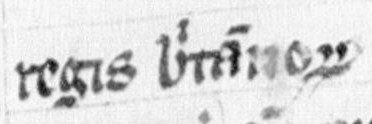
- Rhun's title as it appears on folio 29r of Paris Bibliothèque Nationale Latin 4126 (the Poppleton manuscript): "regis Britannorum" ("king of the Britons").

King of Strathclyde
- Predecessor: Arthgal ap Dyfnwal
- Issue: Eochaid; Dyfnwal?
- Father: Arthgal ap Dyfnwal

Rhun ab Arthgal was a ninth-century King of Strathclyde. (Note: Since the 1990s, academics have accorded Rhun various personal names in English secondary sources: Rhun, and Run. Likewise since the 1990s, academics have accorded Rhun various patronyms in English secondary sources: Rhun ab Arthal, Rhun ab Arthgal, Rhun ap Artgal, Rhun ap Arthgal, Rhun f. Arthgal, Rhun map Artgal, and Rhun map Arthgal. Run map Arthgal is the form of the name recorded in the Harleian Genealogies.) He is the only known son of Arthgal ap Dyfnwal, King of Alt Clut. In 870, during the latter's reign, the fortress of Alt Clut was captured by Vikings, after which Arthgal and his family may have been amongst the mass of prisoners taken back to Ireland. Two years later Arthgal is recorded to have been slain at the behest of Causantín mac Cináeda, King of the Picts. The circumstances surrounding this regicide are unknown. The fact that Rhun seems to have been Causantín's brother-in-law could account for Causantín's interference in the kingship of Alt Clut.

The Viking destruction of the capital fortress of the Kingdom of Alt Clut appears to have brought about a reorientation of the kingdom towards the valley of the River Clyde. In consequence, the realm came to be known as the Kingdom of Strathclyde. Either Rhun or his father could have been the first kings of Strathclyde. In the years following the fall of Alt Clut, Rhun's realm may have endured periods of Pictish and Viking overlordship. Despite his kinship with the Pictish king, there is reason to suspect that the two clashed at some point.

It is unknown when Rhun's reign came to an end or when he died. One possibility is that he fell with Causantín, who seems to have been killed warring against the Vikings in 876. Certainly, Rhun's son, Eochaid, is recorded to have succeeded Causantín's successor, Áed mac Cináeda, King of the Picts, after 878. Whether Eochaid's succession reflects the end of Eochaid's reign and life is unknown.

== Family ==
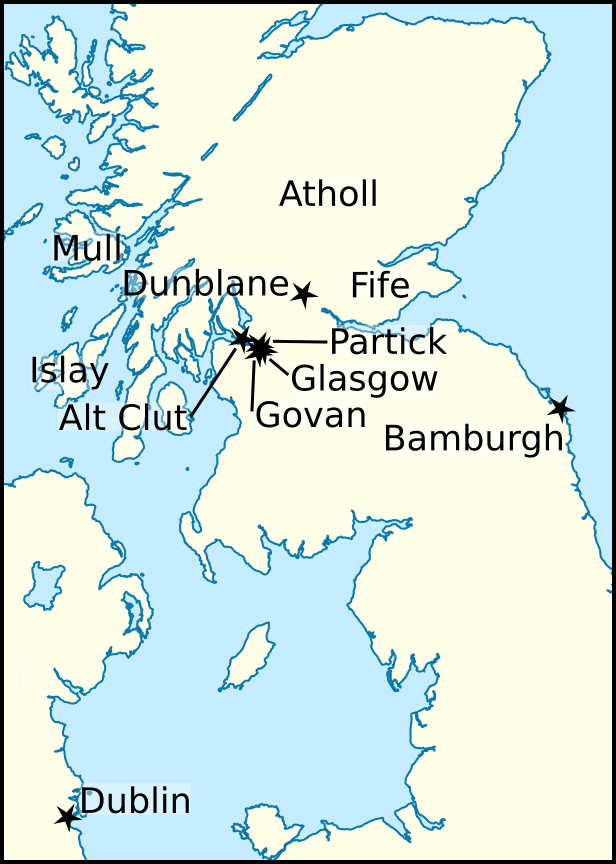
Locations relating to Rhun's life and times.

Rhun's patrilineal ancestry is evidenced by a pedigree preserved within a collection of tenth-century Welsh genealogical material known as the Harleian genealogies. According to this source, Rhun was a son of Arthgal ap Dyfnwal, King of Alt Clut, and descended from a long line of kings of Alt Clut. Rhun is Arthgal's only known son.

In about 849, the ninth- to twelfth-century Chronicle of the Kings of Alba reports that Britons burned Dunblane, an ecclesiastical centre seated on the southern Pictish border. This attack took place during the reign of Cináed mac Ailpín, King of the Picts, and may have been overseen by either Arthgal or his father, Dyfnwal ap Rhydderch. The razing of Dunblane could be evidence that the Kingdom of Alt Clut was in the process of extending its authority at the expense of the Pictish regime. If so, the British kings would appear to have seized upon the chaos wrought by contemporaneous Viking attacks upon the Picts.

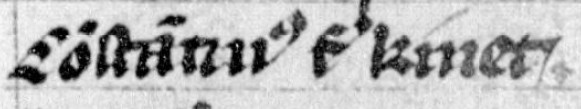
The name of Rhun's brother-in-law, Causantín mac Cináeda, as it appears on folio 29v of Paris Bibliothèque Nationale Latin 4126 (the Poppleton manuscript): "Constantinus filius Kinet".

According to the Chronicle of the Kings of Alba, Rhun was married to a daughter of Cináed. This alliance may have been contracted between the Britons and Picts as a way of repairing international relations following the attack on Dunblane in 849. Rhun is the last listed king in the Harleian pedigree. This could indicate that the genealogy was originally compiled during his floruit—perhaps at the time of his marriage to his Alpínid wife, or upon the outset of his reign as king. According to the Chronicle of the Kings of Alba, a product of the marriage was a son named Eochaid. The twelfth-century Prophecy of Berchán describes Eochaid as "the son of the woman from Dún Guaire". The fact that ninth-century Historia Brittonum identifies Bamburgh as Din Guoaroy could indicate that Dún Guaire too refers to Bamburgh. Another possibility is that Dún Guaire refers to one of two similarly-named sites in the Hebrides (on Mull and Islay), In any event, the association of Rhun's wife with the fort could be evidence that she had been previously married.

== King of Alt Clut ==
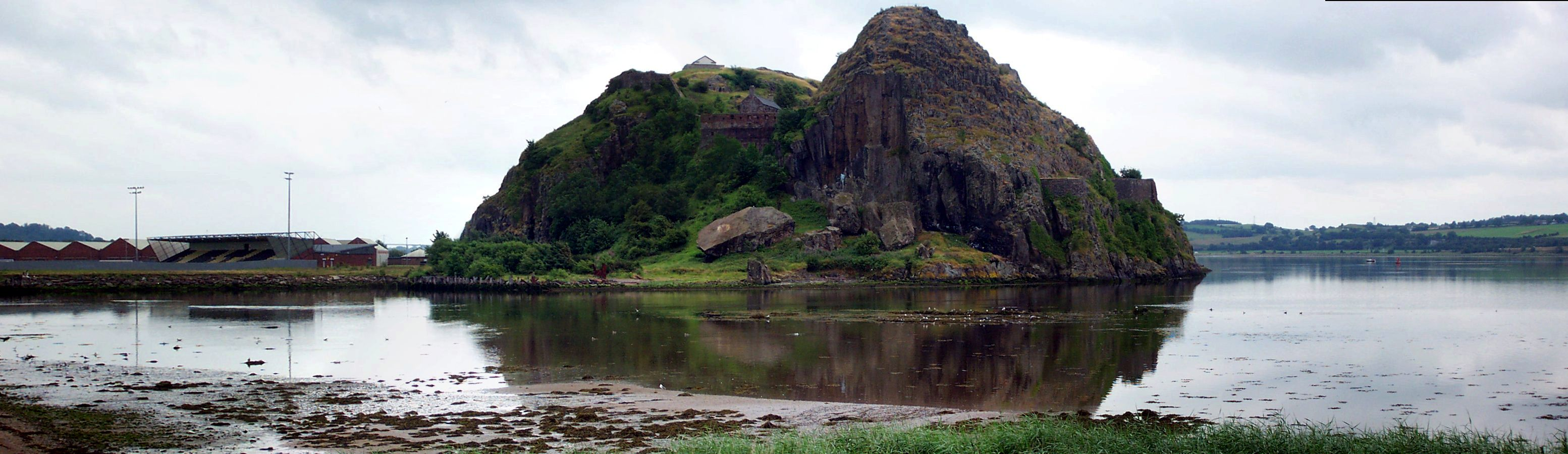
The fortress of Alt Clut occupied Alt Clut ("the rock of the Clyde"). The mediaeval citadel that sat atop this geological formation formed the capital of the Kingdom of Alt Clut until the late ninth century.

In 870, during the reign of Rhun's father, the fortress of Alt Clut was captured and destroyed by the insular Scandinavian kings Amlaíb and Ímar, following a naval blockade of four months. In the following year, the twelfth-century Chronicon Scotorum, the fifteenth- to sixteenth-century Annals of Ulster, and the eleventh-century Fragmentary Annals of Ireland reveal that Amlaíb and Ímar returned to Ireland with a fleet of two hundred ships, and a mass of captives composed of English, Britons, and Picts. (Note: The triumphant return of Amlaíb and Ímar with their prisoners is also reported by the reconstructed Chronicle of Ireland.) The exportation of these people to Ireland is also attested by Annales Xantenses, a ninth-century German source. The captives could have been meant for ransom, or may have been intended for the Dublin slave market. It is possible that Arthgal and his family were amongst those imprisoned.

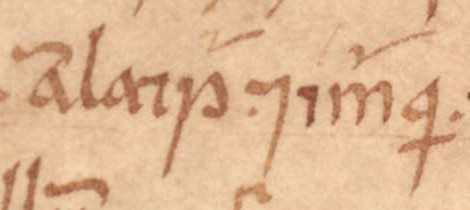
The names of Amlaíb and Ímar, two Irish-based Viking kings, as they appear on folio 25v of Oxford Bodleian Library Rawlinson B 489 (the Annals of Ulster).

Arthgal died in 872. The Annals of Ulster and Chronicon Scotorum reveal that he was slain at the behest of Causantín mac Cináeda, King of the Picts. (Note: Arthgal's death is also reported by the reconstructed Chronicle of Ireland.) If Rhun succeeded Arthgal—as seems likely—it is uncertain how long he outlived him. Although the circumstances surrounding Arthgal's assassination are unknown, the familial relationship between Causantín and Rhun could be evidence that Arthgal's demise was orchestrated to allow Rhun to gain the throne. One possibility is that Rhun had been exiled from his father's realm, and had been living at the Pictish royal court when his father's realm was overcome by Amlaíb and Ímar. This could mean that Causantín acted to offset any rival Rhun had in regard to the British kingship. Conversely, if there was no strife between Rhun and Arthgal, Causantín's actions against the latter may have been carried out in the context of an intrusive and aggressive neighbour. Arthgal's elimination may have been carried out in the context of an attempt by Causantín to capitalise upon the political turmoil wrought by the Viking onslaught.

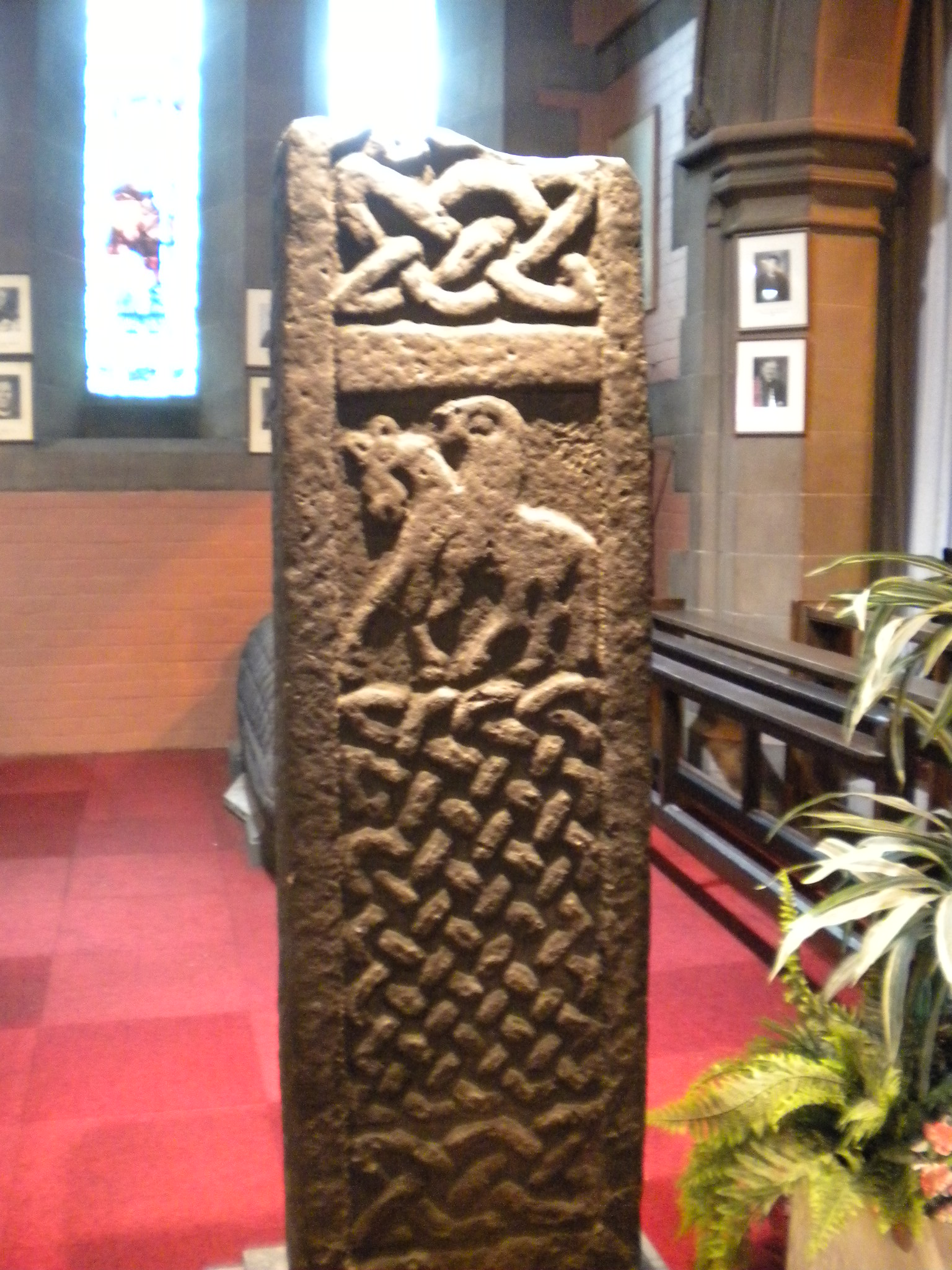
The early mediaeval Jordanhill Cross, an example of the so-called 'Govan School' of sculpture that incorporates Celtic and Scandinavian artistry. Several dozen stone monuments make up this collection, perhaps the most significant assemblage of Viking Age sculpture in Britain.

Another possibility is that, following the conquest of Alt Clut, Arthgal ruled as a puppet king under Amlaíb and Ímar. Certainly, the Vikings utilised royal puppets in the conquered kingdoms of Northumbria and East Anglia. If so, it could explain Causantín's role in Arthgal's demise, and could explain why his brother-in-law (or future brother-in-law) eventually succeeded to the throne. In any event, Arthgal's elimination at Causantín's instigation would appear to have rid the latter of a neighbouring adversary, and would have also increased his own authority and reputation.

Although the Harleian pedigree identifies the listed rulers as those of the Kingdom of Alt Clut, it is apparent that one aftereffect of the destruction of the eponymous fortress was that the capital of the realm shifted up the River Clyde to the vicinity of Govan and Partick. (Note: Alt Clut had evidently been the principal stronghold of the Strathclyde Britons since the fifth century.) Whilst Govan—seated on the Southern bank of the River Clyde—appears to have been utilised by Arthgal and Rhun's eighth-century predecessors, (Note: Govan appears to be noted by the twelfth-century Historia regum Anglorum in the account of Eadberht and Onuist, the respective Northumbrian and Pictish monarchs, imposing terms of peace upon the Britons at "Ovania".) Partick—situated on the Northern bank—could well have been used at least a century earlier.

The relocation is partly exemplified by a shift in royal terminology. Until the fall of Alt Clut, for example, the rulers of the realm were styled after the fortress; whereas following the loss of this site, the Kingdom of Alt Clut came to be known as the Kingdom of Strathclyde in consequence of its reorientation towards Ystrat Clut (Strathclyde), the valley of the River Clyde. Arthgal himself is styled King of the Strathclyde Britons upon his death in 872—the first use of this terminology by Irish sources. Although it is possible that Arthgal ultimately met his end in Ireland at the hands of his Viking captors, this title could instead be evidence that he had briefly ruled the new Kingdom of Strathclyde. Either he or Rhun could have been the first monarch to rule this reconstructed realm.

== King of Strathclyde ==
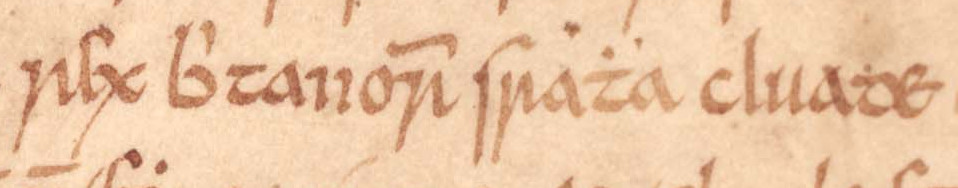
The title of Rhun's father, Arthgal ap Dyfnwal, as it appears on folio 25v of Oxford Bodleian Library Rawlinson B 489 (the Annals of Ulster).

Rhun's reign probably commenced not long after his father's death, in 872. The Chronicle of the Kings of Alba identifies Rhun as rex Britannorum ("king of the Britons"). Hostility between Rhun and his brother-in-law may be evidenced by the Prophecy of Berchán. According to this source, Causantín won four victories over his enemies. Whilst the first three victories are stated to have been won against Vikings, the fourth is described as that of Cath Lures—a location possibly identical to Glasgow—where he overcame the "king of the Britons of the green mantles". Although it is possible that the unnamed king in question was Arthgal—which could in turn cast light upon this man's demise—another possibility is that the prophecy refers to Rhun himself. If Rhun is indeed the prophecy's mantled monarch, his conflict with Causantín may have occurred in the aftermath of his father's demise, and may have been undertaken in an attempt to ensure his kingdom's independence from Pictish overlordship.

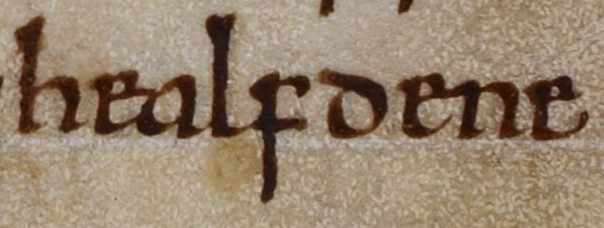
The name of Hálfdan as it appears on folio 131v of British Library Cotton Tiberius B I (the "C" version of the Anglo-Saxon Chronicle): "Healfdene".

If a garbled passage preserved by the Chronicle of the Kings of Alba is to be believed, Amlaíb was killed by Causantín in 872/874/875, whilst in the midst of extracting tribute from the Picts. Upon Ímar's death in 873, the Annals of Ulster styles him "king of the Northmen of all Ireland and Britain", a title that may partly exemplify Viking overlordship of regions inhabited by the Picts, Strathclyde Britons, and the Welsh. In 875, seemingly during Rhun's reign, the Chronicle of the Kings of Alba reports that the Picts suffered a devastating loss to insular Scandinavians at Dollar after which the invaders are said to have occupied the vicinity for one year. This Viking conquest—seemingly corroborated by the Annals of Ulster—may be related to the campaigns of Hálfdan against the Picts and Strathclyde Britons in 875/876, as recorded by the ninth- to twelfth-century Anglo-Saxon Chronicle. This northern campaigning by Hálfdan could have been conducted in the context of the insular Scandinavians not only avenging Amlaíb's killing but of regaining Ímar's authority in the region. At any rate, these clashes with the Britons seem to show that the Kingdom of Strathclyde was not permanently subjected. (Note: The report of warfare given by the Anglo-Saxon Chronicle contains the first record of "the Britons of Strathclyde" (*Strætcledwalas) in English sources. The Talnotrie hoard, one of the few definable ninth-century hoards uncovered in Britain, may have been associated with the campaigning of Ímar or Hálfdan against the northern Britons.)

== Death and succession ==
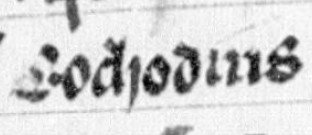
The name of Rhuns's son, Eochaid, as it appears on folio 29r of Paris Bibliothèque Nationale Latin 4126: "Echodíus".

It is uncertain when Rhun's reign and life ended. One possibility is that Rhun died in 876, when Causantín seems to have been slain by Vikings. Causantín's death is dated to 876 by the Annals of Ulster. The Chronicle of the Kings of Alba appears to locate his fall in Atholl, whilst several king-lists locate his demise to a place variously called Inverdufat, an otherwise uncertain location that could refer to Inverdovat in Fife. (Note: The Prophecy of Berchán also associates Causantín's death with a place name that may refer to Inverdovat.) If Causantín indeed enjoyed overlordship of Strathclyde at this date, Rhun could have fallen alongside him as a supporting vassal. It is likewise unknown who succeeded to the kingship of Strathclyde. If Rhun and Causantín both died in 876, Eochaid could well have inherited the British kingship in their absence. Certainly, Causantín's brother, Áed mac Cináeda, succeeded as King of the Picts, and ruled as such upon his death two years later. Whilst it is possible that the Pictish kingship was then assumed by a certain Giric, another possibility is that Eochaid succeeded to the throne.

If the Prophecy of Berchán is to be believed, Eochaid ruled as king until he was expelled and replaced by Giric. The Chronicle of the Kings of Alba, however, states that Eochaid and Giric shared the kingship between themselves, and that Giric was the alumnus ("foster-father" or "foster-son") and ordinator ("governor" or "king-maker") of the former, before both men were expelled from office. One possibility is that Giric indeed succeeded Áed, and that Eochaid succeeded Rhun. Another possibility is that Giric and Eochaid jointly succeeded Áed, with Giric holding a more senior position (as the Chronicle of the Kings of Alba appears to evince). Whilst Eochaid's maternal Alpínid ancestry could well have ensured him a claim to the Pictish throne, the ancestry of Giric is uncertain. (Note: Eochaid's maternal ancestry may be exemplified by the name he bore. There is no known British form of the Gaelic Eochaid. In theory, a Pictish form of the name would be *Ebid or *Ebdei.) Another son of Rhun could have been Dyfnwal, who ruled the Kingdom of Strathclyde into the second decade of the tenth century.

== Ancestry ==
Ancestors of Rhun ab Arthgal

16. Owain ap Dyfnwal
8. Rhydderch ab Owain
4. Dyfnwal ap Rhydderch
2. Arthgal ap Dyfnwal (died 872)
1. Rhun ab Arthgal

== Citations ==
Rhun ab Arthgal
Regnal titles
Preceded by Arthgal ap Dyfnwal as King of Alt Clut	King of Strathclyde; 872×	Unknown Next known title holder: Dyfnwal^{1}
Notes and references
1. It is possible that Rhun's son, Eochaid, succeeded Rhun as king.
