= 752 =

Calendar year

752 in various calendars
Gregorian calendar	752; DCCLII
Ab urbe condita	1505
Armenian calendar	201; ԹՎ ՄԱ
Assyrian calendar	5502
Balinese saka calendar	673–674
Bengali calendar	158–159
Berber calendar	1702
Buddhist calendar	1296
Burmese calendar	114
Byzantine calendar	6260–6261
Chinese calendar	辛卯年 (Metal Rabbit); 3449 or 3242 — to — 壬辰年 (Water Dragon); 3450 or 3243
Coptic calendar	468–469
Discordian calendar	1918
Ethiopian calendar	744–745
Hebrew calendar	4512–4513
- Hindu calendars
Vikram Samvat	808–809
Shaka Samvat	673–674
Kali Yuga	3852–3853
Holocene calendar	10752
Iranian calendar	130–131
Islamic calendar	134–135
Japanese calendar	Tenpyō-shōhō 4 (天平勝宝４年)
Javanese calendar	646–647
Julian calendar	752; DCCLII
Korean calendar	3085
Minguo calendar	1160 before ROC 民前1160年
Nanakshahi calendar	−716
Seleucid era	1063/1064 AG
Thai solar calendar	1294–1295
Tibetan calendar	ལྕགས་མོ་ཡོས་ལོ་ (female Iron-Hare); 878 or 497 or −275 — to — ཆུ་ཕོ་འབྲུག་ལོ་ (male Water-Dragon); 879 or 498 or −274

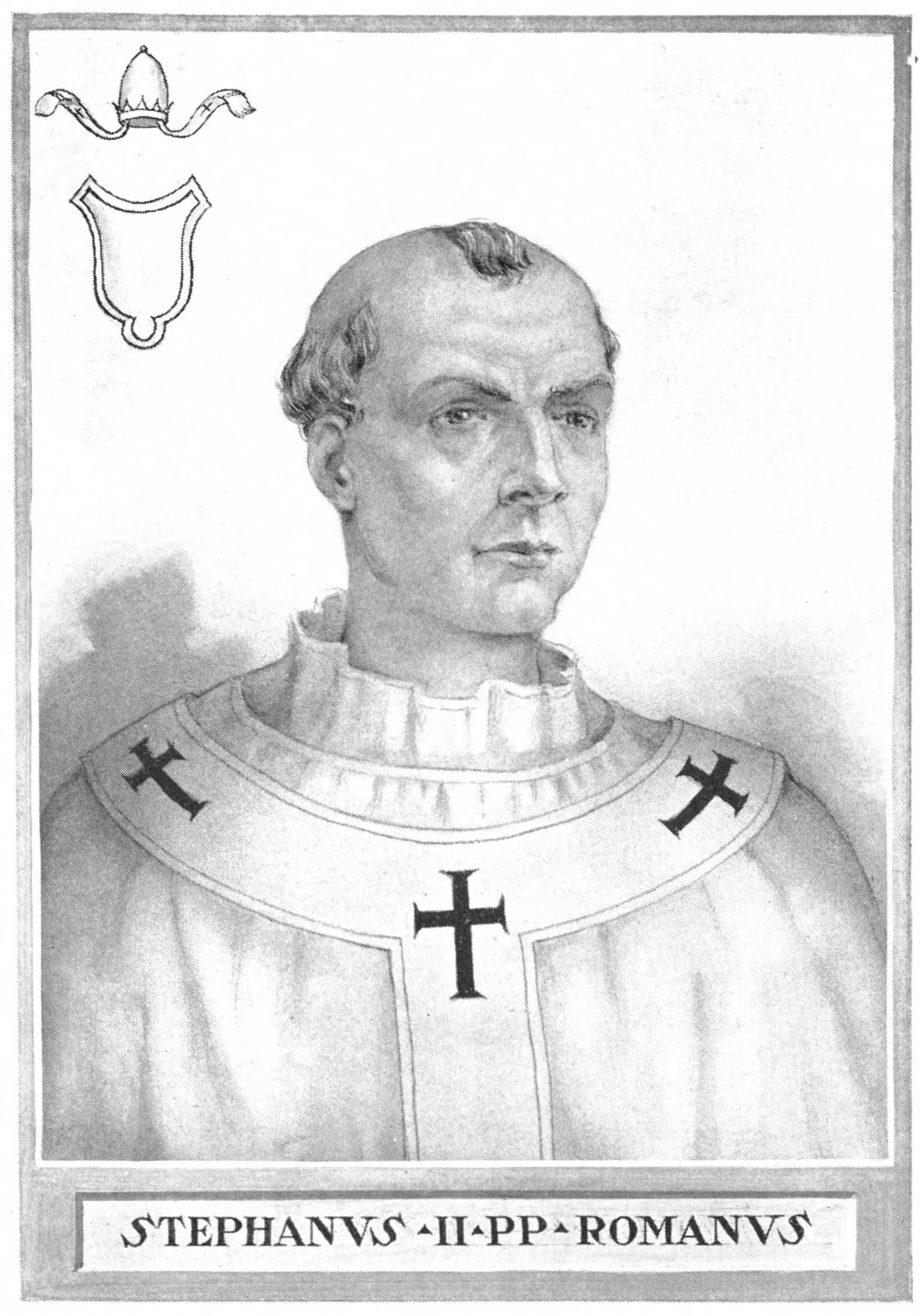
Pope-elect Stephen

Year 752 (DCCLII) was a leap year starting on Saturday of the Julian calendar, the 752nd year of Common Era (CE) and Anno Domini (AD) designations, the 752nd year of the 1st millennium, the 52nd year of 8th century, and the 3rd year of the 750s decade. The denomination 752 for this year has been used since the early medieval period, when the Anno Domini calendar era became the prevalent method in Europe for naming years.

== Events ==
=== By place ===
==== Europe ====
- King Pepin III ("the Short") begins a Frankish military expedition down the Rhône Valley, and receives the submission of eastern Septimania (i.e. Nîmes, Melguelh, Agde and Béziers), after securing Count Ansemund's allegiance.
- Siege of Narbonne: Pepin III lays siege to the fortress city of Narbonne, occupied by Gothic-Muslim forces. The garrison and residents are able to withstand the attacks, thanks to the supplies provided by sea by the Arab fleet.

==== Britain ====
- Battle of Burford: King Cuthred of Wessex clashes with King Æthelbald of Mercia, and takes the standard (a golden dragon). He manages to throw off his claim to Mercian overlordship.
- King Teudebur of Alt Clut dies. His son, Dumnagual III, succeeds to the throne and loses Kyle to a joint invasion, by kings Óengus I of the Picts and Eadberht of Northumbria. ^{(Most records show Dumnagual III succeeds Rotri in 754 AD. Erroneous statement suspected)}

==== Africa ====
- Abd al-Rahman ibn Habib al-Fihri, ruler of Ifriqiya (North Africa), dispatches a Muslim army and reconquers Tripolitania from the Ibadites (a puritanical Khaijite sect), driving their remnants south into the Nafusa Mountains (northwestern Libya).
- Abd al-Rahman ibn Habib al-Fihri launches an assault on the island of Sardinia, perhaps the beginning of the occupation of the island by the Muslim Arabs that lasts until 1005. He also attempts to invade Sicily, but finds the defenses too strong.

==== Mesoamerica ====
- Yaxun B'alam IV becomes king (ajaw) of the Maya city of Yaxchilan (modern Mexico), after a 10-year struggle for the throne.

=== By topic ===
==== Religion ====
- March 22 – Pope Zachary dies at Rome after an 11-year reign. He is succeeded by Stephen, but he dies four days after, and is not considered legitimate because he was not consecrated.
- March 26 – Pope Stephen II (sometimes referred to as Stephen III) succeeds Zachary as the 92nd pope of the Catholic Church. He marks the end of the Byzantine Papacy.
- June – Stephen II recognizes the Carolingian dynasty as legitimate rulers of the Frankish Kingdom. He travels to Paris and appeals for Frankish support against the Lombards.
- Emperor Shōmu (retired since 749) takes part in the dedication ceremony of the Great Buddha, (15 metres) at Tōdai-ji in Nara (Japan), and declares himself a Buddhist.

== Births ==
- Al-Mada'ini, Muslim scholar and historian (d. 843)
- Irene of Athens, Byzantine empress (approximate date)
- Joannicius the Great, Byzantine theologian (d. 846)
- Zheng Yin, chancellor of the Tang dynasty (d. 829)

== Deaths ==
- March 15 – Zachary, pope of the Catholic Church
- March 26 – Stephen, pope of the Catholic Church
- Lupus, duke of Spoleto (Italy)
- Teudebur, king of Alt Clut (Scotland)
