= Dumnagual =

Dumnagual was the name of several kings of Alt Clut, later known as Strathclyde:

- Dumnagual I of Alt Clut (c. 6th century)
- Dumnagual II of Alt Clut (7th century)
- Dumnagual III of Alt Clut (mid-8th century)
- Dumnagual IV of Alt Clut (9th century)

== See also ==
- Dyfnwal (disambiguation)
