= Arthgal ap Dyfnwal =

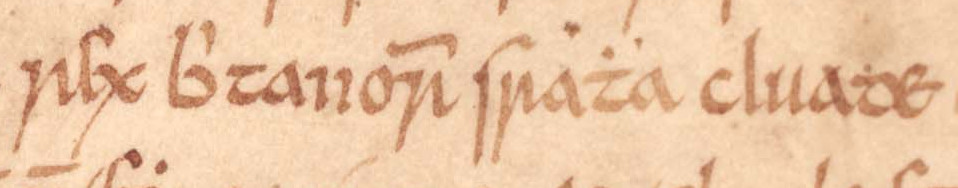
- Arthgal's title as it appears on folio 25v of Oxford Bodleian Library Rawlinson B 489 (the Annals of Ulster).

King of Alt Clut
- Reign: ×872
- Predecessor: Dyfnwal ap Rhydderch
- Successor: Rhun ab Arthgal
- Died: 872
- Father: Dyfnwal ap Rhydderch

Arthgal ap Dyfnwal (died 872) was a ninth-century king of Alt Clut. (Note: Since the 1990s, academics have accorded Arthgal various names in English secondary sources: Artgal, Arthal, and Arthgal. Since the 1990s, academics have accorded Arthgal various patronyms in English secondary sources: Arthal ap Dyfnwal, Arthgal ap Dyfnwal, Arthgal map Dumnagual, and Arthgal map Dyfnwal. Arthgal's name—Artgal (Old Irish), Arthgal (Old Welsh), Arthal (Middle Welsh)—is possibly derived from the Old Celtic *Artogalno-, a personal name meaning "having the vigour of a bear", "vigorous like a bear". As such, Artgal can be taken to mean "one who is fierce or valorous as a bear".) He descended from a long line of rulers of the British Kingdom of Alt Clut. Either he or his father, Dyfnwal ap Rhydderch, King of Alt Clut, may have reigned when the Britons are recorded to have burned the Pictish ecclesiastical site of Dunblane in 849.

In 870, the seat of Arthgal's realm—the island fortress of Alt Clut—was besieged by the Viking kings Amlaíb and Ímar. After four months, the fortress fell to the Vikings, who are recorded to have transported a vast prey of British, Pictish, and English captives back to Ireland. The fall of Alt Clut marked a watershed in the history of Arthgal's realm. Afterwards, the capital of the kingdom appears to have relocated up the River Clyde to the vicinity of Govan and Partick, and became known as the Kingdom of Strathclyde.

Two years after the fall of Alt Clut, Arthgal is recorded to have been assassinated at the behest of Causantín mac Cináeda, King of the Picts. The circumstances surrounding Arthgal's death are uncertain. Whilst it is possible he was captured by the Vikings in 870 and slain whilst still in captivity, it is also possible that he was reigning as king when he died. The fact that Arthgal's succeeding son, Rhun, was Causantín's brother-in-law could be evidence that Arthgal was killed to make way for Rhun. Another possibility is that, following the destruction of Alt Clut, Arthgal ruled as a puppet king under the Vikings. If so, this could also account for Causantín's actions. On the other hand, Causantín may have merely acted out of sheer opportunism, and Rhun may have succeeded to the throne without his assistance. In any event, either Arthgal or Rhun could have been the first kings to rule as King of Strathclyde.

== Family ==
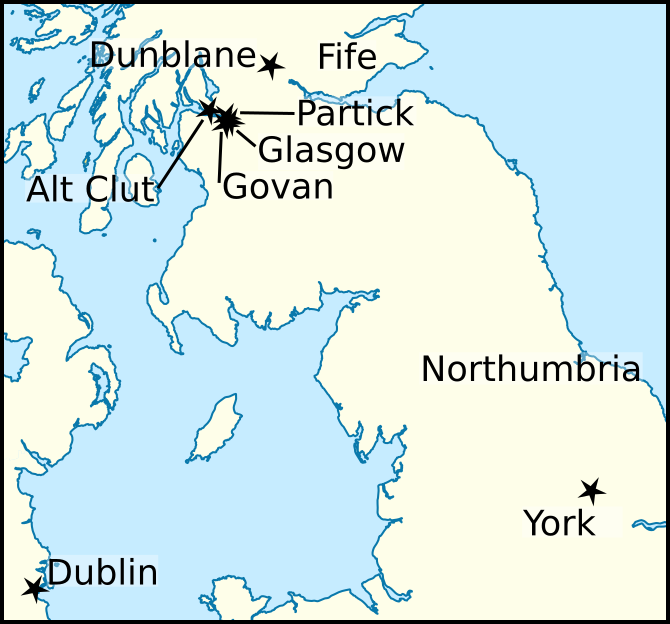
Locations relating to Arthgal's life and times.

According to a pedigree preserved within a collection of tenth-century Welsh genealogical material known as the Harleian genealogies, Arthgal descended from a long line of kings of Alt Clut. The genealogy specifies that Arthgal was the son of Dyfnwal ap Rhydderch, King of Alt Clut, an otherwise unknown ruler.

In about 849, the ninth- to twelfth-century Chronicle of the Kings of Alba reports that Britons burned Dunblane, a Pictish ecclesiastical centre seated on the southern Pictish border. This attack took place during the reign of Cináed mac Ailpín, King of the Picts, and may have been overseen by either Arthgal or Dyfnwal. This notice of penetration into Pictish territory is the first record of British activity since the midpoint of the eighth century. (Note: Alt Clut was earlier attacked by a combined force of Picts and Northumbrians in about 756, and when Arthgal's predecessor, Dyfnwal ap Tewdwr, King of Alt Clut, died in 760.) The razing of Dunblane could be evidence that the British Kingdom of Alt Clut was in the process of extending its authority at the expense of the Pictish regime. If so, the kings of Alt Clut would appear to have seized upon the chaos wrought by contemporaneous Viking attacks upon the Picts.

== King of Alt Clut ==
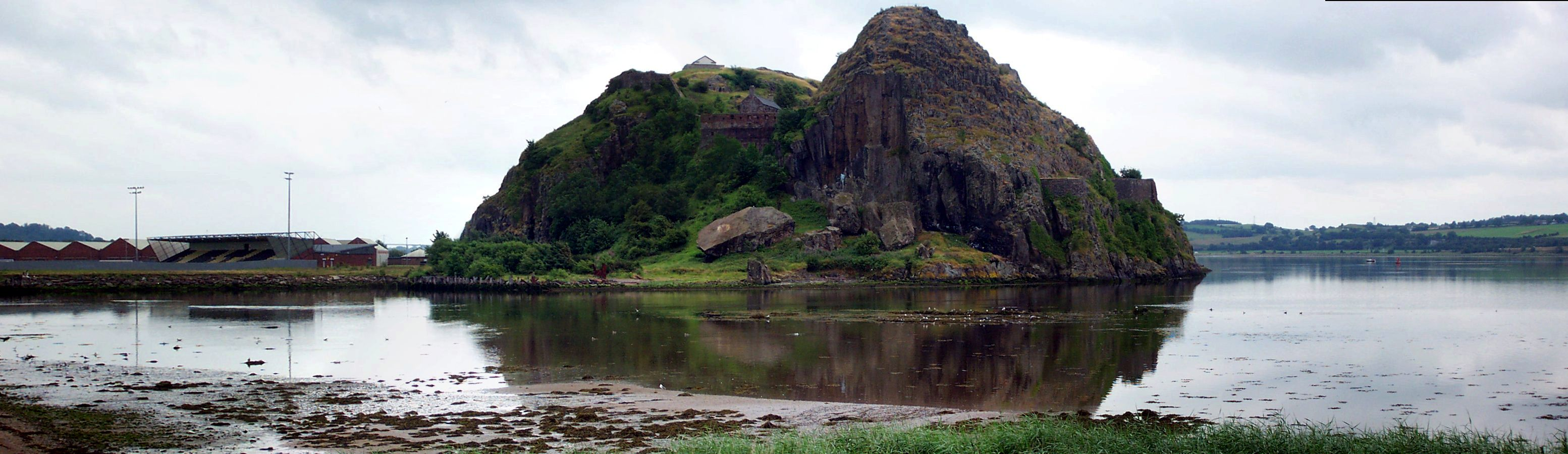
The fortress of Alt Clut occupied Alt Clut ("the rock of the Clyde"). The mediaeval citadel that sat atop this geological formation formed the capital of the Kingdom of Alt Clut before it was captured and destroyed by Amlaíb and Ímar.

In 870, the fifteenth- to sixteenth-century Annals of Ulster, and the eleventh-century Fragmentary Annals of Ireland reveal that the insular Scandinavian kings Amlaíb and Ímar laid siege to Alt Clut, and succeeded in capturing the fortress after a blockade of four months. (Note: The attack is also reported by the reconstructed Chronicle of Ireland. The attack is the first notice of the fortress since the report by the Annals of Ulster that Alt Clut was burned on 1 January 780.) The destruction of Alt Clut is also documented by Welsh sources such as the eleventh- to thirteenth-century Annales Cambriæ, and the thirteenth- and fourteenth-century texts Brenhinedd y Saesson and Brut y Tywysogyon. The fact that such far-off sources make note of the event may exemplify the alarm caused by the Vikings' successes throughout Britain. According to Fragmentary Annals of Ireland, Alt Clut only fell to attacks after the well went dry. One possibility is that the Vikings had successfully secured control of the well that saddles Dumbarton Rock, thereby denying the Britons access to fresh water. (Note: The fall of Alt Clut may have been the subject of a particular prímscél ("chief tale")—Argain Sratha Cluada—that is mentioned by the thirteenth-century Book of Leinster.)

The following year, the twelfth-century Chronicon Scotorum, the Annals of Ulster, and the Fragmentary Annals of Ireland reveal that Amlaíb and Ímar returned to Ireland with a fleet of two hundred ships, and a mass of captives identified as English, British, and Pictish. (Note: The triumphant return of Amlaíb and Ímar with their prisoners is also reported by the reconstructed Chronicle of Ireland.) The exportation of these people to Ireland is also attested by Annales Xantenses, a ninth-century German source. The captives could have been meant for ransom, or may have been intended for the Dublin slave market. It is possible that Arthgal and his family were amongst those imprisoned.

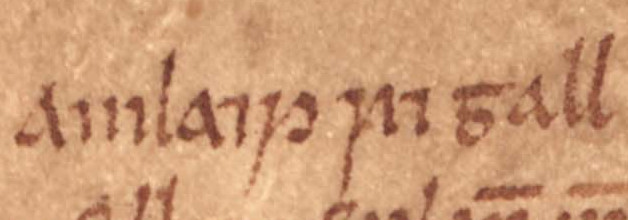
The name and title of Arthgal's adversary Amlaíb as it appears on folio 25r Oxford Bodleian Library Rawlinson B 489. The Viking kings of Dublin were accorded the Gaelic title rí Gall ("king of the Foreigners").

The reasons behind the attack are uncertain. On one hand, it is possible that Alt Clut was targeted because it was regarded as a rich target. On the other hand, the remarkable duration of the siege could indicate that, instead of merely plundering Arthgal's realm, Amlaíb and Ímar specifically sought and succeeded in capturing the capital. (Note: Alt Clut had evidently been the principal stronghold of the Strathclyde Britons since the fifth century.) It could be that Amlaíb and Ímar regarded the kings of Alt Clut as an active threat to their maritime interests, and that the fortress of Alt Clut served the Britons much like how longphuirt were utilised as naval bases by the Vikings in Ireland. The destruction of the citadel may have allowed the Vikings to gain unrestricted access into central Scotland. On one hand, the recorded ethnicity of the Vikings' captives could reveal that the Britons of Alt Clut possessed many English and Pictish slaves or subjects. On the other hand, the recorded ethnicities may be evidence that Alt Clut's fall was the only recorded incident in what may have been a series of coeval Viking campaigns in the region, and may indicate that Amlaíb and Ímar not only established overlordship over the Strathclyde British, but that they also asserted power over the English of Lothian and throughout the Pictish realm. (Note: Another possibility is that the notice of English captives refers to prisoners seized in Anglo-Saxon England by the Great Army. Whilst there is reason to suspect that Ímar is identical to Ingware, an apparent leader of the Great Army, such an identification is nevertheless uncertain.) Although it is possible that the Scandinavians sought a connecting route between Dublin and York, the fact that there are no waterways or suitable portages that bridge the Firth of Clyde and the Firth of Forth may well be evidence against this. The fact that the Fragmentary Annals of Ireland seems to show that Amlaíb promptly returned to Britain in about 872 could be evidence that the assault on Alt Clut was undertaken in the context of territorial conquest/control rather than the mere acquisition of portable wealth. (Note: The Fragmentary Annals of Ireland specifically states that Amlaíb travelled to Lochlainn. Although this term (and variants of this term) certainly refers to Norway by the eleventh century, there is reason to suspect that, in this instance, it refers to a Scandinavian-dominated part of Scotland.)

== Death and succession ==
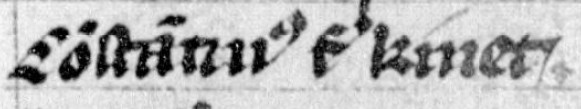
The name of Causantín mac Cináeda, the brother-in-law of Arthgal's son, and the man who instigated Arthgal's death, as it appears on folio 29v of Paris Bibliothèque Nationale Latin 4126 (the Poppleton manuscript): "Constantinus filius Kinet".

Arthgal died in 872. The Annals of Ulster and Chronicon Scotorum reveal that he was slain at the behest of Causantín mac Cináeda, King of the Picts. (Note: Arthgal's death is also reported by the reconstructed Chronicle of Ireland. His recorded fate echoes that of Cathalán mac Indrechtaig, a contemporaneous King of the Ulaid who appears to have been killed at instigation of Áed Findliath, a claimant to the Irish high-kingship.) Rhun, Arthgal's only known son, is the last king to be listed in the Harleian pedigree that pertains to Arthgal.

If Rhun succeeded Arthgal—as seems likely—it is uncertain how long he outlived him. Despite Causantín's part in Arthgal's demise, Rhun is otherwise known to have married a sister of Causantín at some point. (Note: This marital alliance may have been contracted in the context of repairing relations between the Britons of Alt Clut and the Picts following the attack on Dunblane in 849.) Although the circumstances surrounding Arthgal's assassination are unknown, the familial relationship between Causantín and Rhun could be evidence that Arthgal's demise was orchestrated to allow Rhun gain the throne. One possibility is that Rhun had been exiled from his father's realm, and had been living at the Pictish royal court when Amlaíb and Ímar commenced their campaign. This could mean that Causantín acted to offset any rival Rhun had in regard to the British kingship. Conversely, if there was no strife between Rhun and Arthgal, Causantín's actions against the latter could have been carried out in the context of an intrusive and aggressive neighbour.

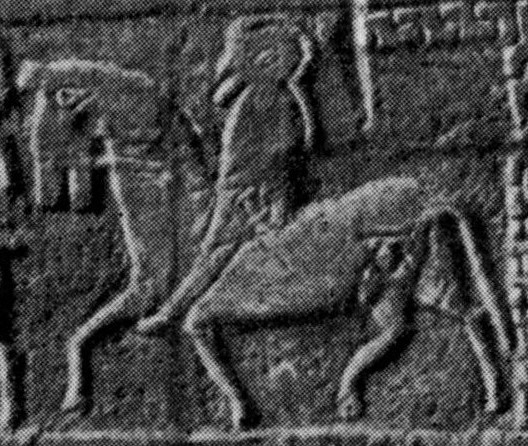
A mounted warrior displayed upon the Govan sarcophagus. This monument is perhaps the finest example of the so-called 'Govan School' of sculpture. The sarcophagus could to be that of Arthgal's adversary, Causantín.

Arthgal's elimination may have been carried out in the context of an attempt by Causantín to capitalise upon the political turmoil wrought by the Viking onslaught. The destruction of Alt Clut marks the last time the fortress appears on record until the thirteenth century. (Note: Over time, the fortress came to be known in Gaelic as *Dún Bretan (Scottish Gaelic Dùn Breatann), meaning "the fort of the Britons".) Although the site could have served as a Viking military base following the British defeat, there is no archaeological evidence evincing its use as a seat of lordship until later centuries. Perhaps the site was discredited, and came to be regarded as unsuitable to the ruling dynasty thereafter. Certainly, the British capital appears to have shifted up the River Clyde to the vicinity of Govan and Partick. Whilst the former site—on the north bank of the River Clyde—appears to have been utilised by Arthgal's eighth-century predecessors, the latter site—on the south bank—could well have been used at least a century earlier.

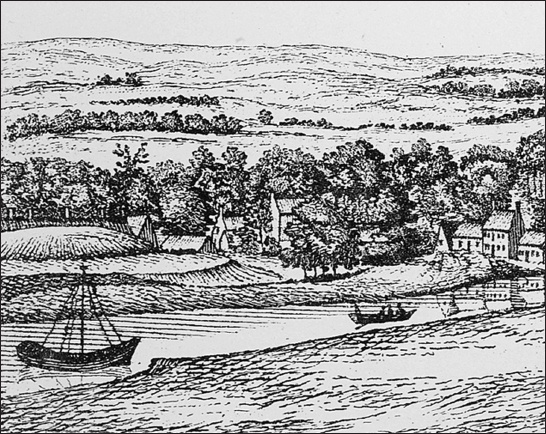
An eighteenth-century engraving of the southern bank of the River Clyde at Govan. The scene shows a now-nonexistent artificial hill that could to have been the royal assembly site of the Kingdom of Strathclyde following the fall of Alt Clut. (Note: This site—identified in local tradition as "Doomster Hill"—was destroyed in the nineteenth century. The stepped sides of the hill are similar to those of some Scandinavian assembly sites in Britain and Ireland.)

This relocation of the capital seems to be borne out by surviving documentary sources. Until the fall of Alt Clut, for example, the rulers of the realm were styled after the fortress. After the loss of this site, the Kingdom of Alt Clut came to be known as the Kingdom of Strathclyde in consequence of its reorientation towards Ystrat Clut (Strathclyde), the valley of the River Clyde. Arthgal himself is styled King of the Strathclyde Britons upon his death in 872—the first use of this terminology by Irish sources. Whilst it is possible that Arthgal met his end in Ireland at the hands of his Viking captors, the title accorded to him on his death could be evidence that he had instead been ruling the new Kingdom of Strathclyde. In fact, it is possible that he or Rhun was the first monarch to rule this realm.

There is also reason to suspect that Arthgal's death occurred in the context of conflict with the Picts. For example, the twelfth-century Prophecy of Berchán attributes four victories to Causantín, with the fourth described as that of Cath Lures—a location possibly identical to Glasgow—where he overcame the "king of the Britons of the green mantles". This source, coupled with Arthgal's obituaries, could indicate that Causantín had Arthgal executed or assassinated after defeating him in battle. Such an event may account for the specific records of Causantín's role in Arthgal's demise. Another possibility is that, following the conquest of Alt Clut, Arthgal ruled as a puppet king under Amlaíb and Ímar. Certainly, the Vikings utilised royal puppets in the conquered English kingdoms of Northumbria and East Anglia. A similar relationship between Arthgal and Viking power could explain Causantín's role in Arthgal's demise, and could explain how Rhun succeeded to the throne. There is also reason to suspect that, as a result of Rhun's assumption of power, Causantín gained overlordship over the kingdom. In any event, Arthgal's apparent elimination at Causantín's instigation would appear to have rid the Picts of a neighbouring adversary, and would have served to increase Causantín's authority and reputation.

== Ancestry ==
Ancestors of Arthgal ap Dyfnwal

16. Dyfnwal ap Tewdwr (died 760)
8. Owain ap Dyfnwal
4. Rhydderch ab Owain
2. Dyfnwal ap Rhydderch
1. Arthgal ap Dyfnwal (died 872)

== Citations ==
Arthgal ap Dyfnwal Died: 872
Regnal titles
Preceded by Dyfnwal ap Rhydderch	King of Alt Clut ×872	Succeeded by Rhun ab Arthgal as King of Strathclyde
