= Erbin =

Erbin may refer to:

== People ==
- Erbin of Alt Clut, 5th-century Scottish king
- Erbin of Dumnonia (c. 427–c. 480), Cornish king and saint
- Erbín Trejo (born 1990), Mexican footballer

== Other uses ==
- Erbin (protein)
- Harbin, the capital of Heilongjiang, China, also known as "Erbin" (Chinese: 尔滨)
