= Dyfnwal =

Dyfnwal may refer to:

- Dyfnwal Hen (fl. 6th century), King of Alt Clut
- Dyfnwal, King of Strathclyde (died 908–915)
- Dyfnwal ab Owain (died 975), King of Strathclyde

== See also ==
- Dumnagual (disambiguation)
