= Siege of Dumbarton =

870 siege of Dumbarton by Vikings

- Part of the Viking invasions of Scotland
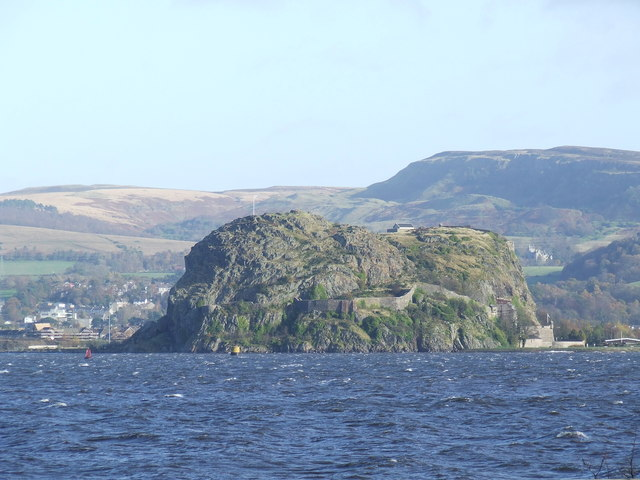
- View of Dumbarton Rock from across the River Clyde
Date	870
Location	Dumbarton Rock 55.9360°N 4.5628°W
Result	Dublin victory

Belligerents
Kingdom of Strathclyde	Kingdom of Dublin

Commanders and leaders
Arthgal ap Dyfnwal	Ivar the Boneless; Olaf
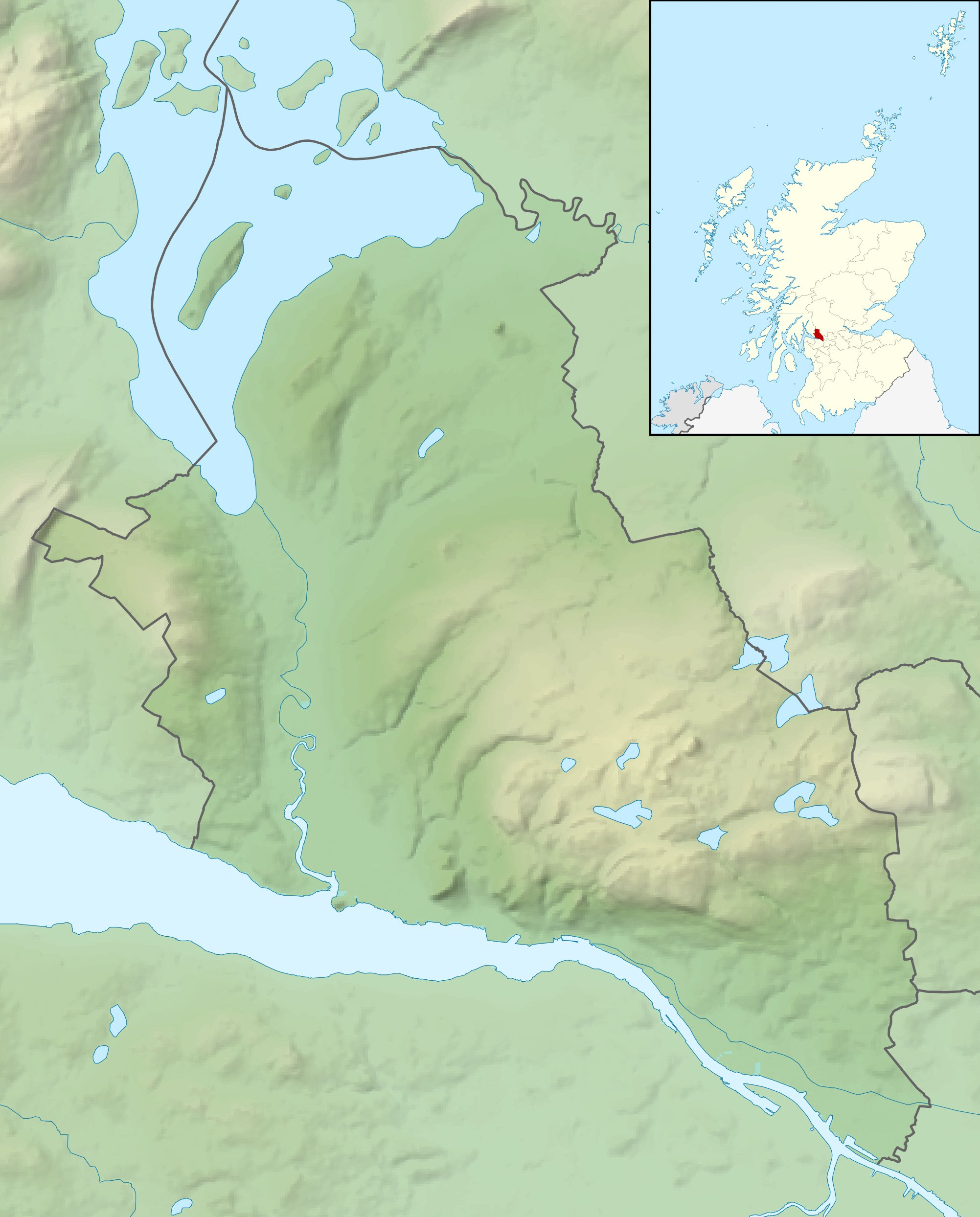
- Location of Dumbarton Rock within West Dunbartonshire

The siege of Dumbarton was a successful four-month siege of the Brittonic fortress at Dumbarton Rock in 870, initiated by the Viking leaders Amlaíb, King of Dublin, and Ímar. Dumbarton was capital of the Kingdom of Alt Clut, the only surviving Brittonic kingdom outside of Wales. It represented a valuable target for the Viking invaders, who were likely motivated by strategic considerations, as well as loot. The attackers may have wished to remove Alt Clut as a maritime power, and the location and defensiveness of Dumbarton itself was of major value.

The siege lasted four-months, a length of time unprecedented in the history of Viking warfare in the British Isles, and ended when the defenders ran out of water. After the siege numerous prisoners were taken and sold into slavery in Dublin. Following this defeat, the power centre of Alt Clut moved to the vicinity of Govan, and it became known as the Kingdom of Strathclyde. The loss of Dumbarton caused the kingdom to increasingly fall under the influence of the Scottish Kingdom of Alba.

== Background ==
Following the Anglo-Saxon invasion of Britain, the Kingdom of Alt Clut was the only remaining Brittonic kingdom outside of Wales. At the time of the siege it was ruled by Arthgal ap Dyfnwal.

For most of the 9th century, Alt Clut had escaped the worst of the Viking invasions of Scotland. By 870, the settlement on Dumbarton Rock was the centre of a small but wealthy kingdom. The site was strategically important, commanding the confluence of the rivers Clyde and Leven. Conquering Dumbarton would make it possible for the Vikings to sail upriver into the central lowlands of Scotland. Dumbarton Rock was an extremely strong defensive position and had previously survived several sieges, including a co-ordinated assault by Angles and Picts in 756.

Following his successful invasion of England, including the conquest of York in 866, Ímar joined forces with Amlaíb, the Scandinavian King of Dublin, to target this prosperous town. Aside from loot, possible objectives might have included neutralising the Britons as a maritime power. No other campaign by Ímar and Amlaíb involved such a concentrated assault in one place, providing evidence of Alt Clut's continuing power at the time.

== Siege ==
In 870 Amlaíb and Ímar gathered their combined forces and launched their attack on Dumbarton. Unable to take the fortress, they besieged the rock for a period of four months, a length of time highly unusual for the period, and unprecedented in the history of Viking warfare in the British Isles. The defenders survived four months of the siege before the well ran dry, forcing them to capitulate.

Accounts of the siege in Welsh chronicles describe the destruction of the summit of Dumbarton Rock. Based on these texts, historian Alan Macquarrie suggests that after a prolonged siege the Norse attackers may have seized the lower part of the rock, where the well was located, forcing the defenders to retreat to the highest craig without a water supply. Once the siege was over the Vikings plundered the fortress, taking many of the defenders captive.

== Aftermath ==
The Annals of Ulster record that once the siege had ended, a fleet of 200 ships transported the prisoners to Dublin. Alongside these prisoners were others, including Picts, Scots and Northumbrians, who had been captured by Ímar and Amlaíb in previous raids. The fate of these prisoners is not known, but with Dublin at the time being one of Europe's premier slave markets it is likely they would end up as slaves.

Following the siege of Alt Clut's royal and religious centre, the kingdom moved 12 miles (19 km) upriver to Govan, while Dumbarton Rock may have become a Viking outpost for a period. After this shift the kingdom became known as the Kingdom of Strathclyde. It is possible that Arthgal escaped the siege and sought safety in Pictland, or alternatively he may have been among the prisoners taken back to Dublin by the Vikings. In 872, Arthgal is recorded as being murdered, possibly on the advice of Constantine I of Scotland.

The kingdom was severely weakened by the siege, as its main fortress had been razed and its political structure was in disarray. The finding of some Norse style ruins in the Clyde area seems to suggest that the fall of Dumbarton led to more Norse influence in the area and the opening up of the kingdom to Norse settlement. It is likely Strathclyde during this time began to fall into the sway of Alba. Nonetheless, Strathclyde is documented in battles and royal records to have existed as an independent kingdom up until some point in the 11th century, when it was peacefully incorporated. The local Cumbric culture would go extinct soon after, dying out at the latest around 1300.

Arthgal would be succeeded by his son Rhun ab Arthgal, who became the King of Strathclyde after his father's death. It is likely that Rhun ruled as a subordinate of Constantine, who was his brother-in-law, providing a possible motive for the death of Arthgal.

== Sources ==
- Archibald, Malcolm (2016). Dance If Ye Can: A Dictionary of Scottish Battles. Creativia. ISBN 978-1536821796.
- BBC (19 September 2014). "The Kingdom of the Britons". BBC History. BBC.
- Broun, Dauvit (2015). "Strathclyde, kingdom of" (PDF). In Cannon, John; Crowcroft, Robert (eds.). The Oxford Companion to British History (2nd ed.). Oxford, UK: Oxford University Press. ISBN 9780199677832. Archived from the original (PDF) on 17 April 2021 – via Credo Reference.
- Cannon, John; Hargreaves, Anne (2009). "Constantine I". The Kings and Queens of Britain. Oxford University Press. doi:10.1093/acref/9780199559220.001.0001. ISBN 9780199559220.
- Clarkson, Tim (2010). The Men of the North: The Britons of Southern Scotland. Birlinn. ISBN 978-1-907909-02-3.
- Clarkson, Tim (2014). Strathclyde: And the Anglo-Saxons in the Viking Age. Birlinn. ISBN 978-1-907909-25-2.
- MacQuarrie, Alan (1998). Alexander, Grant; Stringer, Keith J. (eds.). Medieval Scotland: crown, lordship and community. Edinburgh: Edinburgh University Press. pp. 1–19. ISBN 9780748611102. JSTOR 10.3366/j.ctvxcrx8s.7.
- Márkus, Gilbert (2017). "Vikings and the Formation of Scotia". Conceiving a nation: Scotland to AD 900. Edinburgh: Edinburgh University Press. pp. 228–278. ISBN 978-0748678990. JSTOR 10.3366/j.ctt1pwt3ch.10.
- Historic Environment Scotland. "Dumbarton Castle - History". Historic Environment Scotland.
- The Scotsman (5 December 2016). "Ivar the Boneless and a brutal Viking invasion of Scotland". www.scotsman.com. JPIMedia Publishing ltd.
