= Rotri of Alt Clut =

Rotri was a ruler of Alt Clut, the Brittonic kingdom later known as Strathclyde, for a few years in the mid-8th century. He is known only from the Annales Cambriae, which records his death in the entry for 754. He does not appear in the Welsh genealogies or the Irish annals, which record many other kings of Alt Clut. Historian Alan MacQuarrie suggests he may have usurped the throne following the death of the previous king Teudebur in 752, and then been killed shortly after by Teudebur's son Dumnagual.

== Notes ==
Regnal titles
Preceded by Teudebur	King of Alt Clut; 752-?754	Succeeded by Dumnagual III
