= Dumnagual IV of Alt Clut =

British ruler

Dumnagual IV was a 9th-century British figure thought to have been a ruler of Alt Clut, the kingdom later known as Strathclyde (modern Dumbarton Rock). According to the Harleian genealogies, he was the son of his predecessor Riderch II, the grandson of Eugein II, and the great-grandson of King Dumnagual III of Alt Clut. He is known only from this source, and there is no direct evidence he was king of Alt Clut, although he is usually regarded as such by scholars. The Chronicle of the Kings of Alba reports the burning of Dunblane by the Britons in the year 849, and it is possible that Dumnagual was the British ruler responsible for the act, though it is equally possible that his son Artgal was responsible.

== Notes ==
Regnal titles
Preceded by Riderch?	King of Alt Clut fl. mid-9th century	Succeeded by ?Artgal
