= Dyfnwal, King of Strathclyde =

Dyfnwal
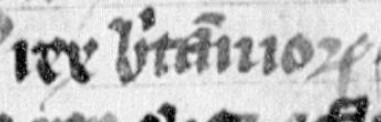
- Dyfnwal's title as it appears on 29r of Paris Bibliothèque Nationale Latin 4126 (the Poppleton manuscript): "rex Britanniorum".

King of Strathclyde
- Successor: Owain ap Dyfnwal
- Died: 908-915
- Issue: probably Owain ap Dyfnwal
- Father: Uncertain, possibly Rhun ab Arthgal or Eochaid ab Rhun

Dyfnwal (died 908 to 915) was King of Strathclyde. (Note: Since the 1990s, academics have accorded Dyfnwal various personal names in English secondary sources: Donald, Donevaldus, Dyfnwal, and Dynwal.) Although his parentage is unknown, he was probably a member of the Cumbrian dynasty that is recorded to have ruled the Kingdom of Strathclyde immediately before him. Dyfnwal is attested by only one source, a mediaeval chronicle that places his death between the years 908 and 915.

== Ancestry ==
Dyfnwal's parentage is uncertain. No historical source accords him a patronym. He could have been a son of Rhun ab Arthgal, the last identifiable King of Strathclyde before Dyfnwal. Rhun was a member of the long-reigning Cumbrian dynasty of Strathclyde. He is the last monarch to be named by a pedigree preserved within a collection of tenth-century Welsh genealogical material known as the Harleian genealogies.

A certain son of Rhun was Eochaid, a man who seems to have possessed a stake in the Scottish kingship before falling from power in the last decades of the ninth century. It is unknown if Eochaid actually ruled the Kingdom of Strathclyde, although it is possible. If Dyfnwal was not a son of Rhun, another possibility is that he descended from Eochaid: either as a son or grandson. Alternately, Dyfnwal could have represented a more distant branch of the same dynasty. If Dyfnwal was indeed a son of Eochaid, a sister of his could have been Eochaid's apparent daughter, Land, the wife of Niall Glúndub mac Áeda attested by the twelfth-century Banshenchas.

== Expansion ==
Rhun's father, Arthgal ap Dyfnwal, ruled the Kingdom of Alt Clut. In the 870s, the kingdom's principal citadel—the eponymous fortress of Alt Clut ("Height of the Clyde")—fell to the Irish-based Scandinavian kings Amlaíb and Ímar. Thereafter, the kingdom's capital seems to have relocated up the River Clyde to the vicinity of Govan and Partick. The relocation is partly exemplified by a shift in royal terminology. Until the fall of Al Clud, for example, the rulers of the realm were styled after the fortress; whereas following the loss of this site, the Kingdom of Al Clud came to be known as the Kingdom of Strathclyde in consequence of its reorientation towards Ystrad Clud (Strathclyde), the valley of the River Clyde. (Note: Either Arthgal or Rhun could have been the first monarch to rule the reconstructed realm of Strathclyde.)

At some point after the loss of Alt Clut, the Kingdom of Strathclyde appears to have undergone a period of expansion. Although the precise chronology is uncertain, by 927 the southern frontier appears to have reached the River Eamont, close to Penrith. The catalyst for this southern extension may have been the dramatic decline of the Kingdom of Northumbria at the hands of conquering Scandinavians, and the expansion may have been facilitated by cooperation between the Cumbrians and insular Scandinavians in the late ninth- and early tenth century. (Note: The expansion of the Cumbrian kingdom may be perceptible in some of the place names of southern Scotland and northern England.) Amiable relations between these powers may be evidenced by the remarkable collection of contemporary Scandinavian-influenced sculpture at Govan.

== Attestation ==
After Eochaid's career, the next notice of the Cumbrian realm is the record of Dyfnwal's death preserved by the ninth- to twelfth-century Chronicle of the Kings of Alba. This is Dyfnwal's only attestation, and his appearance in this source could confirm that he was indeed related to the earlier rulers of Strathclyde. In any case, one particular passage of the chronicle notes the deaths of five kings during the reign of Dyfnwal's Scottish counterpart, Custantín mac Áeda, King of Alba. Dyfnwal is the second of these five; the king before him is Cormac mac Cuilennáin; the ones after him are Domnall mac Áeda, Flann Sinna mac Maíl Sechnaill, and Niall Glúndub. (Note: The fact that the chronicle renders Domnall's kingdom as elig, a term which can be mistakenly interpreted as an abbreviation of eligitur ("he was selected"), has led to the erroneous belief that the ruling Alpínid dynasty of Alba inserted a member of its own—an otherwise unknown brother of Custantín named Domnall—to succeed Dyfnwal.) Although Dyfnwal's death is not specifically dated by the chronicle, the context of the passage suggests that it took place in 908×915. Therefore, if the Chronicle of the Kings of Alba is to be believed, Dyfnwal died no later than 915.

== Successor ==
Dyfnwal appears to have been the father of Owain ap Dyfnwal, a man who succeeded him as King of Strathclyde. Dyfnwal's descendants are recorded to have ruled the Kingdom of Strathclyde into eleventh century.

The personal name Dyfnwal was commonly employed by the Cumbrian royal dynasty. This name lays behind the place name of Dundonald/Dundonald Castle (grid reference NS3636034517), derived from the British *Din Dyfnwal. Although no Cumbrian monarch can be specifically linked to this location, any one of those named Dyfnwal could be the eponym. Another place that could have been named after any of these like-named kings is Cardonald (grid reference NS5364).

== Citations ==
Dyfnwal Died: 908×915
Regnal titles
Unknown Last known title holder: Rhun ab Arthgal^{1}	King of Strathclyde	Succeeded by Owain ap Dyfnwal
Notes and references
1. It is possible that Rhun's son, Eochaid, held the kingship after Rhun.
