= List of kings of Strathclyde =

The list of the kings of Strathclyde concerns the kings of Alt Clut, later Strathclyde, a Brythonic kingdom in what is now western Scotland.

The kingdom was ruled from Dumbarton Rock, Alt Clut, the Brythonic name of the rock, until around 870 when the rock was captured and sacked by Norse-Gaels from the kingdom of Dublin after a four-month siege. Thereafter the centre of the kingdom moved to Govan, previously a religious centre. The kingdom is also known as Cumbria after 870, and indeed may have ruled parts of the modern English region of Cumbria in the 10th and 11th centuries. In the 11th century the kingdom of Alba conquered Strathclyde. It remained a distinctive area, with different laws, using the Cumbric language alongside Gaelic, until the 12th century.

== Kings of Alt Clut ==
Various authorities have suggested a king-list as follows:

- Ceretic Guletic (410–450)
- Dyfnwal Hen/Dumnagual Hen (450–475)
- Erbin (475–480)
- Cinuit (480–485)
- Gereint (485–490)
- Tutagual (490–495)
- Caw (495–501) deposed
- Domgal (501–508)
- Clinoch (508–540)
- Cinbelin (540–558)
- Domgal
- Tutagual / Tudwal (559–573)
- Riderch Hael (fl. (573–612)
- Constantine (?)
- Neithon / Nechtan / Nwython (612–621)
- Beli I (621–633)
- Eugein map Beli (633–645)
- Guret/Gwriad (645–658)
- Mermin (?–682)
- Elfin (?–693)
- Bridei son of Beli I King of the Picts (672–693)
- Dumnagual II (693–694)
- Beli II (694–722)
- Teudebur (722–752)
- Rotri (752–754)
- Dumnagual III (754–760)
- Eugein II (760–780)
- Riderch II (780–798)
- Cynan (798–816)
- Dumnagual IV (816–?)
- Neithon (859–?)
- Arthgal (died 872)

The sources for this king-list are problematic. The earliest source is Adomnán's Life of Saint Columba, which refers to Roderc son of Tothail as reigning in the Rock of Clyde—almost certainly Dumbarton Rock. It is known that Roderc (or Riderc) was a contemporary of Columba, but the date of his death, dependent on the 12th-century Life of Kentigern and an entry in the Annales Cambriae an.CLX+9 Conthigirni obitus...., is unreliable.

The next earliest source is the so-called Iona Chronicle, compiled c. 650–750, deduced from Scottish entries in the Chronicle of Ireland which were later copied into the Annals of Tigernach (AT) and the Annals of Ulster (AU). This preserves information for kings of Alclut from the mid-7th to the mid-8th century, beginning with Gure(i)t regis Alo Cluathe (AU), Domnall mac Auin (AT, AU) Bili mac Elphine (AT, AU) and Taudar mac Bile (AT), were all noted as 'kings of Alclut'. In addition to this, we have a poem preserved in the 10th-century Life of Adomnán which refers to Brude, king of the Picts, as being the son of Bile, king of Alclut.

From this later period too (9th and 10th centuries) are several Welsh sources, particularly the genealogies in Harley 3859, which have been too readily accepted at face value. Whatever else they tell us, they do not confirm that someone who was the father of a king was also a king: thus, none of the individuals listed in them can be said to be 'king of Alclut' without corroboration. Furthermore, it is not clear what the sources for these genealogies were, and to what extent they are independent and factual, or how much they relied on much the same evidence we have today; and, if they lacked information, whether they supplied it.

The Annales Cambriae note s.a. CCX+6 (c. 760) Dunnagual filius Teudubr, who may be the son of Taudar mac Bile of the Annals of Tigernach. The Annales Cambriae does not specify his status, but he may plausibly have been king at Alclut. The following three individuals in the Harleian genealogy, Eugein, Riderch and Dumnagual, are unattested elsewhere. These are repetitions of three of the most famous names in the canon, and it must be suspected that they were supplied to fill a gap in the genealogical record. The insertion of Rotri between Dumnagual and Teudubr is a modern error based on a misinterpretation of Annales Cambriae: s.a. CCX (754) Rotri, rex Brittonum, moritur. This Rhodri is almost certainly Rhodri Molwynog ("bald and grey") m. Idwal Iwrch, a prince of Gwynedd.

It was perhaps believed by the 8th century that Saint Patrick's Coroticus was king at Alclut (the headings added later at Armagh to the chapters of Muirchu's Life of the late 7th century give Coroticus the title Rex Aloo), but there is no witness for this in Patrick's own writings. Cinuit and Dumnagual hen are ancestor figures, the former bearing a truncated form of the sept name Kynwydyon (pre-form *Cunetiones), and are totemistic figures in the genealogy. The name Clinoch is improbable and may be a scribal error for Cliuoc, or Gliuoc.

The most famous figure in the list after Roderc is Eugein map Beli, who is no doubt intended to be Ohan (AT) or Hoan (AU) a king of the Britons who slew Domnall Brecc in an ambush in Strathcarron in 642. This battle is the subject of an awdl in the Y Gododdin collection, but in the poem the victor is not named, only said to be a grandson of Neithon (according to an emended reading of the surviving versions of the text). The poem describes this surprise attack as being launched from a fort above Strathcarron, and it seems likely that Dumyat is intended, a hillfort associated with the Maeatae, who had been attacked a generation earlier by Domnall Brecc's formidable grandfather, Áedán mac Gabráin. It seems likely, therefore, that Ohan/Hoan was a king of the Stirlingshire Britons, and that his action avenged the earlier attack by Áedán. There is no reason to associate Ohan with Alclut, but the genealogist probably felt there was no harm in inserting such a prestigious character, and his grandfather, into the genealogy, particularly if there was a substantial gap to fill between Roderc and Guret, and he may possibly have been the father of Domnall (although the name Ohan/Hoan/Auin/Eugein is very common). It may well be that Ohan's action led to a decline in the power of the Cenél nGabráin and subsequent reoccupation of Dunbartonshire by the British under Gureit. (see now Fraser 2008)

The final puzzle is the identity of Eugein's father Beli. It is to be suspected that this individual is a ghost provoked by the poem in the Life of Adomnán. It is likely that, if there is any truth in the poem, Brude's father was Bili mac Elphine who died in 722, and that his son predeceased him in 693. There is in fact no need to posit another Beli, except to fill another gap in the generations. To take a thoroughly sceptical view of the available evidence, this suggests possibly five distinct dynasties. The first is of the later 6th century, represented by Roderc; the second of the mid-7th century, represented by Guret; the third of the late 7th century, represented by Domnall mac Auin; the fourth of the mid-8th century, represented by the descendants of Elfin; the fifth of the late 9th century, represented by Arthgal and his son, whose kingdom was probably not centred on Alclut.

== King of Strathclyde / Cumbria ==
- ? Arthgal ap Dyfnwal (died 872), either the first King of Strathclyde or else the last King of Alt Clut
- Rhun ab Arthgal
- ? Eochaid, son of Rhun, possible King of Strathclyde or King of the Picts
- Dyfnwal, King of Strathclyde (died 908×915)
- Owain ap Dyfnwal (fl. 934)
- Dyfnwal ab Owain (died 975)
- ? Rhydderch ap Dyfnwal (fl. 971), possible King of Strathclyde
- Máel Coluim, son of Dyfnwal (died 997)
- ? Owain ap Dyfnwal (died 1015), possible King of Strathclyde
- Owain Foel (fl. 1018), last recorded King of Strathclyde
- Máel Coluim, son of the king of the Cumbrians (fl. 1054), possible King of Strathclyde or King of Alba
- David, Prince of the Cumbrians, became David I, King of Scotland, in 1124
