= Clach nam Breatann =

Coordinates: 56°21′26.99″N 4°41′35.24″W

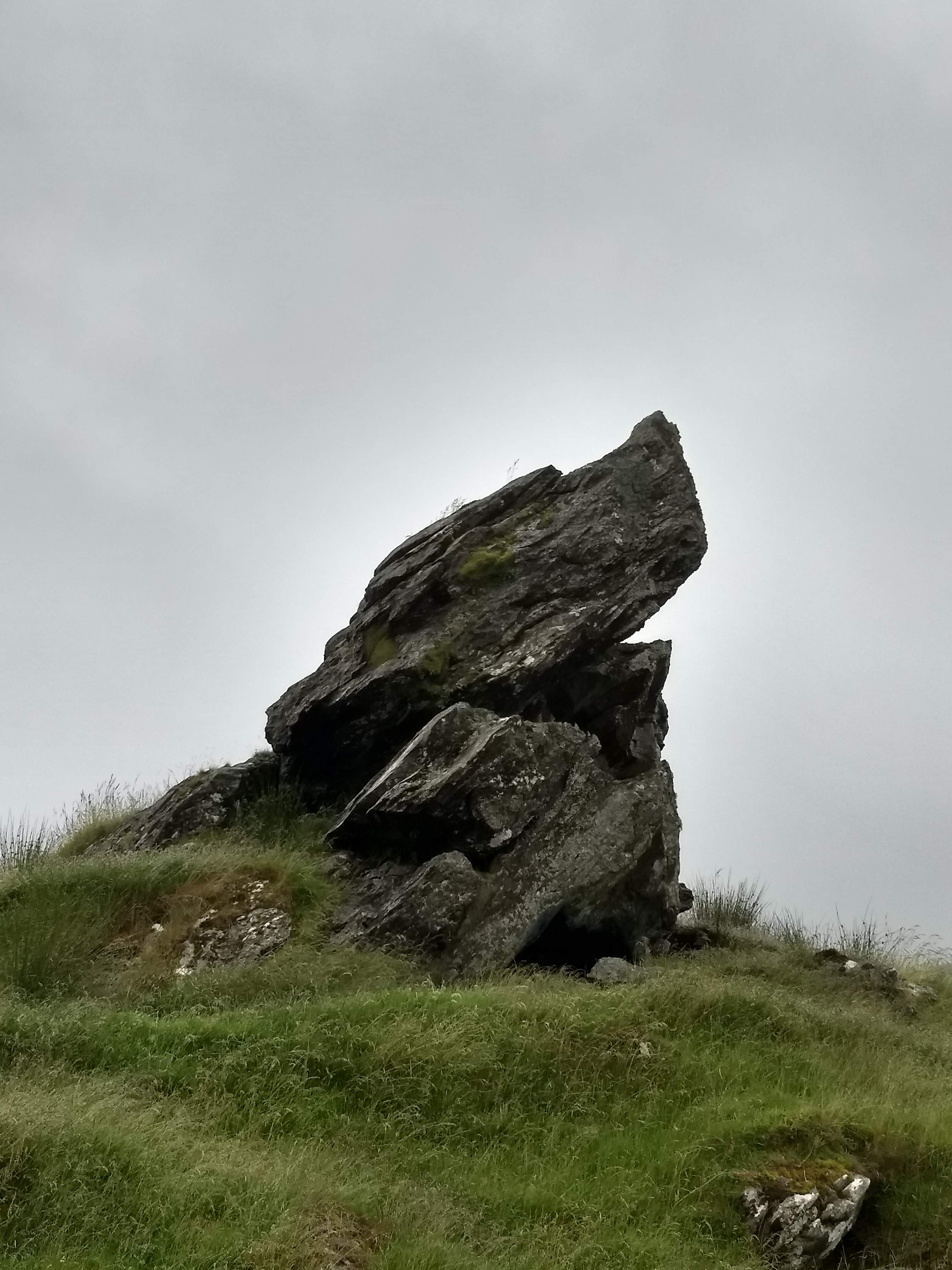
Clach nam Breatann, Glen Falach

The Clach nam Breatann (or Minvircc) is a large stone which marked the boundary between Dál Riata, Alt Clut and the homeland of the Picts in what is now Scotland.

The Stone still stands, on the slopes of Glen Falloch, between Crianlarich and Inverarnan. The base circumference is 180 feet (55 m) and height 12 feet (3.7 m).

There is another boundary stone in Ben Donich, called Clach A' Bhreatunnaich.
