= Riderch II of Alt Clut =

King of Strathclyde

Riderch II was, according to the Harleian genealogies, the son of Eugein II, the son of King Dumnagual III of Alt Clut. He is known only from this source, and there is no direct evidence he was king of Alt Clut (the region around Dumbarton Rock), although he is usually regarded as such by scholars. The Harleian genealogies indicate he was the father of Dumnugual IV, evidently his successor as king.

== Notes ==
Regnal titles
Preceded by Eugein II?	King of Alt Clut fl. early 9th century	Succeeded by ?Dumnagual IV
