= Beli II of Alt Clut =

Beli II (Welsh: Beli ap Elfin; Irish: Bile mac Eilphin; died 722) was a king of Alt Clut, a Brittonic kingdom based on Dumbarton Rock, for some period in the early 8th century.

According to the Harleian genealogies, he was the son of Elfin, one of his predecessors as king. The same genealogy makes him father to Teudebur, his probable successor on the throne. His obituary is noted in the Brut y Tywysogion and the Annals of Ulster under the year 722.

Regnal titles
Preceded by Dumnagual	King of Alt Clut d. 722	Succeeded by Teudebur
