= Erbin of Alt Clut =

Erbin was a 5th-century king of Alt Clut, the extent of which has similarities to modern day Strathclyde, who reigned from c.480-485.

== See also ==
- List of Monarchs of Strathclyde
- List of Scottish Monarchs
- List of Pictish Monarchs
- List of Legendary Pictish Monarchs
- List of British Monarchs
