= Causantín mac Cináeda =

King of the Picts from 862 to 877

Constantine I

King of the Picts
- Reign: 862–877
- Predecessor: Donald I
- Successor: Áed
- Born: c. 836
- Died: 877 possibly Inverdovat, Fife, Scotland
- Burial: Iona
- Issue: Donald II, King of the Picts/of Alba
- House: Alpin
- Father: Kenneth I, King of the Picts (Cináed mac Ailpín)

Causantín mac Cináeda (Note: also Constantín) (Modern Gaelic: Còiseam mac Choinnich; c. 836 – 877) was King of the Picts from 862 until his death in 877. He is often known as Constantine I in reference to his place in modern lists of Scottish monarchs, but contemporary sources described Causantín only as a Pictish king. A son of Cináed mac Ailpín ("Kenneth MacAlpin"), he succeeded his uncle Domnall mac Ailpín as Pictish king following the latter's death on 13 April 862. The reign of Causantín likely saw increased activity by Vikings, based in Ireland, Northumbria and northern Britain. He died fighting one such invasion.

== Sources ==
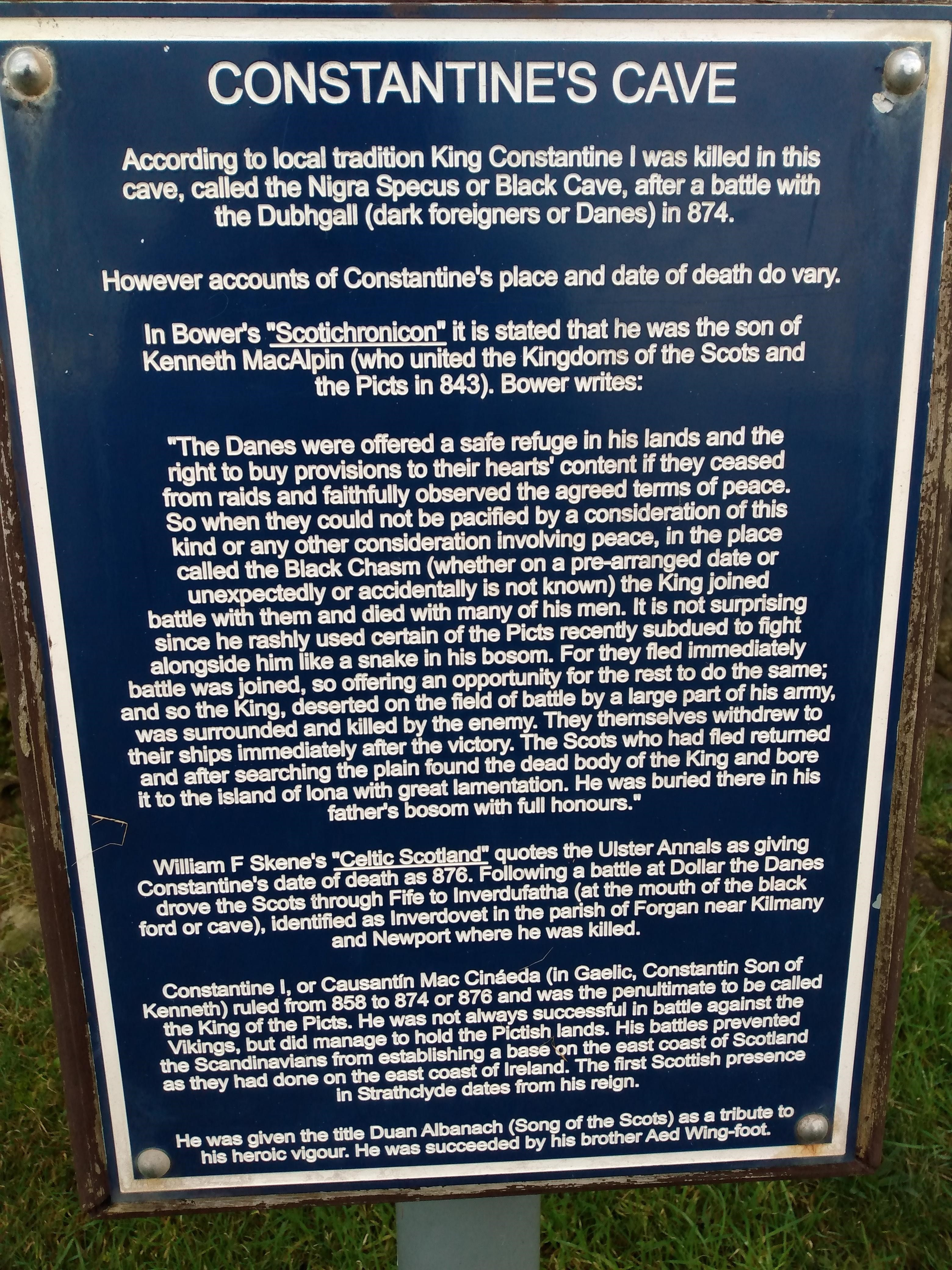
A signboard in Fife, Scotland concerning Causantín

Very few records of 9th-century events in northern Britain survive. The main local source from the period is the Chronicle of the Kings of Alba, a list of kings from Cináed mac Ailpín (died 858) to Cináed mac Maíl Coluim (died 995). The list survives in the Poppleton Manuscript, a 13th-century compilation. Originally simply a list of kings with reign lengths, the other details contained in the Poppleton Manuscript version were added from the tenth century onwards. In addition to this, later king lists survive. The earliest genealogical records of the descendants of Cináed mac Ailpín may date from the end of the tenth century, but their value lies more in their context, and the information they provide about the interests of those for whom they were compiled, than in the unreliable claims they contain. The Pictish king-lists originally ended with this Causantín, who was reckoned the seventieth and last king of the Picts.

For narrative history, the principal sources are the Anglo-Saxon Chronicle and the Irish annals. While Scandinavian sagas describe events in 9th century Britain, their value as sources of historical narrative, rather than documents of social history, is disputed. If the sources for north-eastern Britain, the lands of the kingdom of Northumbria and the former Pictland, are limited and late, those for the areas on the Irish Sea and Atlantic coasts — the modern regions of north-west England and all of northern and western Scotland — are non-existent, and archaeology and toponymy are of primary importance.

== Languages and names ==
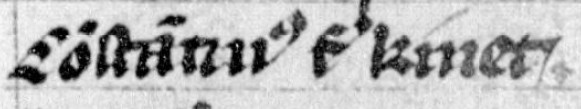
The king's name in the Chronicle of the Kings of Alba, Constantin[us] f[ilius] Kinet

Writing a century before Causantín was born, Bede recorded five languages in Britain. Latin, the common language of the church; Old English, the language of the Angles and Saxons; Irish, spoken on the western coasts of Britain and in Ireland; Brythonic, ancestor of the Welsh language, spoken in large parts of western Britain; and Pictish, spoken in northern Britain. By the ninth century a sixth language, Old Norse, had arrived with the Vikings.

== Amlaíb and Ímar ==
Viking activity in northern Britain appears to have peaked during Causantín's reign. Viking armies were led by a small group of men who may have been kinsmen. Among those noted by the Irish annals, the Chronicle of the Kings of Alba and the Anglo-Saxon Chronicle are Ívarr — Ímar in Irish sources — who was active from East Anglia to Ireland, Halfdán — Albdann in Irish, Healfdene in Old English — and Amlaíb or Óláfr. As well as these leaders, various others related to them appear in the surviving record.

Viking activity in Britain increased in 865 when the Great Heathen Army, probably a part of the forces which had been active in Francia, landed in East Anglia. The following year, having obtained tribute from the East Anglian King Edmund, the Great Army moved north, seizing York, chief city of the Northumbrians. The Great Army defeated an attack on York by the two rivals for the Northumbrian throne, Osberht and Ælla, who had put aside their differences in the face of a common enemy. Both would-be kings were killed in the failed assault, probably on 21 March 867. Following this, the leaders of the Great Army are said to have installed one Ecgberht as king of the Northumbrians. Their next target was Mercia where King Burgred, aided by his brother-in-law King Æthelred of Wessex, drove them off.

While the kingdoms of East Anglia, Mercia and Northumbria were under attack, other Viking armies were active in the far north. Amlaíb and Auisle (Ásl or Auðgísl), said to be his brother, brought an army to Fortriu and obtained tribute and hostages in 866. Historians disagree whether the army returned to Ireland in 866, 867 or even 869. Late sources of uncertain reliability state that Auisle was killed by Amlaíb in 867 in a dispute over Amlaíb's wife, the daughter of Cináed. It is unclear whether, if accurate, this woman should be identified as a daughter of Cináed mac Ailpín, and thus Causantín's sister, or as a daughter of Cináed mac Conaing, king of Brega. While Amlaíb and Auisle were in north Britain, the Annals of Ulster record that Áed Findliath, High King of Ireland, took advantage of their absence to destroy the longphorts along the northern coasts of Ireland. Áed Findliath was married to Causantín's sister Máel Muire. She later married Áed's successor Flann Sinna. Her death is recorded in 913.

In 870, Amlaíb and Ívarr attacked Dumbarton Rock, where the River Leven meets the River Clyde, the chief place of the kingdom of Alt Clut, south-western neighbour of Pictland. The siege lasted four months before the fortress fell to the Vikings who returned to Ireland with many prisoners, "Angles, Britons and Picts", in 871. Archaeological evidence suggests that Dumbarton Rock was largely abandoned and that Govan replaced it as the chief place of the kingdom of Strathclyde, as Alt Clut was later known. King Artgal of Alt Clut did not long survive these events, being killed "at the instigation" of Causantín son of Cináed two years later. Artgal's son and successor Run was married to a sister of Causantín.

Amlaíb disappears from Irish annals after his return to Ireland in 871. According to the Chronicle of the Kings of Alba, he was killed by Causantín either in 871 or 872 when he returned to Pictland to collect further tribute. His ally Ívarr died in 873.

== Last days of the Pictish kingdom ==
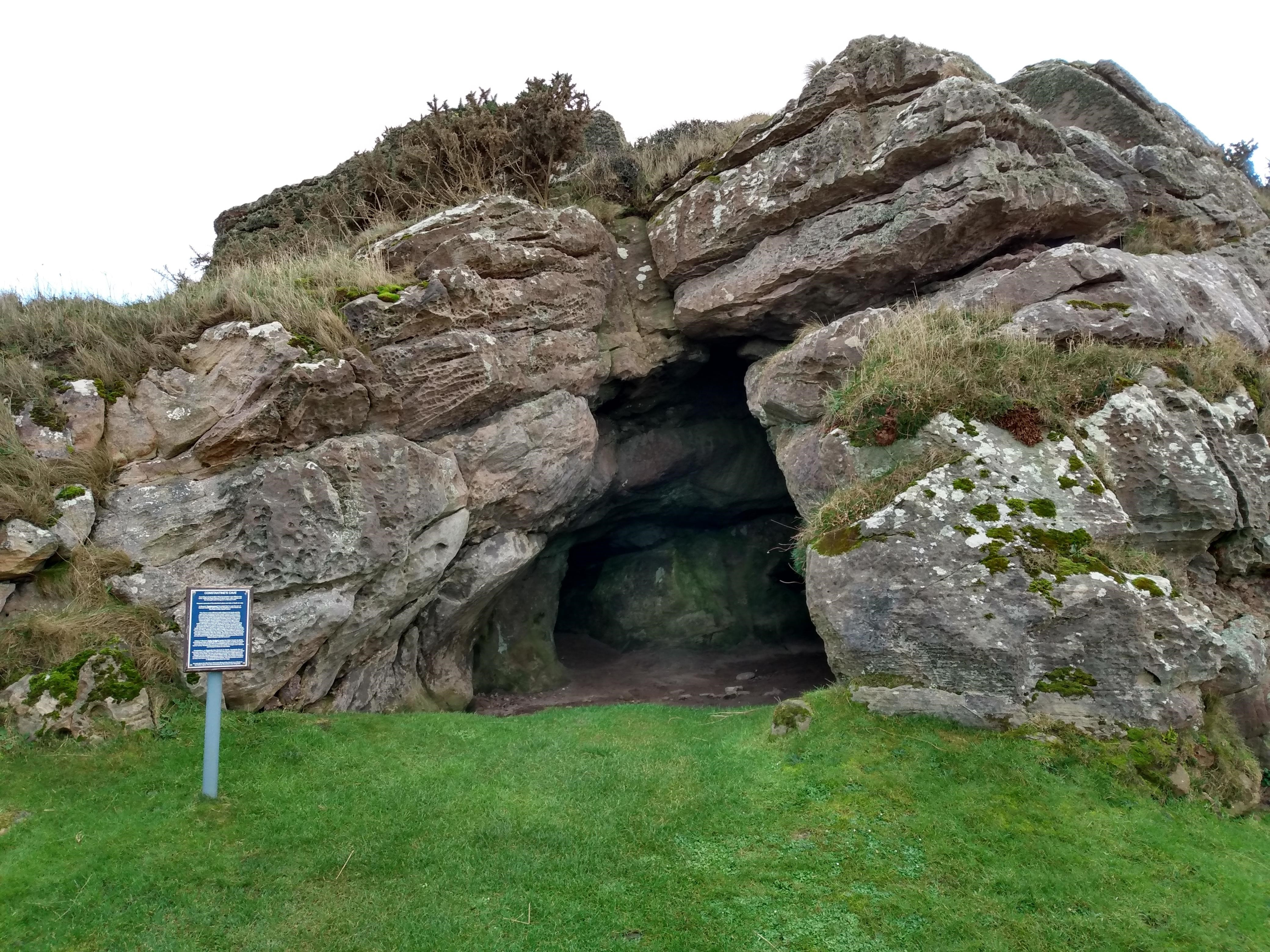
"Constantine's Cave" – also known as the Nigra Specus ("Black Cave") – at Balcomie near Crail in Fife, Scotland: the supposed death place of Causantín

In 875, the Chronicle and the Annals of Ulster again report a Viking army in Pictland; the Annals of Ulster say that "a great slaughter of the Picts resulted". No name is given to the battle in which the slaughter occurred, yet the Chronicle notes a battle fought between Danes and Scots near Dollar but notes a subsequent "annihilation" at Atholl. In 877, shortly after building a new church for the Culdees at St Andrews, Causantín was captured and executed (or perhaps killed in battle) after defending against Viking raiders. Although there is agreement on the time and general manner of his death, it is not clear where this happened. Some believe he was beheaded on a Fife beach, following a battle at Fife Ness, near Crail. William Forbes Skene reads the Chronicle as placing Causantín's death at Inverdovat (by Newport-on-Tay), which appears to match the Prophecy of Berchán. The account in the Chronicle of Melrose names the place as the "Black Cave" and John of Fordun calls it the "Black Den". Causantín was buried on Iona.

== Aftermath ==
Causantín's son Domnall and his descendants represented the main line of the kings of Alba and later Scotland.

== Bibliography ==
- The Annals of Ulster, A.D. 431–1201, CELT: Corpus of Electronic Texts, 2003
- Chronicon Scotorum, CELT: Corpus of Electronic Texts, 2003
- Lebor Bretnach (The Irish version of the Historia Britonum of Nennius), CELT: Corpus of Electronic Texts, 2002
- Anderson, Alan Orr (1990), Early Sources of Scottish History A.D. 500 to 1286, vol. I (2nd ed.), Stamford: Paul Watkins, ISBN 1-871615-03-8
- Anderson, Alan Orr (1908), Scottish Annals from English Chroniclers A.D. 500 to 1286, London: D. Nutt
- Anderson, M. O. (1980), Kings and Kingship in Early Scotland (2nd ed.), Edinburgh: Scottish Academic Press, ISBN 0-7011-1604-8
- Bannerman, John (1999), "The Scottish Takeover of Pictland and the relics of Columba", in Broun, Dauvit; Clancy, Thomas Owen (eds.), Spes Scotorum: Hope of Scots. Saint Columba, Iona and Scotland, Edinburgh: T. & T. Clark, pp. 71–94, ISBN 0-567-08682-8
- Broun, Dauvit (1999), "Dunkeld and the origins of Scottish Identity", in Broun, Dauvit; Clancy, Thomas Owen (eds.), Spes Scotorum: Hope of Scots. Saint Columba, Iona and Scotland, Edinburgh: T. & T. Clark, pp. 96–111, ISBN 0-567-08682-8
- Broun, Dauvit (1999), The Irish Identity of the Kingdom of the Scots in the Twelfth and Thirteenth Centuries, Woodbridge: Boydell Press, ISBN 0-85115-375-5
- Broun, Dauvit; Clancy, Thomas Owen (1999), Spes Scotorum: Hope of Scots. Saint Columba, Iona and Scotland, Edinburgh: T. & T. Clark, ISBN 0-567-08682-8
- Costambeys, Marios (2004). "Hálfdan (d. 877)". Oxford Dictionary of National Biography. Oxford Dictionary of National Biography (online ed.). Oxford University Press. doi:10.1093/ref:odnb/49260. (Subscription, Wikipedia Library access or UK public library membership required.)
- Costambeys, Marios (2004). "Ívarr (d. 873)". Oxford Dictionary of National Biography. Oxford Dictionary of National Biography (online ed.). Oxford University Press. doi:10.1093/ref:odnb/49261. (Subscription, Wikipedia Library access or UK public library membership required.)
- Crawford, Barbara (1987), Scandinavian Scotland, Studies in the Early History of Britain, Leicester: Leicester University Press, ISBN 0-7185-1282-0
- Downham, Clare (2007), Viking Kings of Britain and Ireland: The Dynasty of Ívarr to A.D. 1014, Edinburgh: Dunedin, ISBN 978-1-903765-89-0
- Dumville, David (2000), "The Chronicle of the Kings of Alba", in Taylor, Simon (ed.), Kings, clerics and chronicles in Scotland 500–1297, Dublin: Four Courts Press, pp. 73–86, ISBN 1-85182-516-9
- Duncan, A. A. M. (1978), Scotland: The Making of the Kingdom, The Edinburgh History of Scotland, vol. 1 (2nd ed.), Edinburgh: Edinburgh University Press, ISBN 0-901824-83-6
- Duncan, A. A. M. (2002), The Kingship of the Scots 842–1292: Succession and Independence, Edinburgh: Edinburgh University Press, ISBN 0-7486-1626-8
- Foster, Sally M. (2004) [1996], Picts, Gaels and Scots: Early Historic Scotland, London: Batsford, ISBN 0-7134-8874-3
- Herbert, Máire (2000), "Ri Éirenn, Ri Alban: kingship and identity in the ninth and tenth centuries", in Taylor, Simon (ed.), Kings, clerics and chronicles in Scotland 500–1297 (PDF), Dublin: Four Courts Press, pp. 62–72, ISBN 1-85182-516-9, archived (PDF) from the original on 29 February 2008
- Higham, N. J. (1993), The Kingdom of Northumbria A.D. 350–1100, Stroud: Sutton, ISBN 0-86299-730-5
- Hudson, Benjamin (2004). "Óláf the White (fl. 853–871)". Oxford Dictionary of National Biography. Oxford Dictionary of National Biography (online ed.). Oxford University Press. doi:10.1093/ref:odnb/49263. (Subscription, Wikipedia Library access or UK public library membership required.)
- MacQuarrie, Alan (1997), The Saints of Scotland: Essays in Scottish Church History A.D. 450–1093, Edinburgh: John Donald, ISBN 0-85976-446-X
- Murphy, Dennis, ed. (1896), The Annals of Clonmacnoise, being annals of Ireland from the earliest period to A.D. 1408, Dublin: Royal Society of Antiquaries of Ireland
- Ó Corráin, Donnchadh (1997), "Ireland, Wales, Man and the Hebrides", in Sawyer, Peter (ed.), The Oxford Illustrated History of the Vikings, Oxford: Oxford University Press, pp. 83–109, ISBN 0-19-285434-8
- Ó Corráin, Donnchadh (1998), "The Vikings in Scotland and Ireland in the Ninth Century" (PDF), Peritia, 12: 296–339, doi:10.1484/J.Peri.3.334, archived (PDF) from the original on 16 February 2005
- Radner, Joan N., ed. (1975), Fragmentary Annals of Ireland, CELT: Corpus of Electronic Texts
- Sawyer, Peter, ed. (1997), The Oxford Illustrated History of the Vikings, Oxford: Oxford University Press, ISBN 0-19-285434-8
- Smyth, Alfred P. (1984), Warlords and Holy Men: Scotland A.D. 80–1000, Edinburgh: Edinburgh University Press, ISBN 0-7486-0100-7
- Swanton, Michael (1996), The Anglo-Saxon Chronicle, New York: Routledge, ISBN 0-415-92129-5
- Taylor, Simon, ed. (2000), Kings, clerics and chronicles in Scotland 500–1297, Dublin: Four Courts Press, ISBN 1-85182-516-9
- Woolf, Alex (2007), From Pictland to Alba, 789–1070, The New Edinburgh History of Scotland, vol. 2, Edinburgh: Edinburgh University Press, ISBN 978-0-7486-1234-5

Causantín mac Cináeda House of Alpin Died: 877
Regnal titles
Preceded by Donald I	King of the Picts; 862–877	Succeeded by Áed
