= Eugein II of Alt Clut =

Eugein II may have been ruler of Alt Clut, the Brittonic kingdom later known as Strathclyde, for some time in the late-8th century. He is known only from the Harleian genealogies (British Library, Harley MS 3859), which indicate that he was the son of King Dumnagual III of Alt Clut; there is no direct evidence that he ruled as king himself. Dumnagual is presumed to be the monarch who submitted to the joint army of Kings Óengus I of the Picts and Eadberht of Northumbria in 756; after this event, Alt Clut seems to have remained under foreign power and the royal line is known exclusively through the Harleian genealogies for more than a century. If Eugein was king, he may have been in power during the "burning of Ail Cluaithe" recorded in the Annals of Ulster as having occurred in 780. According to Harleian, he was the father of Riderch II.

== Notes ==
Regnal titles
Preceded by Dumnagual III?	King of Alt Clut fl. late 700s	Succeeded by Riderch II?
