= Teudebur of Alt Clut =

Teudebur of Alt Clut (or Teudebur map Beli) was the ruler of Alt Clut (the area around modern Dumbarton Rock), in the early-to-mid eighth century (probably 722–52). According to the Harleian genealogies, he was the son of Beli II, his probable predecessor as king. Such information is confirmed by both the Irish and Welsh annals. We know from the Harleian genealogy that he was the father of Dumnagual III, one of his successors. His reign coincided with that of the illustrious Pictish king Óengus mac Fergusa (Onuist map Uurguist). The Annales Cambriae reports that in 750, the Britons defeated a Pictish army at Mocetauc (Mygedawc), in which, according to the Annals of Tigernach, Óengus' brother Talorgen was killed. Mygedawc is often identified with modern Mugdock, on the boundary between Dunbartonshire and Stirlingshire, but this identity is by no means certain. The Annals of Tigernach, which styles him Taudar mac Bile, rí Alo Cluaide, put his death at 752, and for this reason, we can be certain Teudebur was the British king responsible for the British victory.

== Notes ==
Regnal titles
Preceded by Beli	King of Alt Clut; 722-752	Succeeded by Rotri
