= Dumnagual III of Alt Clut =

King of Strathclyde

Dumnagual III (Welsh: Dyfnwal ap Tewdwr, died c. 760) was a king of Strathclyde in the mid-eighth century (probably 754–760). According to the Harleian genealogies, he was the son of Teudebur, one of his predecessors.

According to Symeon of Durham, his kingdom was invaded by both King Óengus I of the Picts and King Eadberht of Northumbria. The same source indicates that on August 1, 756, they arrived at Alt Clut (Dumbarton Rock, Dumnagual's capital) and obtained the homage of the Britons. However, nine days later, the Northumbrian king's army was destroyed while Eadberht was leading it between "Ouania" and "Niwanbirig", probably meaning "Govan" and "Anglian Northumbria". Dumnagual is usually regarded as the king of Alt Clut in the period, but it has also been suggested that the destroyer of the Northumbrian army was Óengus. Phillimore's reconstruction of the Annales Cambriae puts Dumnagual's death in battle at 760. It is thought likely that the territory of Alt Clut remained under Pictish or joint Pictish and English control in the years following his death. Dumnagual is the last British king of Alt Clut to be known as anything more than a name until the later ninth century.

Regnal titles
| Preceded by Rotri | King of Alt Clut; 754–60 | Succeeded by ?Eugein |
