= Kingdom of Strathclyde =

Brittonic kingdom in early medieval Britain

Coordinates: 56°N 4°W

Kingdom of Strathclyde Alt Clud Cumbria
- 5th century–c. 1030
- The Kingdom of Strathclyde in the 9th–10th centuries
- Capital: Dumbarton and Govan
- Common languages: Cumbric
- Government: Monarchy
- Historical era: Middle Ages
  - Established: 5th century
  - Incorporated into the Kingdom of Scotland: c. 1030
Preceded by	Succeeded by
Sub-Roman Britain	Kingdom of Scotland
- Today part of: Scotland; England

Strathclyde (Welsh: Ystrad Clud, 'Valley of the Clyde'), also known as Cumbria, was a Brittonic kingdom in northern Britain during the Middle Ages. It comprised parts of what is now southern Scotland and North West England, a region the Welsh tribes referred to as Yr Hen Ogledd ('the Old North'). At its greatest extent in the 10th century, it stretched from Loch Lomond in the north to the River Eamont at Penrith in the south. Strathclyde seems to have been annexed by the Goidelic-speaking Kingdom of Alba in the 11th century, becoming part of the emerging Kingdom of Scotland.

In its early days it was called the kingdom of Alt Clud, and controlled the region around its capital Dumbarton Rock. This kingdom emerged during Britain's post-Roman period and may have been founded by the Damnonii people. After the sack of Dumbarton by a Viking army from Dublin in 870, the capital seems to have moved to Govan and the kingdom became known as Strathclyde. It expanded south to the Cumbrian Mountains, into the former lands of Rheged. The neighbouring Anglo-Saxons called this enlarged kingdom Cumbraland. It is not known what the inhabitants called it, though it may have been "Cumbria".

The language of Strathclyde is known as Cumbric, which was closely related to Old Welsh. Its inhabitants were referred to as Cumbrians. There was some later settlement by Vikings or Norse–Gaels, although to a lesser degree than in neighbouring Galloway. A small number of Anglian place-names show some settlement by Anglo-Saxons from Northumbria. Owing to the series of language changes in the area, it is unclear whether any Gaelic settlement took place before the 11th century.

== Origins ==
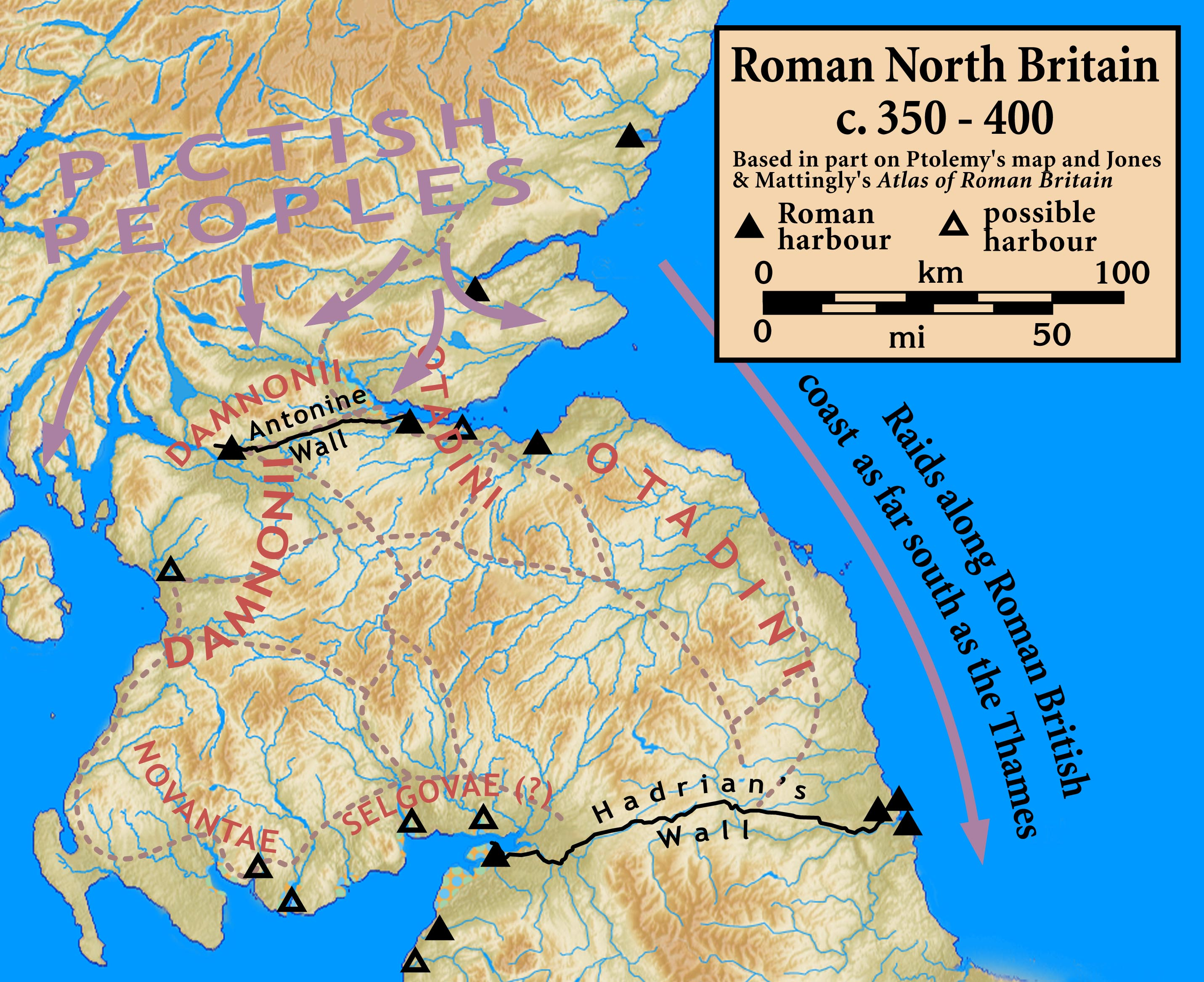
Map of northern Roman Britannia, c.350–400

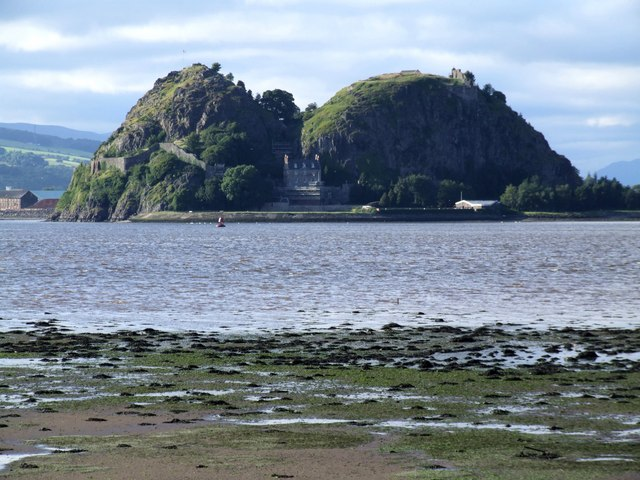
Looking north at Dumbarton Rock, the chief fort of Strathclyde from the 6th century to 870. The fort of Alt Clut was on the right-hand summit.

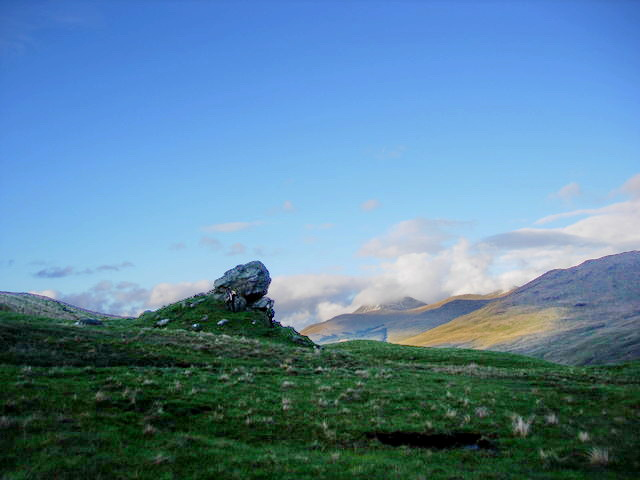
Clach nam Breatann, Glen Falloch, likely the northern edge of Strathclyde

Ptolemy's Geographia – a sailors' chart, not an ethnographical survey – lists a number of tribes, or groups of tribes, in southern Scotland at around the time of the Roman invasion and the establishment of Roman Britain in the 1st century AD. As well as the Damnonii, Ptolemy lists the Otalini, whose capital appears to have been Traprain Law; to their west, the Selgovae in the Southern Uplands and, further west in Galloway, the Novantae. In addition, a group known as the Maeatae, probably in the area around Stirling, appear in later Roman records. The capital of the Damnonii is believed to have been at Carman Hill, near Dumbarton, but around five miles inland from the River Clyde.

Although the northern frontier of Roman Britain was Hadrian's Wall for most of its history, the extent of Roman influence north of the Wall is obscure. Certainly, Roman forts existed north of the wall, and forts as far north as Cramond may have been in long-term occupation. Moreover, the formal frontier was three times moved further north. Twice it was advanced to the line of the Antonine Wall, at about the time when Hadrian's Wall was built and again under Septimius Severus, and once further north, beyond the river Tay, during Agricola's campaigns, although, each time, it was soon withdrawn. In addition to these contacts, Roman armies undertook punitive expeditions north of the frontiers. Northern natives also travelled south of the wall, to trade, to raid and to serve in the Roman army. Roman traders may have travelled north, and Roman subsidies, or bribes, were sent to useful tribes and leaders. The extent to which Roman Britain was romanised is debated, and if there are doubts about the areas under close Roman control, then there must be even more doubts over the degree to which the Damnonii were romanised.

The final period of Roman Britain saw an apparent increase in attacks by land and sea, the raiders including the Picts, Scotti and the mysterious Attacotti whose origins are not certain. These raids will have also targeted the tribes of southern Scotland. The supposed final withdrawal of Roman forces around 410 is unlikely to have been of military impact on the Damnonii, although the withdrawal of pay from the residual Wall garrison will have had a very considerable economic effect.

No historical source gives any firm information on the boundaries of the Kingdom of Strathclyde, but suggestions have been offered on the basis of place-names and topography. Near the north end of Loch Lomond, which can be reached by boat from the Clyde, lies Clach nam Breatann, the Rock of the Britains, which is thought to have gained its name as a marker at the northern limit of Alt Clut. The Campsie Fells and the marshes between Loch Lomond and Stirling may have represented another boundary. To the south, the kingdom extended some distance up the strath of the Clyde, and along the coast probably extended south towards Ayr.

== History ==
=== Old North ===
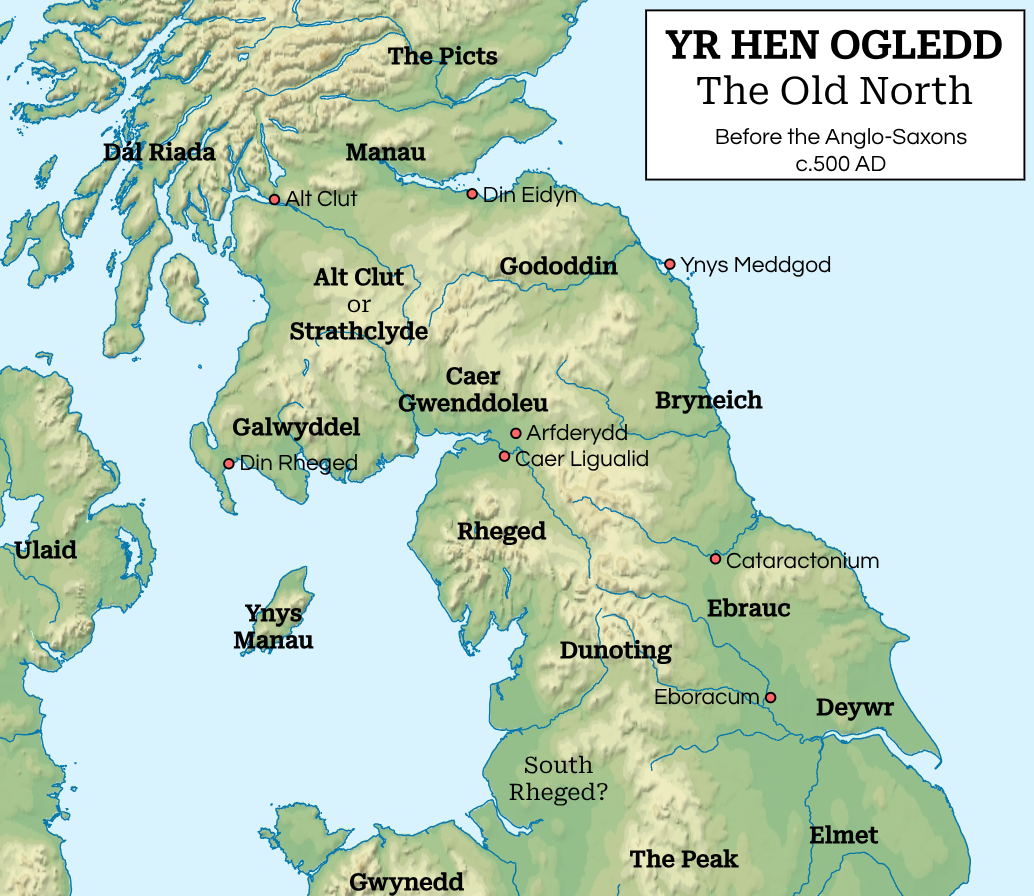
Map of the "Old North" of post-Roman Britain around 500 AD

The written sources available for the period are largely Irish and Welsh, and very few indeed are contemporary with the period between 400 and 600. Irish sources report events in the kingdom of Dumbarton only when they have an Irish link. Excepting the 6th-century jeremiad by Gildas and the poetry attributed to Taliesin and Aneirin—in particular y Gododdin, thought to have been composed in the 6th century—Welsh sources generally date from a much later period. Some are informed by the political attitudes prevalent in Wales in the 9th century and after. Bede, whose prejudice is apparent, rarely mentions Britons, and then usually in uncomplimentary terms.

Two kings are known from near contemporary sources in this early period. The first is Coroticus or Ceretic Guletic (Welsh: Ceredig), known as the recipient of a letter from Saint Patrick, and stated by a 7th-century biographer to have been king of the Height of the Clyde, Dumbarton Rock, placing him in the second half of the 5th century. From Patrick's letter it is clear that Ceretic was a Christian, and it is likely that the ruling class of the area were also Christians, at least in name. His descendant Rhydderch Hael is named in Adomnán's Life of Saint Columba. Rhydderch was a contemporary of Áedán mac Gabráin of Dál Riata and Urien of Rheged, to whom he is linked by various traditions and tales, and also of Æthelfrith of Bernicia.

The Christianisation of southern Scotland, if Patrick's letter to Coroticus was indeed to a king in Strathclyde, had therefore made considerable progress when the first historical sources appear. Further south, at Whithorn, a Christian inscription is known from the second half of the 5th century, perhaps commemorating a new church. How this came about is unknown. Unlike Columba, Kentigern (Welsh: Cyndeyrn Garthwys), the supposed apostle to the Britons of the Clyde, is a shadowy figure and Jocelyn of Furness's 12th century Life is late and of doubtful authenticity though Jackson believed that Jocelyn's version might have been based on an earlier Cumbric-language original.

=== Kingdom of Alt Clut ===
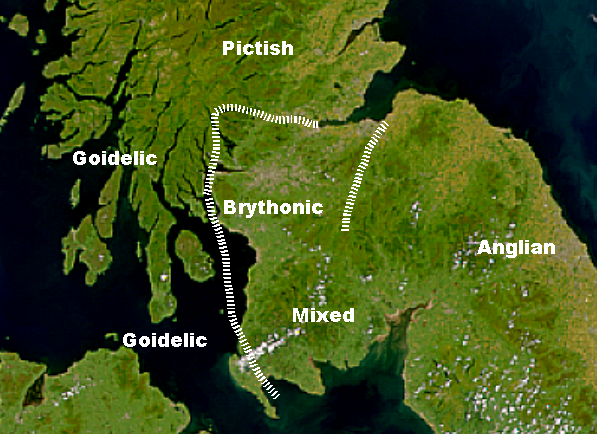
Possible language zones in southern Scotland, 7th–8th centuries (after Nicolaisen, Scottish Place-Names and Taylor, "Place Names").

After 600, information on the Britons of Alt Clut becomes slightly more common in the sources. However, historians have disagreed as to how these should be interpreted. Broadly speaking, they have tended to produce theories which place their subject at the centre of the history of north Britain in the Early Historic period. The result is a series of narratives which cannot be reconciled. More recent historiography may have gone some way to addressing this problem.

At the beginning of the 7th century, Áedán mac Gabráin may have been the most powerful king in northern Britain, and Dál Riata was at its height. Áedán's byname in later Welsh poetry, Aeddan Fradawg (Áedán the Treacherous) does not speak to a favourable reputation among the Britons of Alt Clut, and it may be that he seized control of Alt Clut. Áedán's dominance came to an end around 604, when his army, including Irish kings and Bernician exiles, was defeated by Æthelfrith at the Battle of Degsastan.

It is supposed, on rather weak evidence, that Æthelfrith, his successor Edwin and Bernician and Northumbrian kings after them expanded into southern Scotland. Such evidence as there is, such as the conquest of Elmet, the wars in north Wales and with Mercia, would argue for a more southerly focus of Northumbrian activity in the first half of the 7th century. The report in the Annals of Ulster for 638, "the battle of Glenn Muiresan and the besieging of Eten" (Eidyn, later Edinburgh), has been taken to represent the capture of Eidyn by the Northumbrian king Oswald, son of Æthelfrith, but the Annals mention neither capture, nor Northumbrians, so this is rather a tenuous identification.

In 642, the Annals of Ulster report that the Britons of Alt Clut led by Eugein son of Beli defeated the men of Dál Riata and killed Domnall Brecc, grandson of Áedán, at Strathcarron, and this victory is also recorded in an addition to Y Gododdin. The site of this battle lies in the area known in later Welsh sources as Bannawg—the name Bannockburn is presumed to be related—which is thought to have meant the very extensive marshes and bogs between Loch Lomond and the river Forth, and the hills and lochs to the north, which separated the lands of the Britons from those of Dál Riata and the Picts, and this land was not worth fighting over. However, the lands to the south and east of this waste were controlled by smaller, nameless British kingdoms. Powerful neighbouring kings, whether in Alt Clut, Dál Riata, Pictland or Bernicia, would have imposed tribute on these petty kings, and wars for the overlordship of this area seem to have been regular events in the 6th to 8th centuries.

There are few definite reports of Alt Clut in the remainder of the 7th century, although it is possible that the Irish annals contain entries which may be related to Alt Clut. In the last quarter of the 7th century, a number of battles in Ireland, largely in areas along the Irish Sea coast, are reported where Britons take part. It is usually assumed that these Britons are mercenaries, or exiles dispossessed by some Anglo-Saxon conquest in northern Britain. However, it may be that these represent campaigns by kings of Alt Clut, whose kingdom was certainly part of the region linked by the Irish Sea. All of Alt Clut's neighbours, Northumbria, Pictland and Dál Riata, are known to have sent armies to Ireland on occasions.

The Annals of Ulster in the early 8th century report two battles between Alt Clut and Dál Riata, at "Lorg Ecclet" (unknown) in 711, and at "the rock called Minuirc" in 717. Whether their appearance in the record has any significance or whether it is just happenstance is unclear. Later in the 8th century, it appears that the Pictish king Óengus made at least three campaigns against Alt Clut, none successful. In 744 the Picts acted alone, and in 750 Óengus may have cooperated with Eadberht of Northumbria in a campaign in which Talorgan, brother of Óengus, was killed in a heavy Pictish defeat at the hands of Teudebur of Alt Clut, perhaps at Mugdock, near Milngavie. Eadberht is said to have taken the plain of Kyle in 750, around modern Ayr, presumably from Alt Clut.

Teudebur died around 752, and it was probably his son Dumnagual who faced a joint effort by Óengus and Eadberht in 756. The Picts and Northumbrians laid siege to Dumbarton Rock, and extracted a submission from Dumnagual. It is doubtful whether the agreement, whatever it may have been, was kept, for Eadberht's army was all but wiped out—whether by their supposed allies or by recent enemies is unclear—on its way back to Northumbria.

After this, little is heard of Alt Clut or its kings until the 9th century. The "burning", the usual term for capture, of Alt Clut is reported in 780, although by whom and in what circumstances is not known. Thereafter Dunblane was burned by the men of Alt Clut in 849, perhaps in the reign of Artgal.

=== Viking Age ===
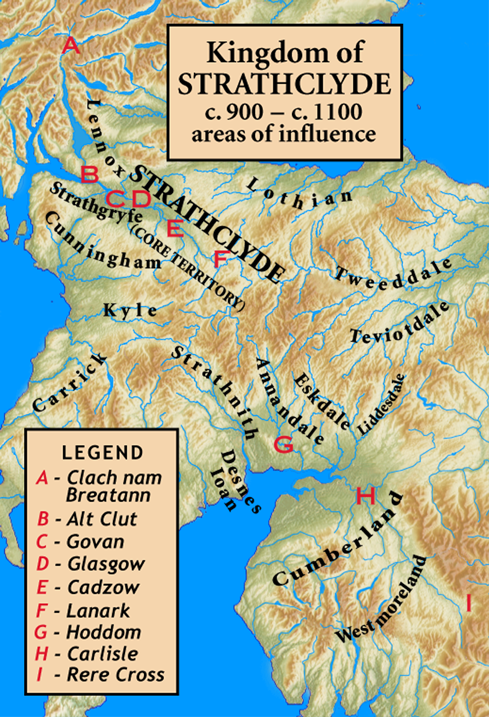
The major sites associated with the kingdom in the 10th and 11th centuries

An army, led by the Viking chiefs known in Irish as Amlaíb Conung and Ímar, laid siege in 870 to Alt Clut, a siege which lasted some four months and led to the destruction of the citadel and the taking of a very large number of captives. The siege and capture are reported by Welsh and Irish sources, and the Annals of Ulster say that in 871, after overwintering on the Clyde:

Amlaíb and Ímar returned to Áth Cliath (Dublin) from Alba with two hundred ships, bringing away with them in captivity to Ireland a great prey of Angles and Britons and Picts.

King Arthgal ap Dyfnwal, called "king of the Britons of Strathclyde", was killed in Dublin in 872 at the instigation of Causantín mac Cináeda. He was followed by his son Run of Alt Clut, who was married to Causantín's sister. Eochaid, the result of this marriage, may have been king of Strathclyde, or of the kingdom of Alba.

From this time forward, and perhaps from much earlier, the kingdom of Strathclyde was subject to periodic domination by the kings of Alba. However, the earlier idea, that the heirs to the Scots throne ruled Strathclyde, or Cumbria as an appanage, has relatively little support, and the degree of Scots control should not be overstated. This period probably saw a degree of Norse, or Norse-Gael settlement in Strathclyde. A number of place-names, in particular a cluster on the coast facing the Cumbraes, and monuments such as the hogback graves at Govan, are some of the remains of these newcomers.

In the late ninth century, the Vikings almost conquered England, apart from the southern kingdom of Wessex, but in the 910s the West Saxon king Edward the Elder and his sister Æthelflæd, Lady of the Mercians, recovered England south of the Humber. According to the Fragmentary Annals of Ireland, Æthelflæd formed an alliance with Strathclyde and Scotland against the Vikings, and, in the view of the historian Tim Clarkson, Strathclyde seems to have made substantial territorial gains at this time, some at the expense of the Norse Vikings. The Anglo-Saxon Chronicle states that in 920 the kings of Britain, including the king of Strathclyde (who is not named), submitted to Edward. However, historians are sceptical of the claim as Edward's power was confined to southern Britain, and they think it was probably a peace settlement which did not involve submission. The names of Strathclyde's rulers in this period are uncertain, but Dyfnwal is thought to have been king in the early tenth century, and he was probably succeeded by his son Owain before 920.

In 927 Edward's son Æthelstan conquered Viking-ruled Northumbria, and thus became the first king of England. At Eamont Bridge on 27 July several kings accepted his overlordship, including Constantine of Scotland. Sources differ on whether the meeting was attended by Owain of Strathclyde or Owain ap Hywel of Gwent, but it could have been both. In 934 Æthelstan invaded Scotland and laid waste to the country. Owain was an ally of the Scottish king and it is likely that Strathclyde was also ravaged. Owain attested Æthelstan's charters as sub-king in 931 and 935 (charters S 413, 434 and 1792), but in 937 he joined Constantine and the Vikings in invading England. The result was an overwhelming victory for the English at the Battle of Brunanburh.

Following the battle of Brunanburh, Owain's son Dyfnwal ab Owain became king of Strathclyde. It is likely that whereas Scotland allied with England, Strathclyde held to its alliance with the Vikings. In 945, Æthelstan's half-brother Edmund, who had succeeded to the English throne in 939, ravaged Strathclyde. According to the thirteenth-century chronicler Roger of Wendover, Edmund had two sons of Dyfnwal blinded, perhaps to deprive their father of throneworthy heirs. Edmund then gave the kingdom to King Malcolm I of Scotland in return for a pledge to defend it on land and on sea, but Dyfnwal soon recovered his kingdom. He died on pilgrimage to Rome in 975.

=== End of Strathclyde ===
If the kings of Alba imagined, as John of Fordun did, that they were rulers of Strathclyde, the death of Cuilén mac Iduilb and his brother Eochaid at the hands of Rhydderch ap Dyfnwal in 971, said to be in revenge for the rape or abduction of his daughter, shows otherwise. A major source for confusion comes from the name of Rhydderch's successor, Máel Coluim, now thought to be a son of the Dyfnwal ab Owain who died in Rome, but long confused with the later king of Scots Máel Coluim mac Cináeda. Máel Coluim appears to have been followed by Owen the Bald who is thought to have died at the battle of Carham in 1018. It seems likely that Owen had a successor, although his name is unknown. The Kingdom of Strathclyde appears to have collapsed under the combined pressures of both the Gall-Goídil and the expanding Earldom of Bamburgh, as well as from the Kingdom of Alba, around the turn of the first millennium.

Some time after 1018 and before 1054, the kingdom of Strathclyde appears to have been conquered by the Scots, most probably during the reign of Máel Coluim mac Cináeda who died in 1034. In 1054, the English king Edward the Confessor dispatched Earl Siward of Northumbria against the Scots, ruled by Mac Bethad mac Findláich (Macbeth), along with an otherwise unknown "Malcolm son of the king of the Cumbrians", in Strathclyde. The name Malcolm or Máel Coluim again caused confusion, some historians later supposing that this was the later king of Scots Máel Coluim mac Donnchada (Máel Coluim Cenn Mór). It is not known if Malcolm/Máel Coluim ever became "king of the Cumbrians", or, if so, for how long.

The Keswick area was conquered by the Anglo-Saxon Kingdom of Northumbria in the 7th century, but Northumbria was destroyed by the Vikings in the late 9th. In the early 10th century it became part of Strathclyde; it remained part of Strathclyde until about 1050, when Siward, Earl of Northumbria, conquered that part of Cumbria.

Carlisle was part of Scotland by 1066, and thus was not recorded in the 1086 Domesday Book. This changed in 1092, when William the Conqueror's son William Rufus invaded the region and incorporated Cumberland into England. The construction of Carlisle Castle began in 1093 on the site of the Roman fort, south of the River Eden. The castle was rebuilt in stone in 1112, with a keep and the city walls.

By the 1070s, if not earlier in the reign of Máel Coluim mac Donnchada, it appears that the Scots again controlled Strathclyde. It is certain that Strathclyde did indeed become an appanage, for it was granted by Alexander I to his brother David, Prince of the Cumbrians, later David I, in 1107.

== See also ==
- List of Kings of Strathclyde

== Sources ==
- Alcock, Leslie, Kings and Warriors, Craftsmen and Priests in Northern Britain AD 550–850. Society of Antiquaries of Scotland, Edinburgh, 2003. ISBN 0-903903-24-5
- Barrell, A.D.M., Medieval Scotland. Cambridge University Press, Cambridge, 2000. ISBN 0-521-58602-X
- Clarkson, Tim (2014). Strathclyde and the Anglo-Saxons in the Viking Age. Edinburgh: John Donald, Birlinn Ltd. ISBN 978-1-906566-78-4.
- Davidson, Michael (2001). "The (Non) Submission of the Northern Kings in 920". In Higham, N. J.; Hill, D. H. (eds.). Edward the Elder 899–924. Abingdon, Oxfordshire: Routledge. pp. 200–11. ISBN 978-0-415-21497-1.
- Duncan, A.A.M., The Kingship of the Scots 842–1292: Succession and Independence. Edinburgh University Press, Edinburgh, 2002. ISBN 0-7486-1626-8
- Hanson, W.S., "Northern England and southern Scotland: Roman Occupation" in Michael Lynch (ed.), The Oxford Companion to Scottish History. Oxford UP, Oxford, 2001. ISBN 0-19-211696-7
- Keynes, Simon (2002). An Atlas of Attestations in Anglo-Saxon Charters, c.670–1066. Cambridge, UK: Dept. of Anglo-Saxon, Norse, and Celtic, University of Cambridge, UK. ISBN 978-0-9532697-6-1.
- Koch, John, "The Place of 'Y Gododdin' in the History of Scotland" in Ronald Black, William Gillies and Roibeard Ó Maolalaigh (eds) Celtic Connections. Proceedings of the 10th International Congress of Celtic Studies, Volume One. Tuckwell, East Linton, 1999. ISBN 1-898410-77-1
- Smyth, Alfred P (1984). Warlords and Holy Men: Scotland AD 80–1000. Edward Arnold. ISBN 978-0-7131-6305-6.
- Stenton, Frank (1971). Anglo-Saxon England (3rd ed.). Oxford University Press. ISBN 978-0-19-280139-5.

=== Further reading ===
- Barrow, G.W.S., Kingship and Unity: Scotland 1000–1306. Edinburgh University Press, Edinburgh, (corrected edn) 1989. ISBN 0-7486-0104-X
- Broun, D. (2004). "The Welsh Identity of the Kingdom of Strathclyde c. 900–c. 1200". Innes Review. 55 (55): 111–80. doi:10.3366/inr.2004.55.2.111.
- Charles-Edwards, T. M. (2013). Wales and the Britons 350–1064. Oxford: Oxford University Press. ISBN 978-0-19-821731-2.
- Clarkson, Tim (2010). The Men of the North: The Britons of Southern Scotland. Edinburgh: John Donald, Birlinn Ltd. ISBN 978-1-906566-18-0.
- Driscoll, Stephen (2013). In Search of the Northern Britons in the Early Historic Era (AD 400–1100) (PDF). Culture and Sport Glasgow (Glasgow Museums).
- Edmonds, Fiona (October 2014). "The Emergence and Transformation of Medieval Cumbria". The Scottish Historical Review. XCIII, 2 (237): 195–216. doi:10.3366/shr.2014.0216.
- Edmonds, Fiona (2015). "The expansion of the kingdom of Strathclyde". Early Medieval Europe. 23: 43–66. doi:10.1111/emed.12087. S2CID 162103346.
- Foster, Sally M., Picts, Gaels, and Scots: Early Historic Scotland. Batsford, London, 2nd edn, 2004. ISBN 0-7134-8874-3
- Higham, N.J., The Kingdom of Northumbria AD 350–1100. Sutton, Stroud, 1993. ISBN 0-86299-730-5
- Jackson, Kenneth H., "The Britons in southern Scotland" in Antiquity, vol. 29 (1955), pp. 77–88. ISSN 0003-598X .
- Lowe, Chris, Angels, Fools and Tyrants: Britons and Anglo-Saxons in Southern Scotland. Canongate, Edinburgh, 1999. ISBN 0-86241-875-5
- Woolf, Alex (2001). "Britons and Angles". In Lynch, Michael (ed.). The Oxford Companion to Scottish History. Oxford, UK: Oxford University Press. ISBN 9780199234820.
