= Young Siward =

- Macbeth character
- Created by: William Shakespeare

In-universe information
- Affiliation: England, Macduff
- Family: Siward

Young Siward is a character in William Shakespeare’s play Macbeth (1606). He is the son of Siward, general of the English forces in the battle against Macbeth. Macbeth kills him in the final battle, shortly before his swordfight with Lord Macduff.

He is based on the real-life historical figure of Osbeorn Bulax.

== Role in the Play ==
He first appears in scene 5.2, as the English forces join with the Scottish. Lennox refers to him as one of many “unrough youths” who “protest their first of manhood.” If he is an “unrough” youth, then he is too young to grow a beard and is probably around fifteen or sixteen. Also, to protest his "first of manhood” means that he is eager to prove himself as a man.

He next appears in scenes 5.4 and 5.6 as the troops enter Birnam Wood and Malcolm orders him and his father to lead the first battalion against Macbeth.

His final appearance occurs in scene 5.7 when he comes across Macbeth and attacks, calling him “an abhorred tyrant.” Macbeth slays him and exits the stage.

In the final scene of the play, Ross informs Siward of his son’s death, saying “like a man he died.” Siward expresses his gratitude that his son died honorably, and says he is sure that his son has become a soldier of God.

== Significance ==
In his article about the death of Young Siward, Karl F. Zender writes:

In a play dominated by ideas and images of damnation and demoniacal possession, we should take quite seriously Young Siward’s association of Macbeth's "name" and "title" with the devil and hell. The situation here resembles Ephesians 6:10–17, where we are told that the Christian warrior should "wrestle...against the worldly governours, the princes of the darknesse of this world." As Young Siward's associations imply, Macbeth is now one of those "worldly governours," and is in league with "the princes of the darknesse." And if we recall that part of the "whole armour" mentioned in Ephesians is the "sword of the Spirit, which is the word of God," then Young Siward's "with my sword / I'll prove the lie thou speak'st" (V. vii. 10–11) is particularly pertinent. Macbeth, in league with the prince of lies, is to be tested by the sword which is truth. But of course the analogy is incomplete. The "worldly governour" defeats the Christian warrior, and denies the analogy by saying "swords I smile at, weapons laugh to scorn, / Brandish’d by man that's of a woman born" (V. vii. 12-13).

In this sense, the battle between Macbeth and Young Siward serves two purposes. Young Siward is offering himself as champion of Christian good against the forces of darkness, and for Macbeth, his triumph over the boy is proof of his (mistaken) belief that no human can kill him. Young Siward's Christian beliefs are echoed when his father hears of his death and is assured that his son has become "God’s soldier" because of his battle against evil. Although he falls in battle, Young Siward is praised for his bravery, and in falling at the hand of Macbeth he has finally achieved manhood (this is indicated when Ross informs Siward that his son "only liv'd but till he was a man").
