= Máel Coluim (son of the king of the Cumbrians) =

Possible King of Strathclyde or King of Alba

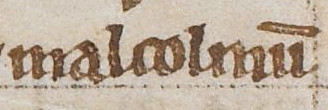
- Máel Coluim's name as it appears on folio 13v of British Library Cotton Faustina B IX (the Chronicle of Melrose): "Malcolmum".
- Father: possibly Owain Foel

Máel Coluim (fl. 1054) was an eleventh-century magnate who seems to have been established as either King of Alba or King of Strathclyde. In 1055, Siward, Earl of Northumbria defeated Mac Bethad mac Findlaích, the reigning ruler of the Kingdom of Alba. As a result of this military success against the Scots, several sources assert that Siward established Máel Coluim as king. It is uncertain whether this concerned the kingship of Alba or the kingship of Strathclyde.

The fact that Máel Coluim is described as the son of a "King of the Cumbrians" suggests that he was a member of the Cumbrian royal dynasty of Strathclyde, and could indicate that he was a close relative of Owain Foel, King of Strathclyde, the last known King of Strathclyde. Máel Coluim's Gaelic personal name could indicate that he was maternally descended from the royal Alpínid dynasty of Alba, which would have in turn endowed him with a claim to the Scottish throne.

Máel Coluim's fate is unknown. The fact that Siward died in 1055, and Mac Bethad retained authority in Alba, suggests that Máel Coluim was quickly overcome. There is evidence indicating that the southern reaches of the Kingdom of Strathclyde—the territories upon the Solway Plain—fell into the hands of the English during Siward's floruit. The more northerly lands of the realm seem to have been conquered by Máel Coluim mac Donnchada, King of Alba sometime between 1058 and 1070, and it is uncertain whether an independent Kingdom of Strathclyde still existed by the time of this conquest. In any event, Máel Coluim appears to be the last member of the Cumbrian royal dynasty on record.

== Background ==
Simplified pedigree of the Cumbrian royal dynasty. Máel Coluim is highlighted. It is possible that all these men ruled the Kingdom of Strathclyde.

Dyfnwal ab Owain (died 975)
Rhydderch (fl. 971)	Máel Coluim (died 997)	Owain (died 1015)
Owain Foel (fl. 1018)
Máel Coluim (fl. 1054)

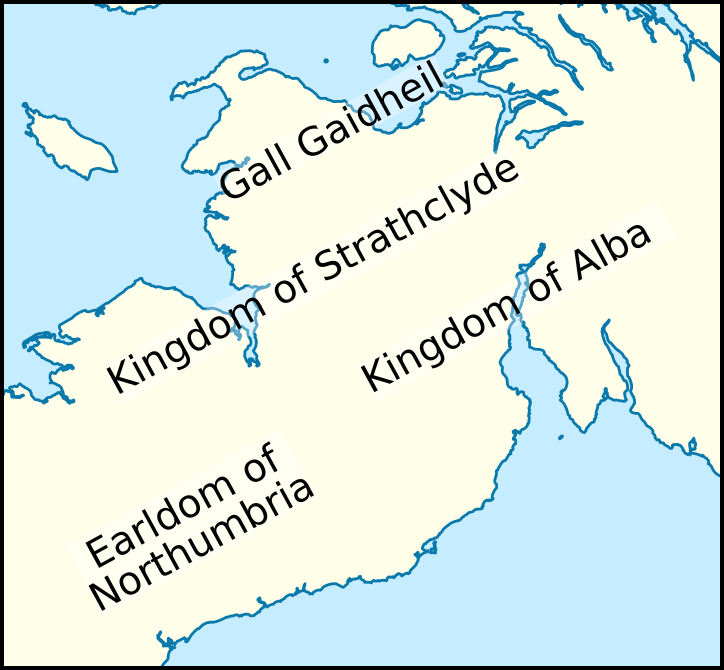
The Kingdom of Strathclyde in relation to its neighbours in the early eleventh century.

Máel Coluim seems to have been a member of the Cumbrian royal dynasty that ruled the Kingdom of Strathclyde. The twelfth-century Chronicon ex chronicis identifies him as a "son of the king of the Cumbrians" (regis Cumbrorum filium). He was likely closely related to—and possibly descended from—Owain Foel, King of Strathclyde, a monarch attested in 1018 assisting the Scots against the Northumbrians at the Battle of Carham. Not only is the fate of Owain Foel uncertain following this Scottish victory, so too is the fate of the Cumbrian kingdom.

== Son of the king of the Cumbrians ==
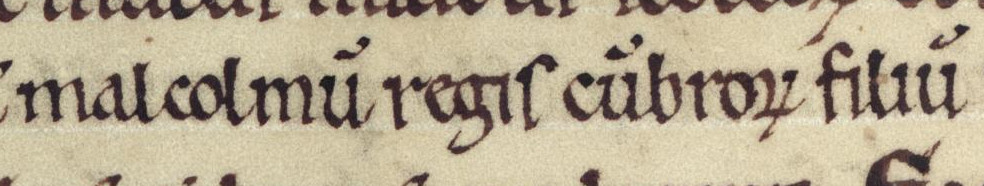
Máel Coluim's name and parentage as it appears on page 338 of Oxford Corpus Christi College 157 (Chronicon ex chronicis).

In 1054, the Kingdom of Alba was invaded by Siward, Earl of Northumbria in a campaign noted by the ninth- to twelfth-century Anglo-Saxon Chronicle. (Note: According to the "D" version of the Anglo-Saxon Chronicle, a son and a nephew of Siward were slain in the invasion. This source is partly corroborated by Historia Anglorum, which states that Siward sent a son to conquer Scotland, and that this son was slain there.) According to the twelfth-century Gesta regum Anglorum, and Chronicon ex chronicis, Siward set up Máel Coluim in opposition to Mac Bethad mac Findlaích, King of Alba. (Note: According to the thirteenth-century Gesta antecessorum comitis Waldevi, Siward supported the cause of a deposed king called "Duvenal".)

One possible interpretation of these sources is that this Máel Coluim refers to Mac Bethad's opponent Máel Coluim mac Donnchada, a man who reigned as King of Alba from 1058 to 1093. If correct, the episode would seem to be evidence that the latter's father, Donnchad ua Maíl Choluim—a man who had reigned as King of Alba from 1034 to 1040—had once been King of Strathclyde as well.

Against this hypothetical succession is the fact that it rests solely upon Chronicon ex chronicis and Gesta regum Anglorum. In fact, there is otherwise no evidence that Donnchad was ever a Cumbrian king. If Chronicon ex chronicis and Gesta regum Anglorum truly refer to Donnchad's son, it is unclear why these sources describe this man as aon of a mere Cumbrian king as opposed to that of a Scottish king—which Donnchad most certainly was—or why they fail to simply identify him as a son of Donnchad himself. In fact, there is otherwise no firm evidence that Máel Coluim mac Donnchada was in Alba or Northumbria in 1054, or that he had any connection with Siward's victory over Mac Bethad. Mac Bethad seems to have held onto the Scottish kingship until 1057, only to be succeeded by Lulach mac Gilla Comgáin. (Note: Gesta regum Anglorum erroneously claims that Siward slew Mac Bethad and installed Máel Coluim as king in his place. The twelfth-century Annales Lindisfarnenses et Dunelmenses, relates that Siward inserted a king in Mac Bethad's place before the latter was able to regain control.)

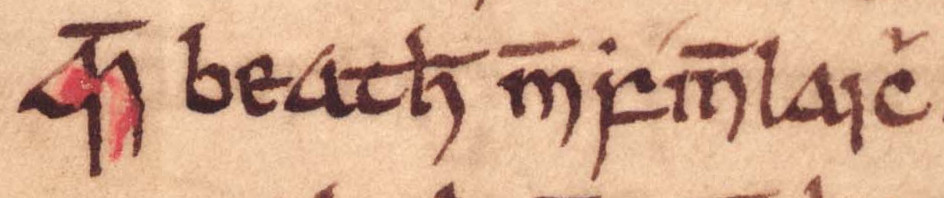
The name of Mac Bethad mac Findlaích as it appears on folio 41v of Oxford Bodleian Library Rawlinson B 489 (the Annals of Ulster).

In fact, the events of 1054 more likely refer to Máel Coluim. Rather than being a member of the royal Alpínid dynasty of Alba, Máel Coluim is more likely to have been a member of the Cumbrian royal family. He could have been a son, or grandson of Owain Foel himself. Certainly, a previous member of the family is known to have borne the same name. (Note: The Gaelic personal name Máel Coluim means "servant of St Columba". This name was earlier borne by Máel Coluim, King of Strathclyde, son of Dyfnwal ab Owain, King of Strathclyde. Both men could have been ancestors of Máel Coluim.) If Máel Coluim was indeed a member of this kindred, one possibility is that the Scots had deprived him of the Cumbrian kingship following Owain Foel's demise, and that Siward installed Máel Coluim as king over the Cumbrians following the English victory against Mac Bethad. Another possibility, suggested by the account of events given by both Chronicon ex chronicis and Gesta regum Anglorum, is that Siward installed Máel Coluim as King of Alba. Certainly, Máel Coluim's name could be evidence of an ancestral link with the ruling Alpínids—perhaps even a matrilineal link to Owain Foel's confederate at Carham, Máel Coluim mac Cináeda, King of Alba. If Máel Coluim was indeed a maternal grandson of a Scottish king, he would have certainly possessed a claim to the Scottish throne. Although nothing is known of Máel Coluim's possible reign in Alba, there is reason to suspect that he would have probably functioned as an English puppet, with little support from the Scottish aristocracy.

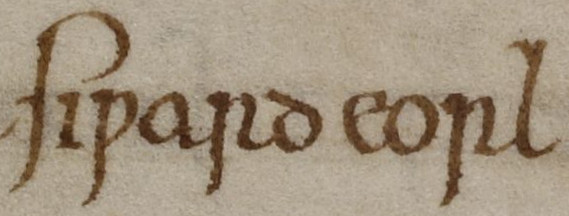
The name and title of Siward as it appears on folio 161v of British Library Cotton Tiberius B I (the "C" version of the Anglo-Saxon Chronicle): "Siward eorl".

Although the accounts of 1054 given by both Chronicon ex chronicis and Gesta regum Anglorum can be interpreted as entries about events concerning Máel Coluim, there is a possibility that the compilers of these sources mistakenly assumed that they were actually referring to Máel Coluim mac Donnchada, since the latter's son, David, possessed Cumbria as a principality in the early twelfth century. Nevertheless, there is evidence indicating that the composer of Gesta regum Anglorum was aware that Máel Coluim was not identical to his Scottish namesake. For instance, this source clearly differentiates between the Scottish and Cumbrian kings that assembled with their English counterpart at Chester in 973. The monks of Melrose Abbey, who compiled the twelfth- to thirteenth-century Chronicle of Melrose, also seem to have been aware of Cumbria's geopolitical history, as evinced by the recognisance of the Cumbrian kingdom by the twelfth-century Vita sancti Kentegerni, a work commissioned by Jocelin, Abbot of Melrose.

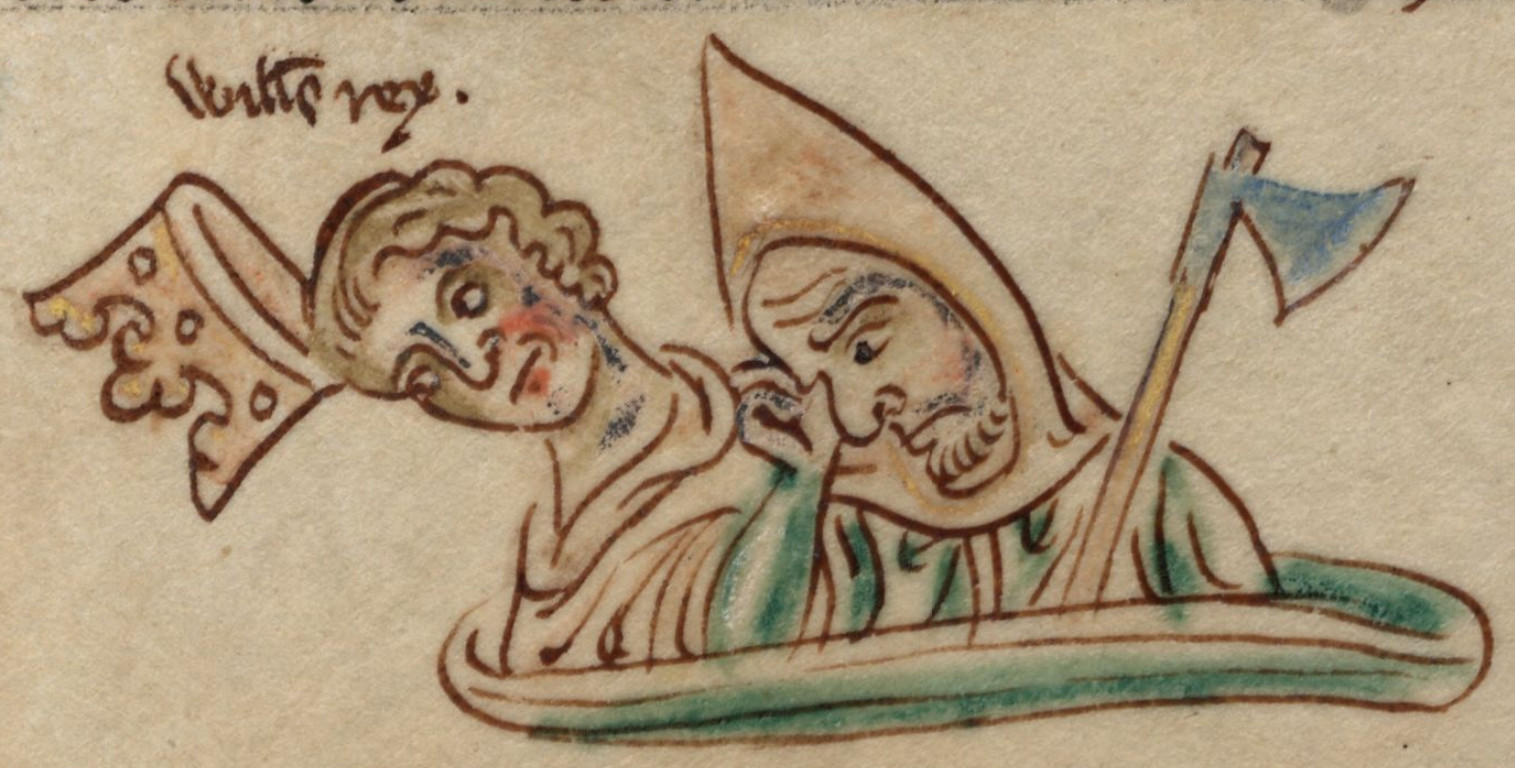
A thirteenth-century depiction of the capture of William I, King of Scotland in 1174, as it appears on folio 134r of Cambridge Corpus Christi College 26 (Chronica majora). The dramatic aftereffects of this king's capture may have had repercussions upon Máel Coluim's portrayal in mediaeval sources.

The first phase in the composition of the Chronicle of Melrose dates to 1173×1174. It was at this point that the chronicle's account of Siward's invasion was compiled from the twelfth-century Historia regum Anglorum. Since the latter source observes that Máel Coluim mac Donnchada unlawfully held Cumbria by force in 1070, the Melrose scribe appears to have been aware that this king was not identical to the Cumbrian Máel Coluim. This may in turn explain why the scribe did not copy over the clause "son of the king of the Cumbrians" from Historia regum Anglorum. The Chronicle of Melrose may therefore be the earliest source to explicitly associate Máel Coluim mac Donnchada with the events of 1054. As a result of this identification, this Scottish monarch was portrayed as a man who only possessed his throne on account of English assistance.

The catalyst behind the monks' misrepresentation of Siward's invasion appears to have been an English revolt dating to 1173 and 1174, when the reigning King of Scotland—a great-grandson of Máel Coluim mac Donnchada—backed a failed rebellion against the King of England. As a result of this Scottish monarch's capture in the course of the uprising, English lordship over Scotland was conceded by the Scots, with conclusion of the Treaty of Falaise in 1174. The conditions imposed upon the Scots date to the very time the scribe compiled his account of 1054, and it is possible these concessions inspired the Melrose monks to concoct an eleventh-century royal precedent for twelfth-century Scottish subservience. (Note: Later, in the thirteenth century, probably in 1246×1259, another scribe modified the Chronicle of Melrose in an apparent attempt to salvage Máel Coluim mac Donnchada's legitimacy to the throne. Although the scribe did not amend the chronicle's skewed account of Siward's 1054 campaign, he made several changes in the earlier and latter passages. For instance, the scribe tweaked the 1039 entry concerning Donnchad's death, to label Mac Bethad's succession as a usurpation; he amended the 1055 notice of Lulach's reign to limit it to specifically four and a half months; and he added the statement that Máel Coluim mac Donnchada received the kingship in 1056 because of his "hereditary right". As a result of these thirteenth-century alterations, the Chronicle of Melrose portrayed the latter as a legitimate Scottish sovereign who had no need for English intervention.)

== Disintegration of the Cumbrian realm ==
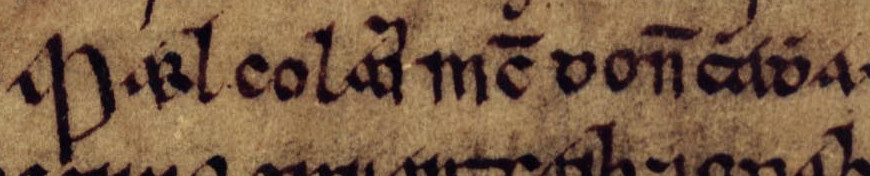
The name of Máel Coluim mac Donnchada as it appears on folio 19v of Oxford Bodleian Library Rawlinson B 488 (the Annals of Tigernach): "Mael Colaim mac Donnchadha".

It is uncertain if the Kingdom of Strathclyde even existed by the time of the events of 1054. There is evidence to suggest that Siward and the Northumbrians exerted a significant amount of influence over the Cumbrian realm by the mid eleventh century. For example, the twelfth-century Historia ecclesiae Eboracensis records that two Bishops of Glasgow—a certain Johannes and Magsuen, whose names could be evidence that they were Cumbrians—were consecrated by Cynesige, Archbishop of York. Although it is uncertain if Glasgow was indeed a diocesan seat in the eleventh century, the fact that an eleventh-century stone cross, decorated in the Northumbrian style, has been recovered from the site of the Glasgow Cathedral, suggests that this site was increasing in importance before the construction of the cathedral in the twelfth century. This cross may, therefore, corroborate the consecrational claims of Historia ecclesiae Eboracensis, which could in turn indicate that Siward and (the senior Northumbrian cleric) Cynesige were indeed exerting influence over the Cumbrians. (Note: Although Historia ecclesiae Eboracensis describes Johannes and Magsuen as bishops of Glasgow, it is possible that this is an anachronism for "bishop of Cumbria". If the Cumbrian ecclesiastical centre was not located at Glasgow, it could have been seated at Govan or some place else.) Another piece of evidence for Northumbrian expansion is a particular eleventh-century charter detailing the grant of certain rights and lands from a certain Gospatric to several individuals. According to this contract, the grantees received various lands in what came to form the English county of Cumberland, and they also gained a guarantee of protection from Gospatric and Siward. (Note: The contract is sometimes called "Gospatric's writ", "Gospatrick's Writ", or "Gospatrick's Writ". It survives in a thirteenth-century copy of the original. The remarkably varied personal names and terminology recorded throughout the document (those with Cumbrian, Scandinavian, Gaelic, and English elements) partly exemplifies the hybrid culture of the region.) The likelihood that Siward would have only granted territories within his own sphere of influence, coupled with the fact that the charter specifically states that the granted lands were "once Cumbrian", suggests that most (if not all) of the Cumbrian territories south of the Solway Firth had been gained by Siward sometimes before his death in 1055.

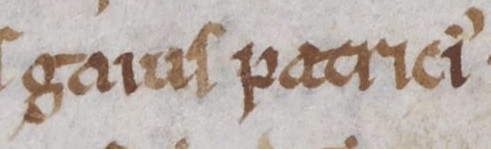
The name of Gospatric, Earl of Northumbria as it appears on folio 46v of British Library Harley 526 (Vita Ædwardi Regis).

It may have been in the course of Siward's campaign against the Scots that the English gained control of the Solway Plain. Pressure from external forces north of the Solway Firth—such as the contemporaneous expansion of the Gall Gaidheil—could have meant that the Cumbrian leadership allowed the southerly territories fall under Siward's authority. Whilst these lands indeed seem to have fallen under English authority in the eleventh century, the more northerly Cumbrian territories appear to have been conquered by the Scots. In 1070, for example, Gospatric, Earl of Northumbria is recorded to have led an invasion into Scottish-controlled territory in an effort to counter certain devastating Scottish raids into England. According to Historia regum Anglorum, Gospatric directed his counter-strike into Cumbreland, the former lands of the Cumbrian realm. In fact, this source alleges that Máel Coluim mac Donnchada's royal authority in these lands was unlawful since the Scots had only seized the lands "through violent subjugation".

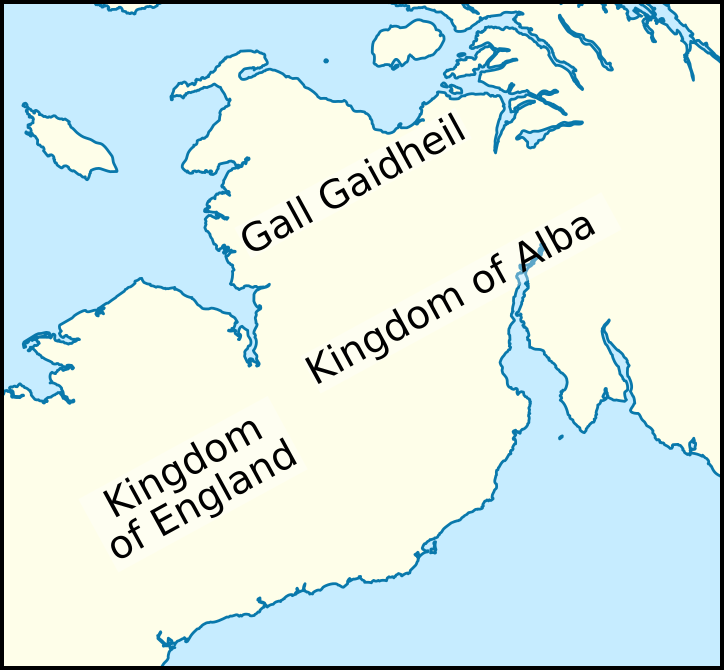
The political alignment in the wake of the demise of the Kingdom of Strathclyde in the eleventh century.

Whilst the record of bishops Johannes and Magsuen seems to reveal that the Cumbrians were independent of the Scots during Cynesige's episcopacy (1055–1060)—albeit possibly under Northumbrian domination—the evidence from Historia regum Anglorum reveals that the northernmost portion of the Cumbrian realm had fallen to the Scots by the time of Gospatric's invasion. Although the events noted by Historia regum Anglorum are corroborated by the twelfth century Historia post Bedam, the Scottish conquest is unrecorded. Nevertheless, the takeover seems to have occurred at some point between Máel Coluim mac Donnchada's accession in 1058 and Gospatric's invasion of 1070. One possibility is that the Scots overthrew the father of the Cumbrian Máel Coluim. Another is that Máel Coluim and his dynasty were overcome in the power vacuum left by Siward's demise in 1055. The fact that Historia regum Anglorum questions the legitimacy of Máel Coluim mac Donnchada's possession of Cumbreland could reveal that the compiler of this source regarded the region as rightfully Northumbrian. In any case, Máel Coluim appears to be the last known member of the Cumbrian dynasty.

== See also ==
- David, Prince of the Cumbrians, a twelfth-century magnate who bore the titles "prince of the Cumbrians" and "prince of the Cumbrian region", according him quasi-regal status over territories that formerly comprised the Kingdom of Strathclyde.
