= Milo Edwards =

British stand-up comedian

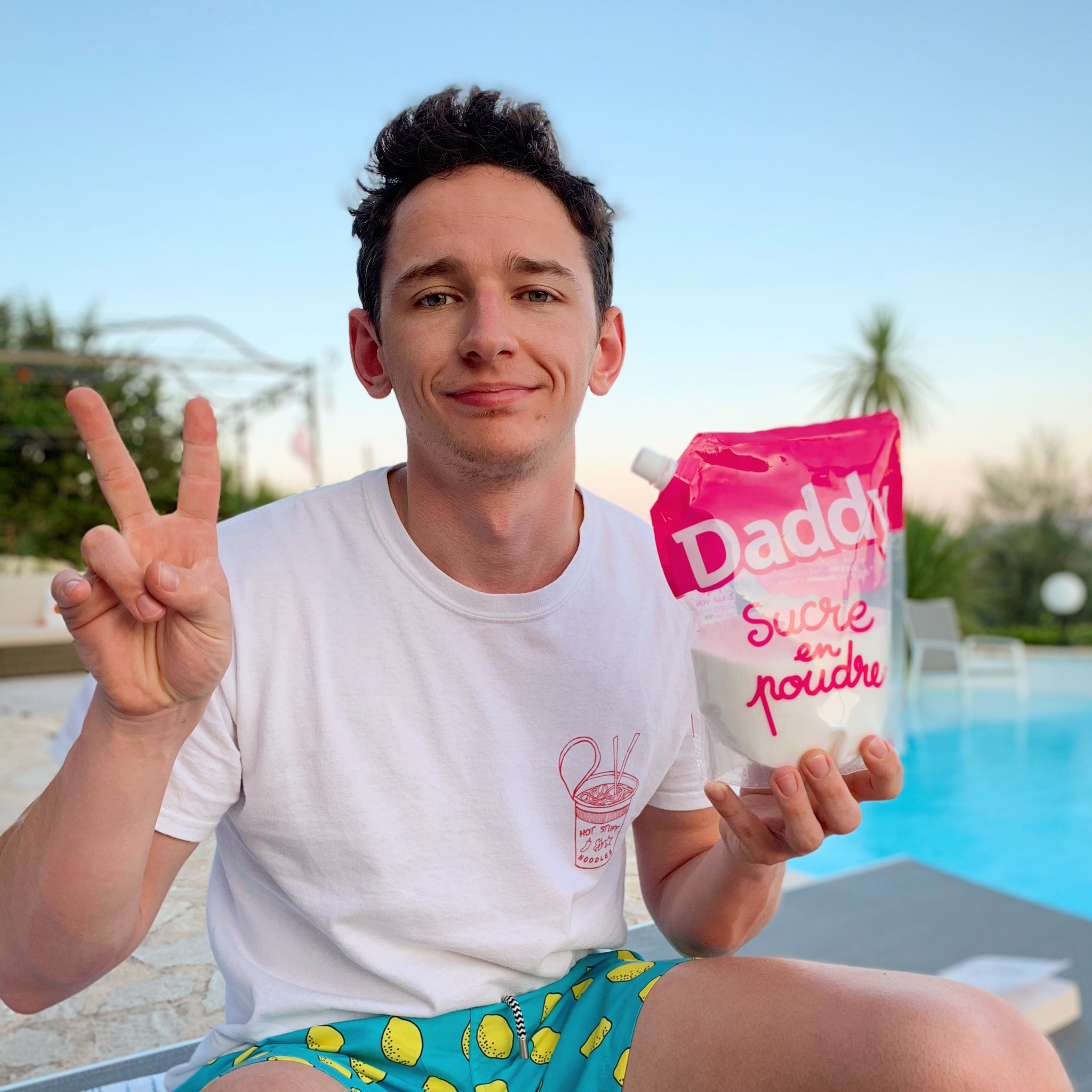
- Born: Milo Leonard Edwards; February 1993 (age 33); Harlow, England
- Education: Peterhouse, Cambridge

Comedy career
- Medium: stand-up, podcasting, writing
- Website: miloedwards.co.uk

Milo Leonard Edwards (born February 1993) is an English comedian, podcaster and writer. He co-hosts the podcasts Trashfuture, Masters of Our Domain, Toomuch (Тумач), and Glue Factory. He has performed comedy in both English and Russian, including on the shows Open Microphone and StandUp. He has been a comedy writer for Late Night Mash, Mock the Week, Hello America, Breaking The News and The News Quiz and has written for Private Eye and The New Statesman. He has been described by Chortle as ‘one of the UK’s smartest, most vital stand-ups'.

== Early life ==
Edwards is from Harlow, Essex. He attended Hills Road Sixth Form College in Cambridge before going on to study Classics at Peterhouse, Cambridge.

== Career ==
=== Stand-up comedy ===
Edwards was a member of the Footlights at the University of Cambridge. In 2015 he moved to Russia where he performed on Open Microphone (Открытый Микрофон) and StandUp on the Russian TV channel TNT Television (ТНТ). While Edwards says in his comedy that he enjoyed his time in Russia and found Moscow "really rather nice," he found Russia an "impossible country" to live in and understood very quickly that his stay was going to be "much shorter than [he'd] initially thought." In 2018 he moved back to the UK and in 2019 performed his show Pindos at Edinburgh Fringe about his time working as a comedian in Russia. In 2022, he returned to the Edinburgh Fringe with his show Voicemail which was released as a special on YouTube in July 2024. In 2023 Edwards brought his new show ‘Sentimental’ to the Fringe which was described as ‘one of the best hours so far this year’. Sentimental also appeared on The Telegraph’s best jokes of the Fringe list in 2023. In 2024 Edwards Edinburgh Fringe show ‘How Revolting! Sorry to Offend’ was featured in The Telegraph’s best jokes of the Fringe 2024. He has been described by Chortle as ‘one of the UK’s smartest, most vital stand-ups.

=== Podcasting ===
Edwards is a cohost of TrashFuture, "a podcast about business success and making yourself smarter with the continued psychic trauma of capitalism", with Hussein Kesvani, November Kelly, Nate Bethea and Riley Quinn. He also cohosts with Phoebe Roy Masters of our Domain, a podcast about Seinfeld, as well as the podcast Glue Factory. He previously hosted the Russian language comedy podcast Toomuch (Тумач) which has now finished.

=== Writing ===
Edwards has been a comedy writer for Late Night Mash, Mock The Week, Hello America, Breaking The News and The News Quiz. He has written for Private Eye and The New Statesman.

=== Awards ===
Edwards won the award for Best Poster at the Edinburgh Fringe in 2022 and his show Voicemail was nominated for Best Show at Leicester Comedy Festival in 2023. His show Sentimental was nominated for NextUp’s 'Biggest Award in Comedy' and was long-listed for Best Show at the Edinburgh(Ish) Comedy Awards at the Fringe in 2023 and was shortlisted for Best Show at Leicester Comedy Festival 2024.
