= Alcuin College, York =

College of the University of York, England

Coordinates: 53.94927°N 1.04898°W

Alcuin College
- University of York
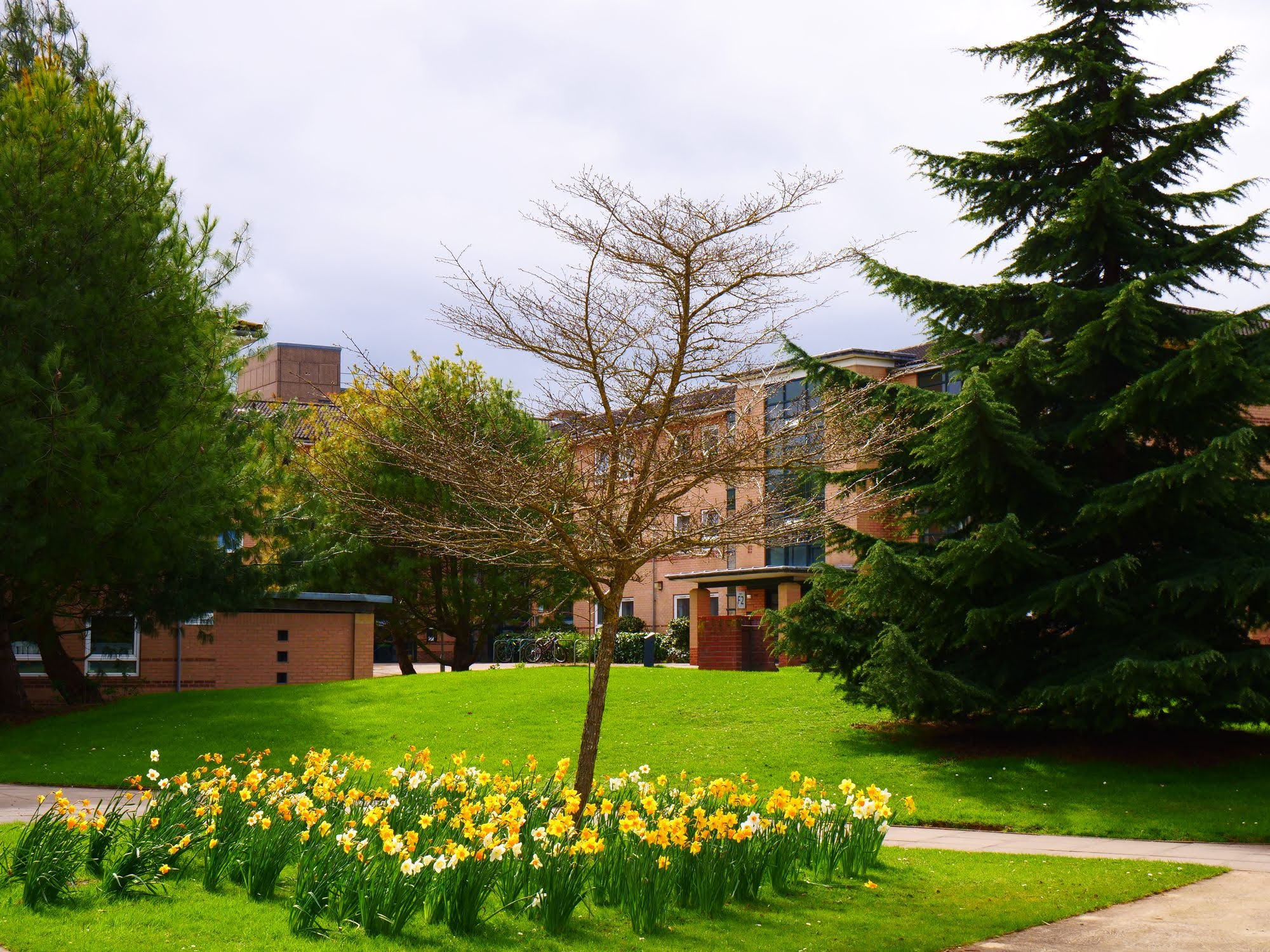
- Quad with accommodation blocks, Alcuin College
- Location: Siward's Howe, Heslington West, York
- Motto: Latin: Panto Nos Postulo
- Motto in English: "All we need"
- Established: 1967
- Named for: Alcuin of York
- Deputy College Manager: Esther Smyth
- Undergraduates: 1,585 (2022/2023)
- Postgraduates: 375 (2022/2023)
- Mascot: Owlcuin
- Website: Alcuin College
- Student association: Alcuin College Student Association

Alcuin College is a college of the University of York located on Siward's Howe, York, England. It is one of eleven colleges of the university, being the nearest to the library on the Heslington West campus.

== History ==
Alcuin was one of the University of York's first colleges, established in 1967 alongside Vanbrugh College. It was officially opened in 1969 by Kenneth Clark, the chancellor of the university.

It is located on Siward's Howe, making it the highest elevated college in the university. It is also believed to be the burial site of Eric Bloodaxe, who was King of Northumbria and of Norway.

=== Separatist movement ===
From the early days of the college an uproar for secession of the college from the remainder of the university has been present.

== Buildings and services ==
For many years, Alcuin was the only college physically separated from the others except for a bridge from the library, a narrow bridge from Langwith (demolished over Easter 2008) and a walkway to the chemistry department. Overlooking University Road was Alcuin's bar. In 1995 this was transformed from a traditional British pub-style bar to a 1950s American theme bar – the only themed college bar on campus. The bar was decorated in American 1950s paraphernalia such as busts of Marilyn Monroe and a full-size pink cadillac that appeared to be crashing through the wall. In the 21st century, the bar was renamed "B Henry's", after Brian Henry, a college porter of many years who had recently retired. In 2008, a move by commercial services to close B Henry's triggered a large campaign to save the bar. The campaign was unsuccessful.

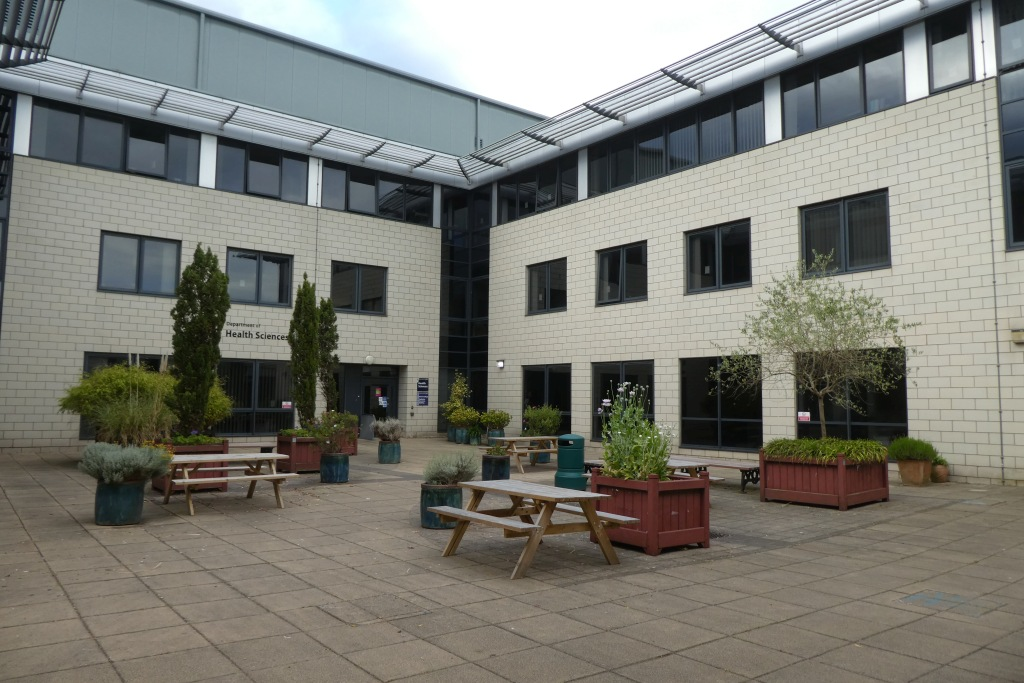
The Seebohm Rowntree Building

In 2013, the student union took over the running of the outlet and named it "The Kitchen at Alcuin". Events such as YUSU's Keep Cool at exam time campaign, the Alcuin 50th anniversary and Envirocuin have seen the Kitchen at Alcuin being used as a more general venue for activities outside of normal opening hours.

Alcuin is perhaps best known for the ensuite bathrooms that come as standard with every room and the general quality of the rooms, most of which were recently built. It currently does not possess a bar, but has two food venues, the Alcuin Bistro and the Kitchen at Alcuin café. The college accommodation is divided into blocks; E, F1, F2, G, H, J1, J2, K, L, M, N, P and Q. There are also several teaching blocks (East Wing and the Seebohm Rowntree building) and is home of several departments including economics and chemistry, as well as the university library.

A new JCR building was opened in May 2006. The Seebohm Rowntree Building was added in 2002, and contains teaching facilities.

== Student life ==
Like the other York colleges, Alcuin has its own student association known as the College Student Association Committee (CSAC). The association takes on the responsibility of the day-to-day running of the college activities and is responsible for supporting students, providing social, sporting and cultural activities and developing the college community.

The CSAC hosts regular pub quizzes at The Courtyard, the local campus bar. Alcuin has introduced Alcuin Live Lounge where current and ex-students of the college attend the Kitchen at Alcuin for a chilled night of live music given by students and members of the community. Alcuin hosts a yearly winter ball, which is the most heavily attended college event of the year.

Furthermore, Alcuin is notable for its wellbeing events such as "Exam Refuge" in which the CSAC provide free food and a relaxed environment to Alcuinites during the exam period. Alcuin is also known for hosting the "Nuzzlets" where a variety of animals are brought in for students to pet.

== Notable people ==
Notable alumni include:

- Peter Hitchens, author and journalist (Philosophy and Politics, 1973)
- Aníbal Cavaco Silva, former President and Prime Minister of Portugal (Doctorate in Economics, 1973)
- John Witherow, newspaper editor (History, 1975)
- Steve Richards, television presenter and journalist: (History, 1981)
- Bryan Elsley, television writer (English and history, 1982)
- Duncan Stubbs, musician (Music, 1982)
- Paul Mealor, composer (Music, 1997)
- Hector Janse van Rensburg, artist
- Mark Laity, NATO spokesman and former BBC correspondent
