= St Olave's Church, York =

Church of England Church in York, England

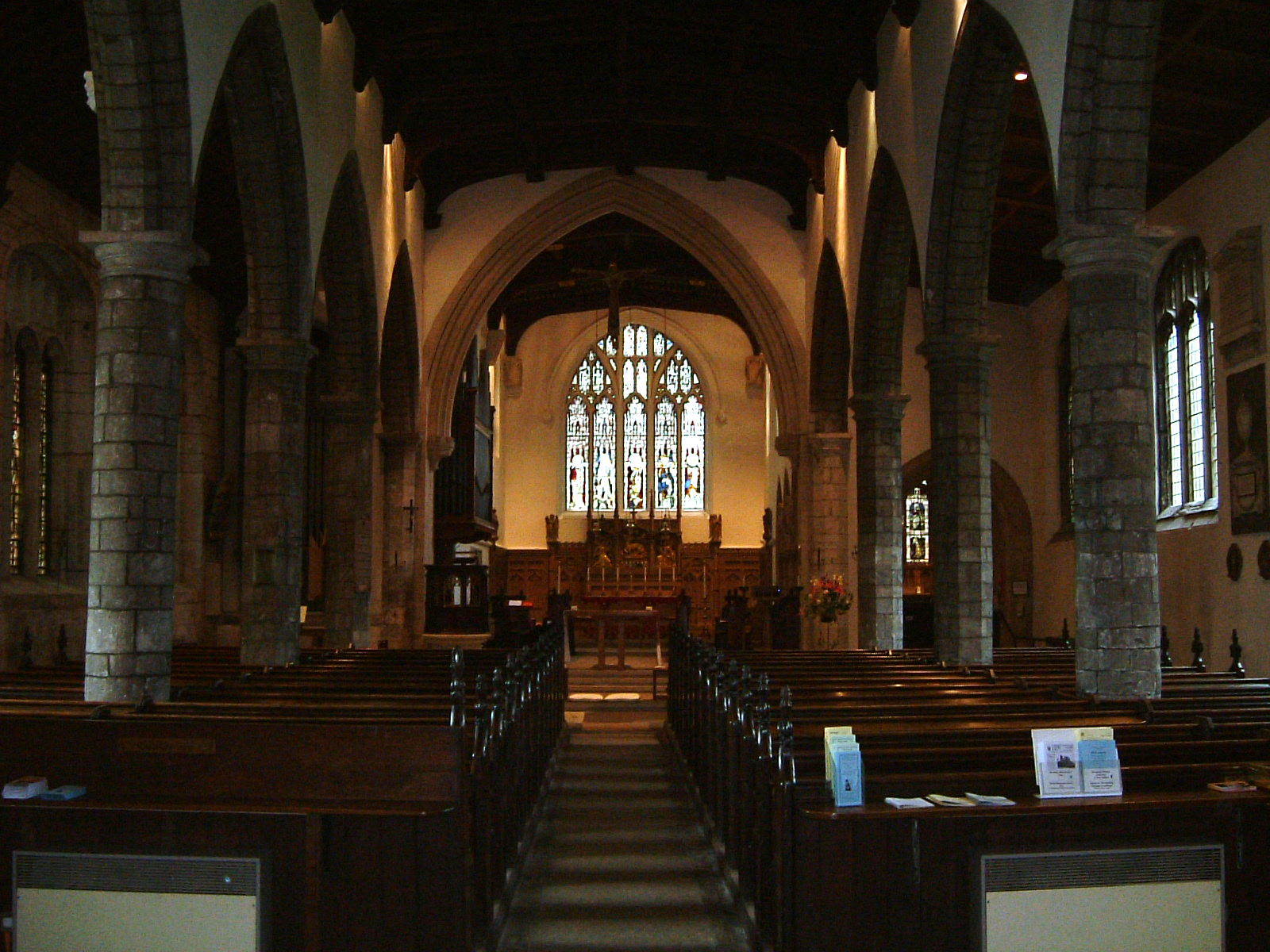
- The interior of St Olave's church, facing east
- St Olave's Church, York
- 53°57′44.3″N 1°5′20.6″W
- OS grid reference: SE 5986 5219
- Location: York
- Country: England
- Denomination: Church of England
- Churchmanship: Liberal Anglo-Catholic
- Website: stolaveschurch.org.uk

History
- Dedication: St Olaf
- Consecrated: c. 1050

Architecture
- Heritage designation: Grade I listed

Administration
- Province: Province of York
- Diocese: Diocese of York
- Archdeaconry: York
- Deanery: York
- Parish: St Olave with St Giles, York

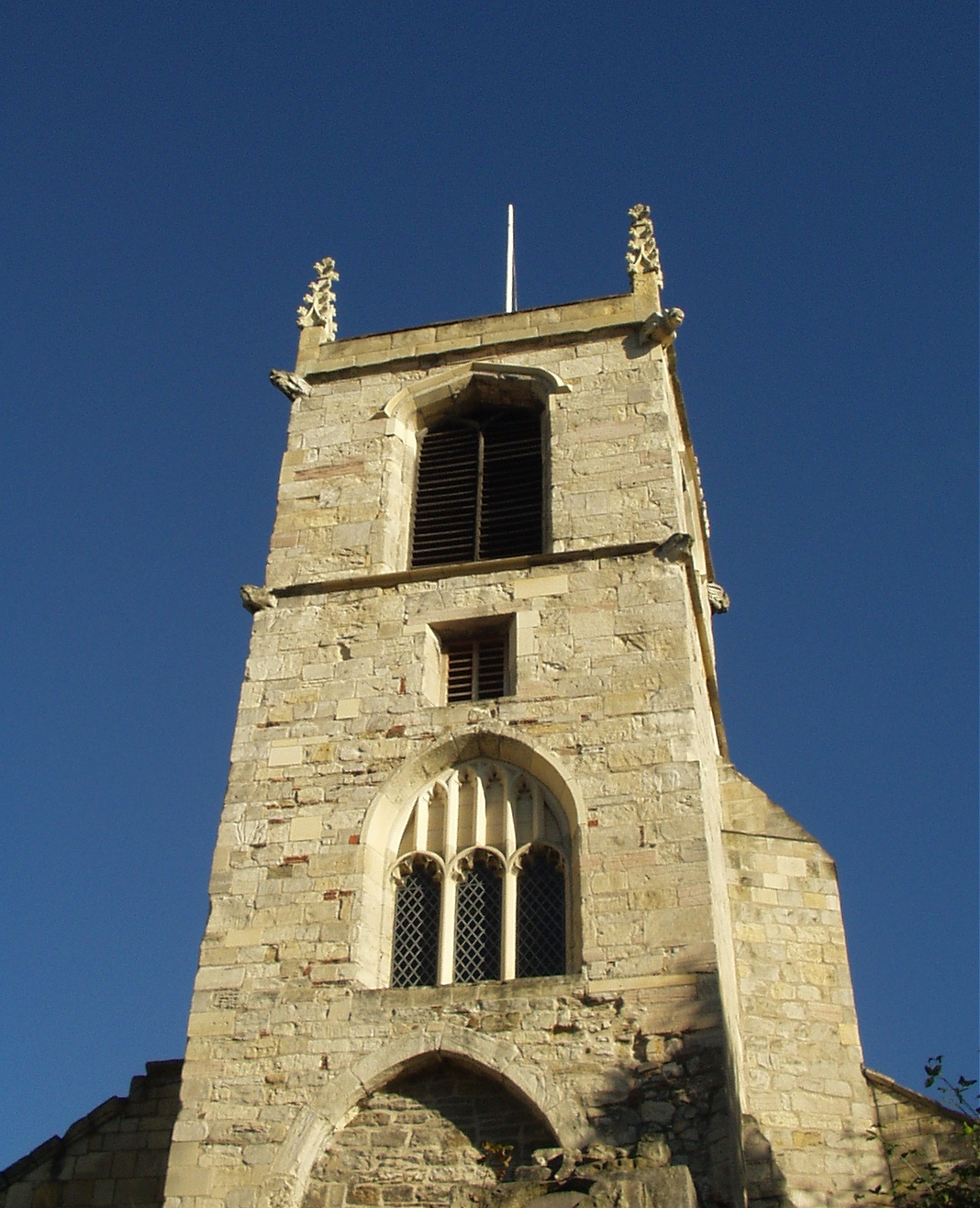
St Olave's Church, York

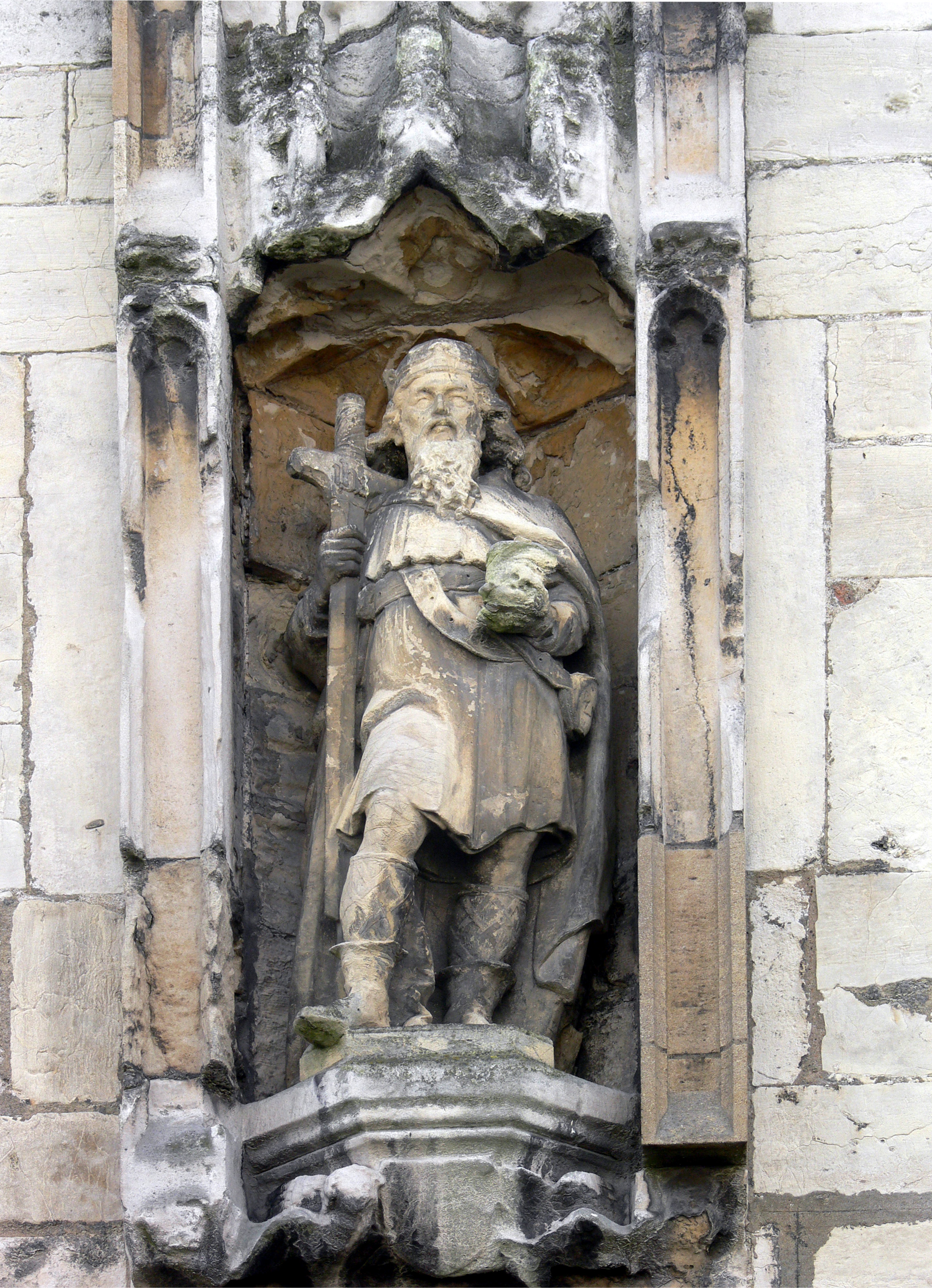
Statue of St Olave

St Olave's Church, York (pronounced Olive) is a Grade I listed parish church of the Church of England in York. It stands on Marygate, by St Mary's Abbey.

== History ==
St Olave's Church is situated within St Mary's Abbey walls, which was ruined in the Dissolution of the Monasteries. It is dedicated to St Olaf, patron saint of Norway. The Anglo-Saxon Chronicle entry for 1055 records that "This year died Earl Siward at York; and his body lies in the minster at Galmanho, which he had himself ordered to be built and consecrated, in the name of God and St. Olave, to the honour of God and to all his saints".

Galmanho is a former name for the area where the church stands and Siward, Earl of Northumbria, is believed to have had his York residence. This is the earliest date for a church dedication to St Olaf (Olav in Norwegian) anywhere.

St Olave's Church was extensively rebuilt in the 15th century. Substantial repairs were carried out in the 1720s including the insertion of windows in the north aisle, the wall of which had earlier served as part of the abbey and later city defences. The church was restored in 1848–49, and reopened on 14 February 1849.

The church was again renovated starting in 1887. After a closure of five weeks, the church reopened on 2 September 1888. The ceiling of lath and plaster which covered the central aisle of the nave was removed. The pillars, arches and north and west walls were stripped of paint and plaster. A new chancel was added between 1887 and 1889 by George Fowler Jones, a York architect, and later extended in 1906. This contains the five-light 15th-century east window. Despite these changes the architectural style is broadly 15th century.

== Current parish life ==
St Olave's has a strong musical tradition, with a large choir and recently restored organ, as well as a ring of six bells hung for change ringing. In addition the orchestra of the Academy of St Olave's performs three concerts each year and plays for one orchestral Mass on Remembrance Sunday. The Sunday Sung Eucharist is at 10.30 using Common Worship (order one, contemporary language). The parish lies within the Liberal Anglo-Catholic tradition of the Church of England, with vestments and incense used at every celebration of the Sung Eucharist.

== Incumbents ==
Initially referred to as Chaplains, the post was Curate from 1499, and Vicar from 1663.

- 1389 Thomas
- 1390 John Kilburn
- 1300 William de Malton
- 1432 Thomas Proktoure
- 1433 Thomas Wright
- 1437 Robert
- 1438 William Kirkeby
- 1445 William Hardy
- 1445 John Litster
- 1458 Thomas Dobson
- 1463 Thomas Eston
- 1471 John Rudby
- 1489 Gilbert Baxter
- 1496 Robert Lelegrave
- 1499 William Philipson
- 1522 John Sissotson
- 1530 Richard Wilkinson
- 1550 Wilfrid Archer
- 1571 Robert Sayer
- 1573 Thomas Bowes
- 1608 Michael Vascoe
- 1610 Henry Brinckwell
- 1619 Henry Moore
- 1620 John Philliskirk
- 1634 John Belwood
- 1663 Thomas Tonge
- 1673 Walter Blakestone
- 1679 John Wild
- 1695 Thomas Moseley
- 1733 William Dodsworth
- 1754 William Ellis
- 1771 William Dade
- 1790 Ralph Worsley
- 1848 William Strong
- 1855 Frederick Bartlett
- 1877 William Hey
- 1883 William Croser Hey
- 1892 William Dodsworth
- 1905 Charles Bell
- 1915 Alfred Glover
- 1928 Walter Hollis
- 1932 Francis Windley
- 1946 Eric Denyer
- 1962 William Griffith
- 1970 Clifford Barker
- 1976 James Alan Heslop
- 1988 Anthony Hodge

== Memorials ==
- George Hutchinson (d. 1775)
- Michael Loftus (d. 1762)
- William Etty (d. 1849)

== Burials ==
- Siward, Earl of Northumbria

== Organ ==
The pipe organ was built by J. W. Walker & Sons Ltd and dates from 1907. A specification of the organ can be found on the National Pipe Organ Register.

== See also ==
- Grade I listed buildings in the City of York
- Listed buildings in York (outside the city walls, northern part)
