= Academy of St Olave's =

Academy of St Olave's (ASO)
- Chamber orchestra
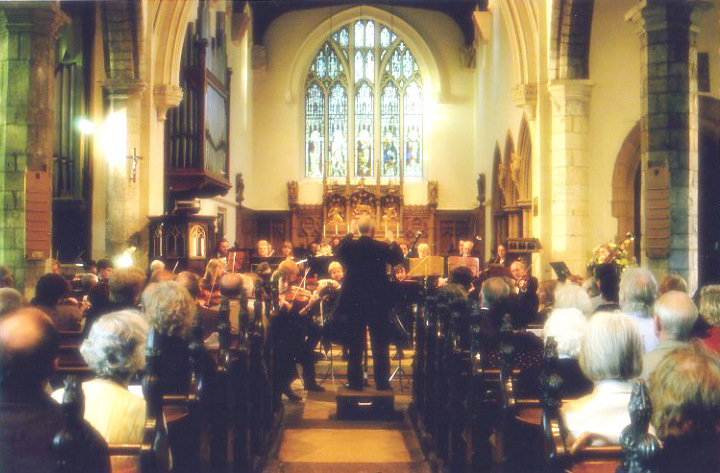
- Concert in York in June 2007
- Founded: 1978
- Location: York, England
- Concert hall: St Olave's Church, York
- Principal conductor: Alan George
- Website: www.academyofstolaves.org.uk

The Academy of St Olave's is an English chamber orchestra that plays in the beautiful setting of St Olave's Church, York, England.

The academy performs three concerts each year. Players are invited from a large pool of instrumentalists, according to the forces required. The orchestra's repertoire ranges from music of the seventeenth century to that of the present day; from Corelli and Purcell through Haydn, Mozart and Beethoven to Stravinsky, Britten and John Tavener. Members also play for occasional church services at St Olave's. For many years members of the orchestra have taken part in the requiem service for Remembrance Sunday (Fauré, Duruflé and Mozart in recent years).

The academy was founded in 1978 by Charles Macdonald, organist and director of music at St. Olave's Church, in conjunction with local headmaster-violinist, Robin Gilbert. The reason was to raise money for essential work to be done on the very fine organ at the church. The first concert was given on 8 January 1978 and was preceded by an article in the York newspaper, The Press.

By the time funds had been raised the Academy of St Olave's was sufficiently well established in the musical calendar of York for it to continue to give concerts. After Charles Macdonald moved from York in the early 1980s his successor, Chris Liddle continued with the orchestra, occasionally adding wind players as and when needed, a practice which further developed when Andrew Wright became musical director. By the time John Hastie was appointed musical director in 1997, the academy had become a chamber orchestra, and it adopted the policy of playing for the Solemn Requiem Mass on Remembrance Sunday at St Olave's Church, offering the Requiem settings by Gabriel Fauré and Maurice Duruflé on alternate years. The current director of the academy is the celebrated Fitzwilliam Quartet viola player, Alan George.

The Academy of St Olave's orchestra does not rehearse on a weekly basis; rehearsals are scheduled over a 2-week period prior to each concert. Players are invited from a large pool of instrumentalists, according to the forces required.

Players in the academy come from a wide range of backgrounds including teachers, gifted amateurs, students, talented school children and professional players. The minimum standard is Grade VIII and players are expected to have a high level of commitment and enthusiasm.
