= Hills Road Sixth Form College =

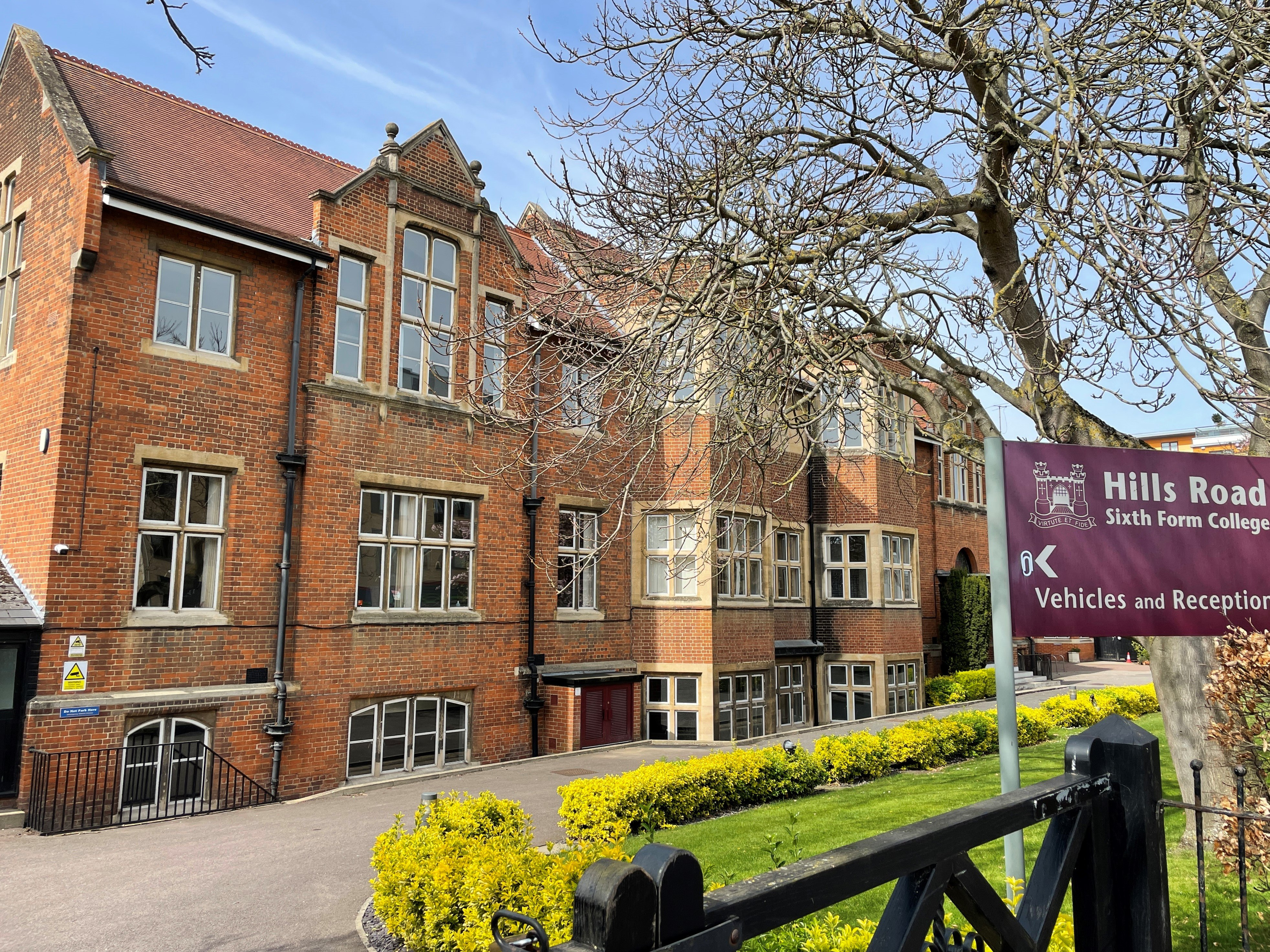

Location
- Hills Road; Cambridge, England, CB2 8PE; 52.188151°N 0.135297°E

Information
- School type: Sixth form college
- Motto: Latin: Virtute et fide By virtue and faith
- Established: 1974
- Department for Education URN: 130615 Tables
- Ofsted: Reports
- Principal: Jo Trump
- Teaching staff: 135
- Gender: Mixed
- Average class size: 22
- Language: English
- Colours: Maroon and sky blue
- Newspaper: The Phoenix
- Website: www.hillsroad.ac.uk

Hills Road Sixth Form College is a co-educational state sixth form college in Cambridge, England providing full-time A-level courses for approximately 2400 sixth form students from the surrounding area and a variety of courses to around 4,000 part-time students of all ages in the adult education programme, held as daytime and evening classes.

== History ==
Hills Road Sixth Form College was established on 15 September 1974 on the site of the former Cambridgeshire High School for Boys. It was founded as part of the transition to a comprehensive education system in Cambridgeshire, which replaced grammar schools and secondary moderns with a structure based on 11–16 comprehensive schools and sixth form colleges.

Since its foundation, the college has expanded its campus with a number of new facilities. The Sports and Tennis Centre opened in 1995. The Colin Greenhalgh Building, which houses English, modern languages, and history, was added soon after. In 2004, the Rob Wilkinson Building was developed to accommodate the physics, chemistry, and computer science departments. The following year, the Margaret Ingram Guidance Centre was opened to provide specialist tutorial space. The Linda Sinclair Building, opened in 2016, houses the mathematics and physical education departments. In 2023, the Study Centre was opened, offering additional student study areas and a rooftop staff facility.

In the early 1990s, responsibility for further education was transferred from local authorities to central government. Hills Road began receiving direct public funding.

== Notable former students ==
- Alison Balsom – trumpeter signed with EMI Classics
- Anthony Browne - Mayor of Cambridgeshire and Peterborough, Member of Parliament for South Cambridgeshire 2019-2024
- Catherine Banner – author
- Cavetown – singer, songwriter, musician, and YouTuber
- Benedict Cork – singer, songwriter, musician
- Sir Steven Cowley - physicist, international authority on fusion energy. He attended Cambridgeshire High School for Boys and Hills Road Sixth Form College in the 1970s, and won a scholarship to read physics at Corpus Christi College, Oxford, in 1977.
- Milo Edwards – comedian, writer, and podcaster
- Michael Heaver - broadcaster, former MEP and former chief press adviser to Nigel Farage
- Alice Hewkin – actress
- Tom Hunt - Member of Parliament for Ipswich 2019-2024
- Hector Janse van Rensburg – watercolour painter, also known as Shitty Watercolour
- Katie Rowley Jones – West End actress
- Tim Key – comedian and poet
- Sir Dave Lewis – former Tesco CEO
- Nemone Metaxas – radio DJ
- Lucy Parker - professional footballer for Aston Villa W.F.C. and England women's national football team
- Mark Pettini, Essex County cricketer (and former captain). Former member of England Under-19 team
- Surie – Singer, representing the United Kingdom in the 2018 Eurovision Song Contest with the song "Storm"
- Ben Thapa – member of male singing quartet G4
- Tom Westley, Essex County England Test cricketer and captain of England Under-19 at the 2008 Under-19 Cricket World Cup
- Lydia White – actress and singer

== Results and reputation ==
In January 2014 Hills Road was named the "creme de la creme" of state schools by Tatler Magazine, and included in Tatler's list of thirty elite state school in the United Kingdom. The 2009 Alps Report placed the College third in the sixth form college performance table and in the top 1% for all institutions. According to the 2009 edition of the BBC's English school tables, the school's student have performed above average in A-Level examinations.

By 2019 the college had achieved an Ofsted rating of 'Outstanding' from its first inspection in 2001.
