= Hector Janse van Rensburg =

British painter (born 1993)

Shitty Watercolour
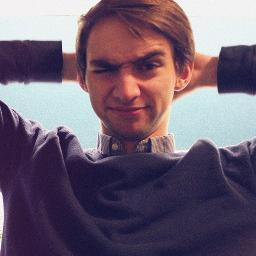
- Born: Hector Richard Janse van Rensburg; 27 October 1993 (age 33); Cambridge, England
- Education: Alcuin College, York
- Known for: Watercolour, illustration
- Style: Faux-naïf
- Patrons: Reddit

Hector Richard Janse van Rensburg (born 27 October 1993), better known by his pseudonym Shitty Watercolour, is a British painter and cartoonist who started posting watercolour paintings on the social media website Reddit in February 2012, and later expanded to publishing his work on his own website, on Tumblr and on Twitter. He graduated from the University of York with a degree in philosophy, politics and economics.

== Background ==
Janse van Rensburg is from Cambridge and attended Hills Road Sixth Form College. His mother is Scottish and his father is South African. In 2011, he won a Wilkinson Quincentenary Prize, awarded by St. John's College, Cambridge, to the best entries in an essay competition for high-school students.

Boredom and depression led Janse van Rensburg to revisit an old watercolour set and seek subjects to paint. Already a Reddit user, he realised that submissions, comments, and usernames on the website provided him with ample illustration opportunities. At first the quality of his paintings was, in his own opinion, accurately described by his Reddit username Shitty_Watercolour. Encouraged by the response from Reddit users however, among whom he gathered a devoted following, his painting skills improved greatly.

== Influences ==
Many people have mistaken the artist for Quentin Blake, best known for illustrating children's books written by Roald Dahl. The painter considers this a compliment, and while denying that he is Quentin Blake, acknowledges that he is greatly inspired by him.

== Works ==
Shitty_Watercolour became popular on Reddit by posting his interpretations of pictures posted by Redditors, illustrating various comments on the subreddit /r/AskReddit, and illustrating usernames of Redditors. He often welcomes celebrities during their Reddit AMAs by posting a painting of them. He has painted his own interpretations of classic artworks by painters such as Edward Hopper and Leonardo da Vinci. Since early 2013, he has been going through a "sloth period", during which he has been painting sloths based on famous pieces of art.

Janse van Rensburg worked for the BBC for a few months, and has done paintings on commission for Intel, Lionsgate, ASUS, CNN, USA Network, BuzzFeed, and Prizeo.

Janse van Rensburg provided the illustrations for Daniel Howell's coming out video in June 2019.

Janse van Rensburg created the artwork for the software package management system yarn.

== Philanthropy ==
In October 2012, he live streamed a 12-hour painting session on YouTube to raise money for charity: water, a non-profit organisation which aims to provide drinking water in developing countries. Redditors donated a minimum of $10 to have a photo of their choice painted in a 5 cm by 5 cm square.

In July 2012, he painted a watercolour painting to help a Redditor propose to his girlfriend, and more paintings to celebrate their engagement.

== Media coverage ==
Shitty_Watercolour is consistently listed as one of the most popular and influential Redditors. His portrait of President Barack Obama during his August 2012 Reddit AMA was published on the President's official Tumblr and on various news websites, including CNN. This portrait of Obama was hung in the campaign headquarters. His impressions of classic artworks and his paintings of sloths have also received considerable attention in the media.
