= Siward's Howe =

Hill near York, North Yorkshire, England

Coordinates: 53.950°N 1.052°W

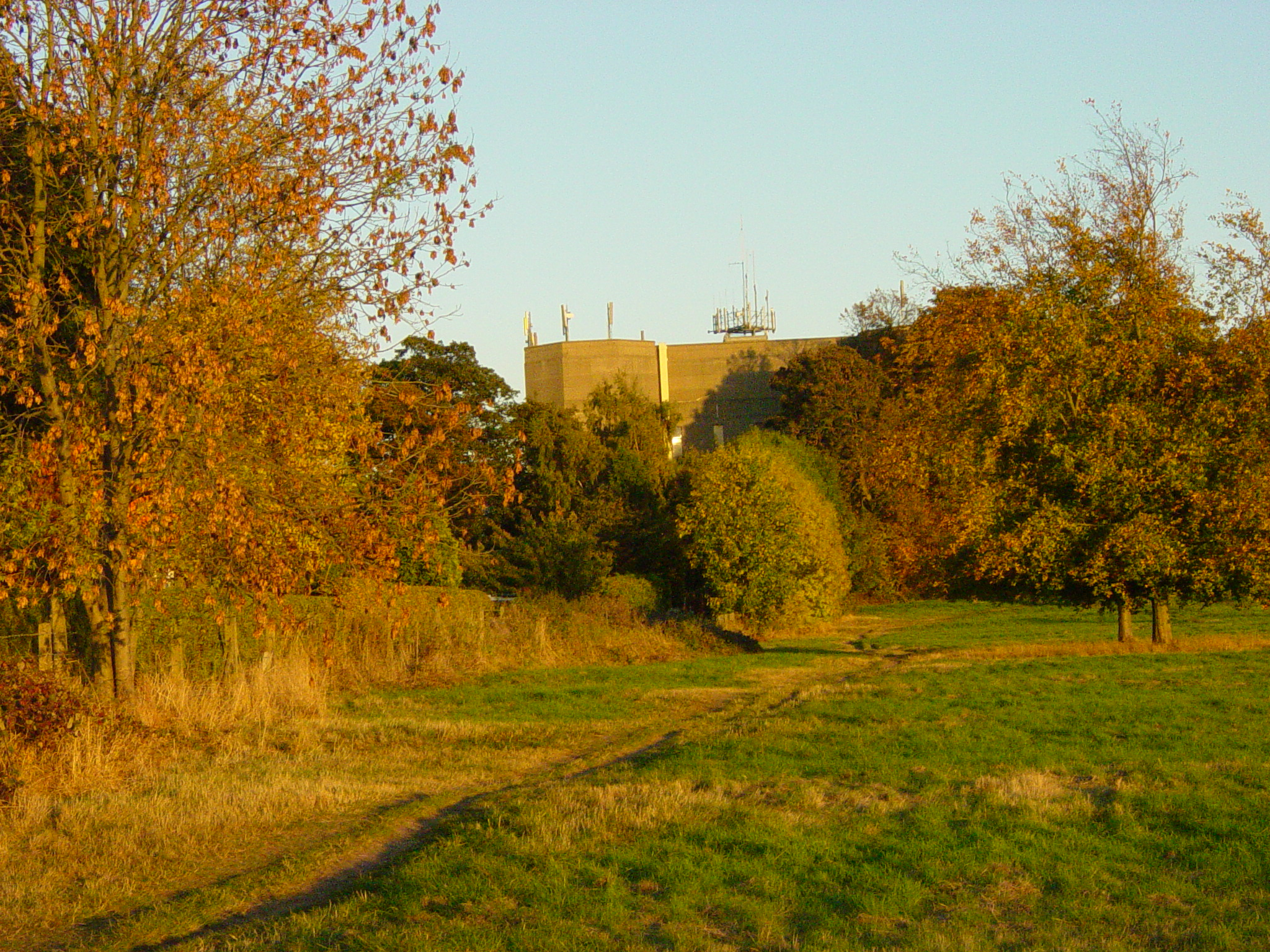
The water tower on top of Siward's Howe

Siwards Howe from the campus, 1978

Siward's Howe, sometimes written Siwards How and also known as Heslington Hill or Bunny Hill, is a terminal moraine located to the south-east of the city of York. The howe is situated north west of the Morrell Library building of the University of York. The southern side of the howe is part of Alcuin College of the University of York. Its imposing water tower is visible from many parts of the nearby suburbs of Tang Hall and Osbaldwick.

Howe, when derived from the Old Norse: haugr, means hill, knoll, or mound and may refer to a tumulus, or barrow. Siward's Howe is named for Siward, Earl of Northumbria, the 11th-century Danish warrior. He was romanticised in the William Shakespeare play, Macbeth. Siward died at York during 1055 and is rumoured to have been buried beneath the tumuli at the wooded summit.

== Other sources ==
- Aird, William M. (2004) Siward, earl of Northumbria (d. 1055), magnate (Oxford Dictionary of National Biography)
