= Siward, Earl of Northumbria =

11th-century Earl of Northumbria in England

Siward Sigvarðr Diger
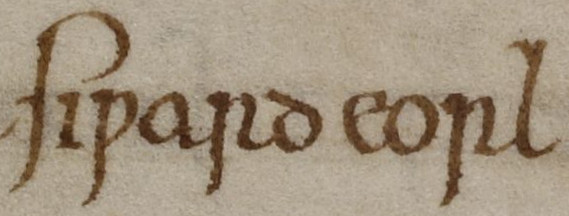
- Siƿard eorl (spelled with a wynn) in a manuscript of the Anglo-Saxon Chronicle (c. 1200)

Earl of Northumbria
- Reign: 1041–55

Earl in York
- Reign: from 1023–33
- Predecessor: Erik of Hlathir (for York); Eadwulf (for Bamburgh); Uhtred the Bold (for both)
- Successor: Tostig Godwinson
- Born: Scandinavia
- Died: 1055
- Burial: St Olave's Church, York
- Wives: Ælfflæd; Godgifu
- Issue: Osbjorn (unclear); Waltheof (Ælfflæd)
- Father: Bjorn (?)

Siward (/ˈsuːwərd/ or more recently /ˈsiːwərd/; Old English: Siƿard) or Sigurd (Old English: Sigeweard, Old Norse: Sigurðr digri; died 1055) was an important earl of 11th-century northern England. The Old Norse nickname Digri and its Latin translation Grossus ("the stout") are given to him by near-contemporary texts. He emerged as a regional strongman in England during the reign of Cnut ("Canute the Great", 1016–1035). Cnut was a Scandinavian ruler who conquered most of England in the 1010s, and Siward was one of many Scandinavians who came to England in the aftermath, rising to become sub-ruler of most of northern England. From 1033 at the latest, he was in control of southern Northumbria, present-day Yorkshire, governing as earl on Cnut's behalf.

Siward entrenched his position in northern England by marrying Ælfflæd, the daughter of Ealdred, Earl of Bamburgh. After killing Ealdred's successor Eadulf in 1041, Siward gained control of all Northumbria. He supported Cnut's successors Harthacnut and Edward with vital military aid and counsel, and probably gained control of the middle shires of Northampton and Huntingdon by the 1050s. There is some evidence that he spread Northumbrian control into Cumberland. In the early 1050s, Siward turned against the Scottish king Mac Bethad mac Findlaích ("Macbeth"). Despite the death of his son Osbjorn, Siward defeated Mac Bethad in battle in 1054. More than half a millennium later the adventure in Scotland earned him a place in William Shakespeare's Macbeth. Siward died in 1055, leaving one son, Waltheof, who would eventually become Earl of Northumbria in 1072. St Olave's church in York and nearby Heslington Hill are associated with Siward.

== Sources ==
Source material on Siward's life and career is scarce. No contemporary or near-contemporary biography has survived, and narratives from around the time of his life such as the Encomium Emmae and the Vita Ædwardi Regis scarcely mention him; historians depend on a few entries in the Anglo-Saxon Chronicle and comparable Irish sources. Later Anglo-Norman histories may or may not be reliable, but useful ones include the Chronicle of John of Worcester (compiled between 1124 and 1140), William of Malmesbury (writing between c. 1125 and 1142), Henry of Huntingdon (writing between c. 1133 and 1154), and Orderic Vitalis (writing between c. 1114 and 1141). Other sources include the material attributed to Symeon of Durham (compiled and written as extant between the late 11th century and the first half of the 12th century). Legendary material, such as that in hagiography or later medieval sources such as John of Fordun or Andrew of Wyntoun, is not generally regarded as useful beyond its limited potential for cleanly preserving earlier source material.

== Background ==
The dominions of King Cnut (Note that the Norwegian (now Swedish) lands of Jemtland, Herjedalen, Idre and Særna are not included in this map).

Siward's career in northern England spanned the reigns of four monarchs; from Cnut, Harold Harefoot, and Harthacnut, into the early years of Edward the Confessor. Most important was the reign of Cnut, in which so many new political figures rose to power that some historians compare it to the Norman Conquest five decades later. These "new men" were military figures, usually with weak hereditary links to the West Saxon royal house that Cnut had deposed. As Cnut ruled several Scandinavian kingdoms in addition to England, power at the highest level was delegated to such strongmen. In England, it fell to a handful of newly promoted "ealdormen" or "earls", who each ruled a shire or group of shires on behalf of the king. Siward was, in the words of historian Robin Fleming, "the third man in Cnut's new triumvirate of earls", the other two being Godwine, Earl of Wessex and Leofwine, Earl of Mercia.

Northern England in the 11th-century was a region quite distinct from the rest of the country. The former kingdom of Northumbria stretched from the Humber and Mersey estuaries, northward to the Firth of Forth, where, passing the western Kingdom of Strathclyde, it met the Kingdom of Alba (Scotland). Northumbria had been united with the West Saxon English kingdom only in the 950s, by King Eadred, and subsequent control was exerted through the agency of at least two ealdormen, one to the north and one to the south of the River Tees. The former is associated with the stronghold of Bamburgh, while the latter is associated with the great Roman city of York. It was a politically fragmented region. The western part, from Lancashire to Cumberland, formed an older British stronghold and experienced links with and settlement of Gaels, while in the rest of Northumbria; British (predominantly in Yorkshire and further North) English and Anglo-Scandinavian(generally restricted to the eastern coasts) regional magnates—thegns, holds and high-reeves—exercised a considerable degree of independence from the ealdormen. One such example was the magnate Thurbrand, a hold in Yorkshire, probably based in Holderness, whose family were frequently at odds with the ruling earls at Bamburgh.

== Ancestry ==
"The Stories of the ancients tell us that Ursus (a certain nobleman whom the Lord, contrary to what normally happens in human procreation, allowed to be created from a white bear as a father and a noblewoman as a mother), begot Spratlingus; Spratlingus begot Ulfius; and Ulfius begot Beorn, who was nicknamed Beresune, that is, "Bear's Son". This Beorn was Danish by race, a distinguished earl and famous soldier. As a sign, however, that due to part of his ancestry he was of a different species, nature had given him the ears of his father's line, namely those of a bear. In all other features he was of his mother's appearance. And after many manly deeds and military adventures, he begot a son, a tried imitator of his father's strength and military skill. His name was Siward, nicknamed Diere, that is, the Stout (grossus)".
— A description of Siward's ancestry and his father Beorn, taken from the Vita Waldevi, a saint's life dedicated to Siward's son Waltheof.

Historians generally claim Siward to be of Scandinavian origin, a conclusion supported by the Vita Ædwardi Regis, which states that Siward was "[called] Digri in the Danish tongue" (Danica lingua Digara). Legendary material incorporated in the Vita et passio Waldevi comitis (or simply Vita Waldevi), the hagiographic biography of Siward's son Waltheof, states that Siward was the son of a Scandinavian earl named Bjorn and provides a genealogy claiming that he was the descendant of a polar bear, a commonplace piece of Germanic folklore.

Historian Timothy Bolton has recently argued that the similarities between these genealogies is evidence of a shared family tradition between the descendants of Siward and Thorgil Sprakling. Bolton hypothesized that Siward's alleged father Bjorn was probably a historical figure, a brother of Thorgil Sprakling. Siward would then have been first cousin to Earl Ulf, the earl of Denmark who married Cnut's sister Estrith and founded the dynasty of Danish monarchs that eventually succeeded Cnut's. Bolton argued that the Sprakling family had only recently risen to prominence in Scandinavia, and so Siward's career in England was another indication of that family's success in Scandinavian politics.

The Vita Waldevi provides further legendary detail of Siward's journey from Scandinavia to England. According to the Vita, Siward passed through Orkney, killing a dragon there before moving on to Northumbria. There he encountered another dragon, before meeting an Odin-like old man on a hill, who handed him a raven banner and instructed him to proceed to London to receive the patronage of the king of England.

== Career under Cnut, Harold and Harthacnut ==
"[A]fter a short conversation the king took him [Siward] into his service, and promised him the first position of dignity which became vacant in his realm. After that Siward said farewell, and he and his men took the way back to London. On the bridge not far from the monastery [Westminster] he met the Earl of Huntingdon, Tosti, a Dane by birth; the king hated him because he had married Earl Godwine's daughter, sister to the queen. The earl crossed the foot-bridge so near Siward that he soiled his mantle with his dirty feet; for at that time it was fashionable to wear a mantle without any cord by which to hold it up. Then blood rushed to his heart; yet he checked himself from taking revenge on the spot, because the shame was inflicted upon him by one who was on his way to the king's hall. But he remained standing with his men by the same bridge until Tosti came from the king; then he drew his sword and hacked off Tosti's head, and went with it under his mantle back to the king's hall. Here he asked, according to his promise, to give him the earldom of Huntingdon. But as the earl had just left him, the king thought he was only joking. Then Siward related his deed, and, as sure proof, cast the head down before the king's feet. The king then kept his promise, and proclaimed him at once earl of Huntingdon ... A few days later, the Northmen began to attack the realm. The king then was in a state of uncertainty, and deliberated with the great men of his realm as to what means should be adopted; and they made over with one voice Northumberland, Cumberland and Westmoreland to Earl Siward, and the king invested him with earldom over them".
— A saga-like description of Siward's accession to power in England, taken from the Vita Waldevi

The exact date and context of Siward's arrival in England are unknown, though the Vita Waldevi offers a legendary account. Charters dating to 1019, 1024, 1032, 1033 and 1035 mention a Si[ge]ward Minister, "the thegn Siward", but it is impossible to securely identify any of these names with the man who became Earl of Northumbria. The earliest certain contemporary record of Siward occurs in a charter of King Cnut to Ælfric Puttoc, Archbishop of York, in 1033. This charter attestation can be identified as Siward the earl because he is styled dux ("earl").

Although it is clear that Siward was earl by 1033, he may have attained the position somewhat earlier. His predecessor Erik of Hlathir last appeared in the historical sources in 1023, leaving a ten-year gap during which Siward could have taken the position. Although William of Malmesbury asserted that Erik was driven back to Scandinavia, Scandinavian tradition firmly maintained he died in England. Historian William Kapelle believed that Erik ceased to be earl in or soon after 1023, and that Carl son of Thurbrand was appointed hold or high-reeve (heahgerefa) for the king in Yorkshire. Carl retained this position, it was argued, even after Siward was installed as earl a few years later, but from then on he acted as a deputy to the earl rather than to the king. Richard Fletcher remained agnostic on the point, although he did argue that Erik must have been dead by 1028. Timothy Bolton, although rejecting Kapelle's argument concerning Carl son of Thurbrand, believed Erik died c. 1023 and that the earldom may have remained vacant for a period. Bolton argued that Cnut left the earldom of Northumbria empty and appears to have paid it little attention until the last years of his reign, and another northerner Ealdred son of Uhtred rose to power in the political vacuum.

When Cnut died in 1035, there were a number of rival claimants for his throne. These included his sons Harthacnut and Harold Harefoot, as well as Alfred Ætheling and Edward (later, King Edward the Confessor), the exiled sons of Æthelred the Unready (who were also Harthacnut's half-brothers). Isolated in Scandinavia, Harthacnut was unable to prevent Harold Harefoot seizing the crown for himself. Ruling England from 1035, Harold died in 1040 just as Harthacnut was preparing an invasion. Arriving soon after Harold's death, Harthacnut reigned in England only two years before his own death in 1042, a death that led to the peaceful succession of Edward. Frank Barlow speculated on Siward's political stance, guessing that during these upheavals Siward assumed "a position of benevolent or prudent neutrality".

Siward is found in 1038, as Sywardus Comes ("Earl Siward"), witnessing a charter of King Harthacnut to the Abbey of Bury St Edmunds. He witnessed a confirmation granted by Harthacnut to Fécamp Abbey, between 1040 and 1042, of an earlier grant made by Cnut. In 1042, he witnessed grants by Harthacnut to Abingdon Abbey and to Ælfwine, Bishop of Winchester.

Siward was, at some stage, married to Ælfflæd, daughter of Ealdred II of Bamburgh, and granddaughter of Uhtred the Bold. The Anglo-Saxon Chronicle asserts that, in 1041 Eadwulf, Earl of Bamburgh, was "betrayed" by King Harthacnut. The "betrayal" seems to have been carried out by Siward; since when the Libellus de Exordio and other sources write about the same event, they say that Siward attacked and killed Eadwulf. It was thus that Siward became earl of all Northumbria, perhaps the first person to do so since Uhtred the Bold. It is possible that Siward used Ælfflæd's lineage to claim the earldom of Bamburgh for himself, although it is unclear whether the marriage took place before or after Siward killed Eadwulf. Kapelle has pointed out that no ruler of Bamburgh after Uhtred is attested at the English royal court, which he argued "must mean they were in revolt" against the monarchy, and that Siward's attack may therefore have been encouraged by a monarch wishing to crush a rebellious or disloyal vassal. Siward however probably had his own interests too. Killing Eadwulf eliminated his main rival in the north, and the marriage associated him with the family of Uhtred the Bold, and with Uhtred's surviving grandson Gospatric.

There may nonetheless be a connection between the murder of Eadwulf and events further south. For the same year the Chronicle of John of Worcester related that, because of an attack on two of Harthacnut's tax-collectors there, Siward took part in a reprisal on the city and monastery of Worcester. Harthacnut reigned only another year, dying on 8 June 1042. He was succeeded by the exiled English ætheling Edward. As an ætheling, a royal prince with a present or likely future claim on the throne, Edward appears to have been invited back by Harthacnut in 1041, fortuitously smoothing over the coming change in ruler. Edward was crowned king on Easter Day, 3 April 1043.

== English affairs under Edward the Confessor ==
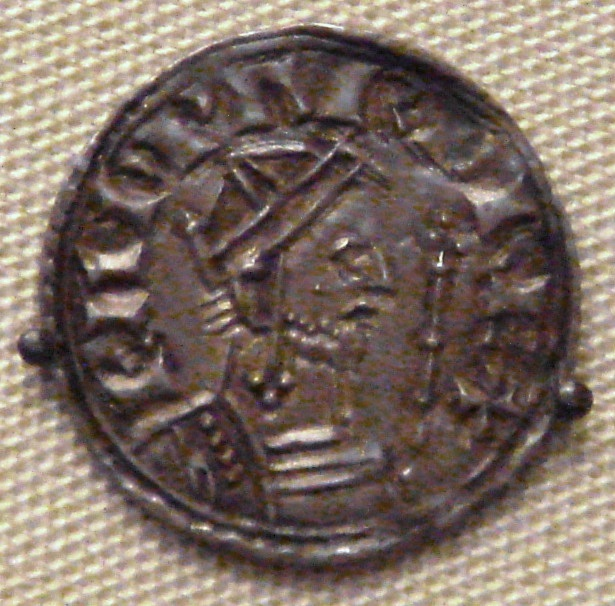
Coin of King Edward the Confessor

Relations between Siward and King Edward appear to have been good. Neither Siward nor any associates of Siward were punished by Edward in later years. In fact, Siward appears to have been one of Edward's most powerful supporters. On 16 November 1043, Siward, along with Earls Godwine of Wessex and Leofric of Mercia, marched with King Edward against his mother, Queen Emma, helping the king to deprive the queen of her huge treasury. Edward then accused Emma of treason and deposed Stigand, Bishop of Elmham, from his position "because he was closest to his mother's counsel".

The Norman propagandist and historian, William of Poitiers, claimed that Siward was among those who had sworn an oath to uphold Edward the Confessor's alleged declaration that William II, Duke of Normandy (later King William I), was to be his heir. Others said to have made that oath were Earls Godwine of Wessex and Leofric of Mercia, along with Stigand, who had been pardoned in 1044, and raised to Bishop of Winchester in 1047. If this did happen, it was probably during or a little before spring 1051, when Robert, Archbishop of Canterbury, was journeying to Rome for his pallium.

In 1051 Siward, along with Earls Leofric and Ralph the Timid, mobilised forces in defence of the king against a rebellion by Earl Godwine and his sons. The Anglo-Saxon Chronicle relates that although Siward had to call up reinforcements, King Edward was successful and Earl Godwine was temporarily exiled. Earl Godwine remained a threat in exile, and the continued "belligerent support" of Siward and Leofric was thus vital to King Edward's safety. It was apparently, however, the reluctance of these two earls to fight Earl Godwine that contributed to Godwine's re-establishment in England in 1052.

There is evidence to suggest that Siward extended his power southward, bringing the shire of Northampton into his control in the 1040s and the shire of Huntingdon in the 1050s. The evidence comes from royal writs addressed to Siward as earl in these shires. Siward's predecessors as earl in these areas were other Scandinavians, Thuri and Bjorn son of Earl Ulf; the former was styled "earl of the Midlanders" (comes mediterraneorum), showing that this earldom represented the earlier polity of the Middle Angles of Mercia. It was this area, rather than Northumbria, to which Siward's descendants were most attached.

Likewise, it has been argued that Siward brought Cumberland, thought by some historians to have been lost to Strathclyde, back under Northumbrian lordship. The evidence comes from a document known to historians as "Gospatric's Writ". This is a written instruction, issued either by the future Gospatric, Earl of Northumbria, or Gospatric, son of Earl Uhtred, that was addressed to all Gospatric's kindred and to the notables dwelling in the "all the lands that were Cumbrian" (on eallun þam landann þeo Cōmbres); it ordered that one Thorfinn mac Thore be free in all things (þ Thorfynn mac Thore beo swa freo in eallan ðynges) in Allerdale, and that no man is to break the peace which was given by Gospatric and Earl Siward. Historians such as Charles Phythian-Adams believed that such phraseology indicated that Siward conquered the region from its previous rulers, although others, like William Kapelle, believed that the region had come, were it ever lost, back into English power before Siward's time.

A little can be said about Siward's relations with the Northumbrian church, in particular with regard to his relations with Durham. As a result of Siward's marriage to Ælfflæd, Siward gained possession of a group of estates in Teesside claimed by the bishops of Durham. Acquisition of these estates might have brought opposition from the Bishop of Durham, but Æthelric the incumbent had been expelled by the clergy of Durham in either 1045 or 1046 and, according to the Libellus de Exordio, only returned by bribing Siward. According to the Libellus, the clergy were "terrified and overwhelmed by the fearful power of the earl" and "were compelled willy nilly to be reconciled to the bishop, and to admit him into his episcopal see". Despite this, Siward escaped censure in the writings of later Durham monks, something which suggests relations between Siward and Durham were probably good in general.

Siward can be found witnessing numerous charters during Edward's reign, though not as many as the Godwinsons; Siward usually comes third in lists of earls, behind Godwine and Leofric but ahead of Godwine's sons and the other earls. He witnessed at least seven, possibly nine, extant charters in 1044, six or seven in 1045, two in 1046, one in 1048 and one in 1049. A Dux ("earl") named Sihroþ and Sihroð witnessed two charters in 1050, and this may be Siward. There is another attestation in 1050, and his name appears in two dubious witness lists attached to charters dating to 1052 and 1054. Possibly Siward's last historical appearance in English legal documents is in the agreement made—probably at Lincoln—between Wulfwig, Bishop of Dorchester, and Earl Leofric, dating to between 1053 and 1055.

== Expedition against the Scots ==
"Around this time Siward, the mighty earl of Northumbria, almost a giant in stature, very strong mentally and physically, sent his son to conquer Scotland. When they came back and reported to his father that he had been killed in battle, he asked 'Did he receive his fatal wound in the front or the back of his body?' The messengers said 'In the front'. Then he said, 'That makes me very happy, for I consider no other death worthy for me or my son'. Then Siward set out for Scotland, and defeated the king in battle, destroyed the whole realm, and having destroyed it, subjected it to himself".
— A description of Osbjorn's death and Siward's reaction, taken from the Historia Anglorum of Henry of Huntingdon

Siward is perhaps most famous for his expedition in 1054 against Macbeth, King of Scotland, an expedition that cost Siward his eldest son, Osbjorn. The origin of Siward's conflict with the Scots is unclear. According to the Libellus de Exordio, in 1039 or 1040, the Scottish king Donnchad mac Crínáin (Duncan I) attacked northern Northumbria and besieged Durham. Within a year, Macbeth had deposed and killed Donnchad. The failed siege occurred a year before Siward attacked and killed Earl Eadwulf of Bamburgh, and though no connection between the two events is clear it is likely that they were linked.

The Annals of Lindisfarne and Durham, written in the early 12th century, relate under the year 1046 that "Earl Siward with a great army came to Scotland, and expelled king Macbeth, and appointed another; but after his departure Mac Bethad recovered his kingdom". Historian William Kapelle thought that this was a genuine event of the 1040s, related to the Annals of Tigernach entry for 1045 that reported a "battle between the Scots" which led to the death of Crínán of Dunkeld, Donnchad's father; Kapelle thought that Siward had tried to place Crínán's son and Donnchad's brother Maldred on the Scottish throne. Another historian, Alex Woolf, argued that the Annals of Lindisfarne and Durham entry was probably referring to the invasion of Siward in 1054, but misplaced under 1046.

During the invasion of 1054, a battle was fought somewhere in Scotland north of the Firth of Forth, a battle known variously as the "Battle of the Seven Sleepers" or the "Battle of Dunsinane". The tradition that the battle actually took place at Dunsinane has its origins in later medieval legend. The earliest mention of Dunsinane as the location of the battle is in the early 15th century by Andrew of Wyntoun.

The earliest contemporary English account of the battle is found in the Anglo-Saxon Chronicle, recension D:

| Her ferde Siward eolr mid miclum here on Scotland, ægðer ge mid scyphere 7 mid landfyrde, 7 feaht wið Scottas, 7 aflymde þone kyng Macbeoðen, 7 ofsloh eall þæt þær betst wæs on þam lande, 7 lædde þonan micele herehuðe swilce nan man ær ne begeat, | At this time earl Siward went with a great army into Scotland, with both fleet and a land-force; and fought against the Scots, and put to flight the king Macbeth, and slew all that were best in the land, and brought thence much war-spoil, such as no man obtained before; |
| ac his sunu Osbarn, 7 his sweostor suna Sihward, 7 of his huscarlum 7 eac þæs cynges wurdon þær ofslægene on þone dæg Septem Dormientium.. | And there were slain his son Osbjorn, and his sister's son Siward, and some of his housecarls, and also of the king's, on the day of the Seven Sleepers (27 July). |

John of Worcester, using a related version of the Anglo-Saxon Chronicle, adds that Normans named Osbern Pentecost and Hugh, who had joined Macbeth earlier after fleeing from England, were killed in the battle. The battle is mentioned in the Irish annals too, briefly in the Annals of Tigernach and more extensively in the Annals of Ulster:

| Cath eter firu Alban & Saxanu i torchradur tri mile do Feraib Alban & mile co leth do Shaxanaib im Dolfinn m. Finntuir. | A battle [was fought] between the men of Scotland and the English; and in it fell three thousand of the men of Scotland, and one thousand five hundred of the English, including Dolfin, Finntur's son; |

Dolfin is unidentified, but may have been a relation of Macbeth's enemy Crínán of Dunkeld, on the basis that some of Crínán's descendants may have borne this name.

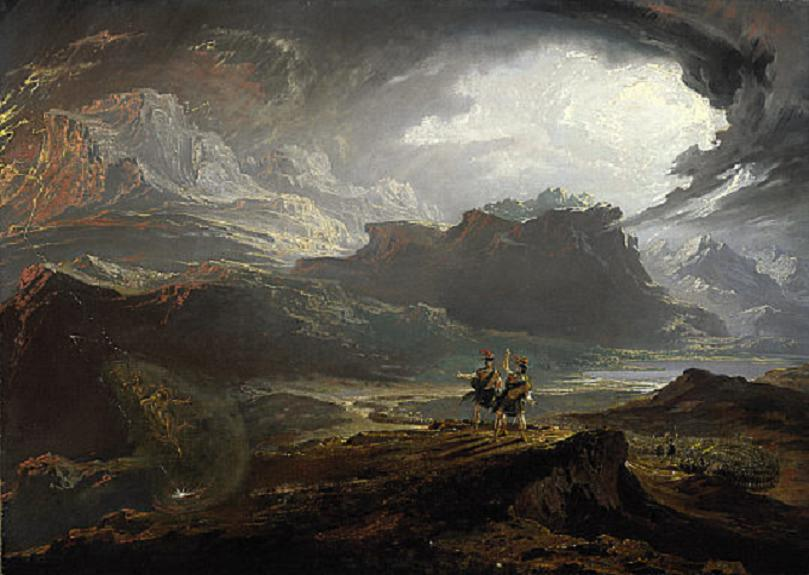
Anachronistic early 19th-century depiction by John Martin of Mac Bethad (centre-right) watching Siward's Northumbrian army approaching (right)

The purpose of Siward's invasion is unclear, but it may be related to the identity of the "Máel Coluim" (Malcolm) mentioned in the sources. The early 12th-century chronicle attributed to John of Worcester, probably using an earlier source, wrote that Siward defeated Macbeth and made "Máel Coluim, son of the king of the Cumbrians" a king (Malcolmum, regis Cumbrorum filium, ut rex jusserat, regem constituit). The identity of Máel Coluim and the reasons for Siward's help are controversial. The traditional historical interpretation was that "Máel Coluim" is Máel Coluim mac Donnchada, known sometimes today as Malcolm III or Malcolm Canmore, and that Siward was attempting to oust Macbeth in his favour.

The traditional historical interpretation that "Máel Coluim" is Máel Coluim mac Donnchada derives from the Chronicle attributed to the 14th-century chronicler of Scotland, John of Fordun, as well as from earlier sources such as William of Malmesbury. The latter reported that Mac Bethad was killed in the battle by Siward, but it is known that Mac Bethad outlived Siward by two years. A. A. M. Duncan argued in 2002 that, using the Anglo-Saxon Chronicle entry as their source, later writers innocently misidentified Máel Coluim "son of the king of the Cumbrians" with the later Scottish king of the same name. Duncan's argument has been supported by several subsequent historians specialising in the era, such as Richard Oram, Dauvit Broun and Alex Woolf. It has also been suggested that Máel Coluim may have been a son of the Strathclyde British king Owain Foel, perhaps by a daughter of Máel Coluim II, King of Scotland.

Duncan in fact believes that the Battle of the Seven Sleepers did not lead directly to a change of leadership in the Kingdom of Scotland. It has been suggested that the chief consequence of Siward's expedition was not the overthrow of Mac Bethad, but the transfer of British territory—perhaps previously lying under Scottish suzerainty—to Northumbrian overlordship. Alex Woolf has posited that, in such a context, Máel Coluim might have been a discontented Cumbrian prince who had been forced to "put himself under English protection". Evidence for Northumbrian control of Strathclyde in this period includes 11th-century Northumbrian masonry found at the site of Glasgow Cathedral as well as early 12th-century claims from the archbishopric of York that Archbishop Cynesige (1051–1060) had consecrated two Bishops of Glasgow.

== Death and legacy ==
"Siward, the stalwart earl, being stricken by dysentery, felt that death was near, and said, "How shameful it is that I, who could not die in so many battles, should have been saved for the ignominious death of a cow! At least clothe me in my impenetrable breastplate, gird me with my sword, place my helmet on my head, my shield in my left hand, my gilded battle-axe in my right, that I, the bravest of soldiers, may die like a soldier." He spoke, and armed as he had requested, he gave up his spirit with honour".
— A description of Siward's death, taken from the Historia Anglorum of Henry of Huntingdon.

The 12th-century historian, Henry of Huntingdon, in his Historia Anglorum, relates that when Siward was attacked by dysentery, fearing to die "like a cow" and wishing rather to die like a soldier, he clothed himself in armour and took to hand an axe and shield. Ennobled in such a manner, Siward died. This anecdote is of doubtful historicity, and is thought to be derived from the saga devoted to Earl Siward, now lost. The Vita Ædwardi Regis states that Siward died at York and was buried in "the monastery of St Olaf" at Galmanho, a claim confirmed by the Anglo-Saxon Chronicle, John of Worcester, and the Historia Regum.

Material incorporated in two surviving sources is thought by some to attest to the existence of a lost saga or some other kind of literary tradition concerning Siward's life. The first source is the Vita et Passio Waldevi, a hagiographic history of Siward's cult-inspiring son Waltheof. This text contains an account of Waltheof's paternal origin, and in the process recounts certain adventures of his father Siward. The second major witness of the tradition is Henry of Huntingdon's Historia Anglorum, which contains extracts of saga-like material relating to Siward's invasion of Scotland (1054) and his death (1055). The Anglo-Saxonist Frank Stenton declared that Siward was "not a statesman, but a Danish warrior of the primitive type". Writers in the half-century after his death remembered Siward as a strong ruler who brought peace and suppressed brigandage.

Siward died more than a decade before the death of Edward the Confessor, but despite this the Domesday Book of 1086 recorded 4 manors, 3 in Yorkshire and 1 in Derbyshire, owned directly by Earl Siward in 1066, all of them subsequently held by Hugh d'Avranches, Earl of Chester. This land was stated to have been worth £212, while his son Waltheof was said to have held £136 worth of land across 9 counties. Domesday records give an incomplete picture of Siward's holdings. In total it recorded property worth £348 for Siward and his son, which on its own would compare poorly with the £2493 in value recorded to have been held by the family of the earls of Mercia. Of the latter, however, Morcar of Mercia, Earl of Northumbria on the day of King Edward's death, possessed land worth £968, while Tostig, exiled earl at the time, had land worth £491; both may have come into possession of some of Siward's land in the course of becoming Earls of Northumbria. Moreover, the counties that would become Durham, Northumberland, Cumberland and Westmorland were largely omitted from the survey, while, besides being only very poorly documented, the lands in Yorkshire had been severely devastated and devalued during the Harrying of the North.

Siward is said to have built a church dedicated to St Olaf at Galmanho, York. The record of his burial in this church is the only notice of a non-royal lay burial inside a church in pre-Norman England. Siward's Howe, i.e., Heslington Hill near York, was most likely named after Earl Siward, although probably because Siward held popular courts there rather than because it was his burial place.

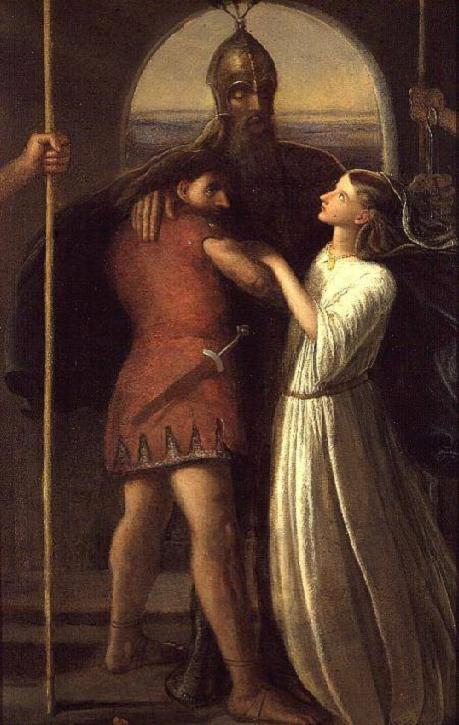
The Death of Earl Siward (1861) by James Smetham, a 19th-century representation of Earl Siward readying for death

One of Siward's sons is known to have survived him, Waltheof, whose mother was Ælfflæd. Waltheof later rose to be an earl in the East Midlands before becoming Earl of Northumbria. When Waltheof rebelled against William the Conqueror, however, the act led to his execution and to his subsequent veneration as a saint at Crowland Abbey. Waltheof's daughter married David I, King of the Scots, and through this connection Siward became one of the many ancestors of the later Scottish and British monarchs.

Besides Ælfflæd, Siward is known to have been married to a woman named Godgifu, who died before Siward. The marriage is known from a grant she made of territory around Stamford, Lincolnshire, to Peterborough Abbey. Although no surviving children are attested, and no source states the name of Osbjorn's mother, this marriage has nonetheless raised the possibility that Waltheof and Osbjorn were born to different mothers, and William Kapelle suggested that Siward may have originally intended Osbjorn to inherit his southern territories while Waltheof inherited those territories in the north associated with the family of his mother Ælfflæd.

== Notes ==
Siward, Earl of Northumbria Died: 1055
| Preceded by Erik of Hlathir; As Earl of York | Earl of York; 1023 & 1033–1041 | Earldom of Bernicia incorporated by Siward |
| Preceded by Himself; As Earl in York | Earl of Northumbria; Last held by Uhtred the Bold in 1016; 1041–1055 | Succeeded by Tostig Godwinson |
| Preceded by Eadwulf IV; As Earl of Bernicia | Earl of Northumbria; Last held by Uhtred the Bold in 1016; 1041–1055 | Succeeded by Tostig Godwinson |
