= Osbeorn Bulax =

Son of Siward, Earl of Northumbria (died 1055)

Osbeorn (Osbjorn, Osbert)

Personal details
- Died: 27 July 1054 Scotland (north of the Firth of Forth)
- Children: Siward Barn
- Parents: Siward, Earl of Northumbria (father); Ælfflæd or Godgifu (mother)
- Nickname: Bulax

Osbeorn, also spelled Osbjorn and Osbert (died c. 1054), given the nickname Bulax, was the son of Siward, Earl of Northumbria (died 1055). He is one of two known sons of Siward, believed to be the elder. While it is normally assumed he was the son of Siward's Bamburgh wife Ælfflæd, it has been suggested by William Kapelle that Osbeorn's mother was not Ælfflæd. The nickname "Bulax" probably represents the Old Norse term for "Poleaxe".

According to the most reliable sources, he died at the Battle of the Seven Sleepers, fought somewhere in Scotland between Siward and Mac Bethad mac Findlaích, King of the Scots, in 1054. Under this year, the Anglo-Saxon Chronicle, recension D, related that:

"At this time earl Siward went with a great army into Scotland, with both fleet and a land-force; and fought against the Scots, and put to flight the king Mac Bethad, and slew all that were best in the land, and brought thence much war-spoil, such as no man obtained before; And there were slain his son Osbeorn, and his sister's son Siward, and some of his housecarls, and also of the king's, on the day of the Seven Sleepers (July 27)."

This battle was fought somewhere in Scotland north of the Firth of Forth, and is known variously as the "Battle of the Seven Sleepers" or the "Battle of Dunsinane". The location Dunsinane is not accepted as historical by modern historians, resting as it does on later medieval accounts. The earliest mention of Dunsinane as the location of the battle being the early 15th-century account by Andrew of Wyntoun.

In recension C of the Anglo-Saxon Chronicle, the names of the slain are omitted, an omission repeated by the Chronicle of John of Worcester.

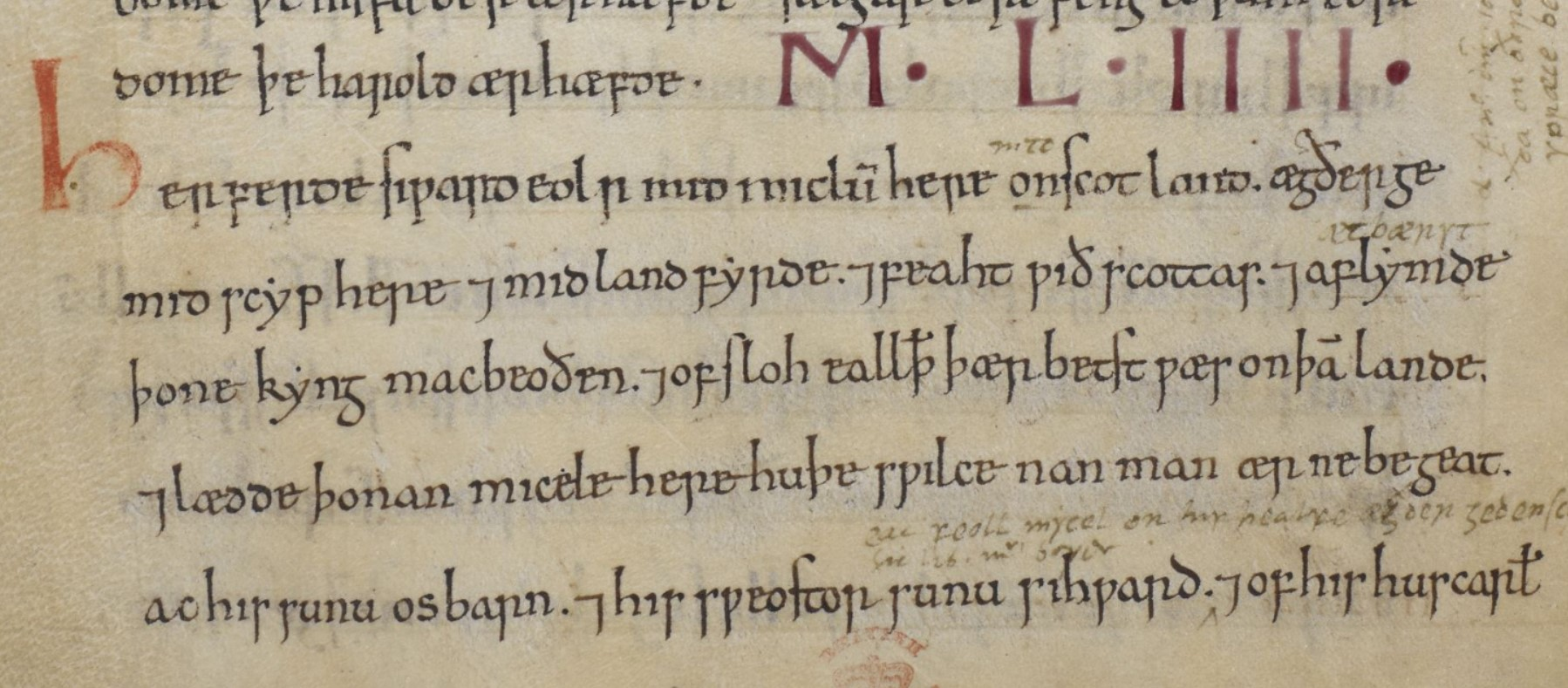
Page from the Anglo-Saxon Chronicle mentioning the death of Osbeorn.

Henry of Huntingdon related that Osbeorn had been sent to Scotland ahead of Siward:

"[Siward] sent his son to acquire Scotland. And when they reported to his father that he had been slain in battle, [Siward] said, 'Did he receive the mortal wound in front of his body, or behind?' The messengers said. 'In front'. And he replied: 'I rejoice wholly, for I would deem myself or my son worthy of no meaner death'. Siward therefore marched into Scotland and conquered the king battle ... "

Another legendary account, in the Vita et Passio Waldevi, a hagiography of Osbeorn's brother Waltheof, claimed that Osbeorn, called "Osbert Bulax", was killed by Northumbrians while his father was absent in Scotland. The accounts in Henry of Huntingdon and the Vita et Passio Waldevi are thought to be derived from a saga devoted to the life of Earl Siward.

Geoffrey Gaimar's account related activity in 1053, an agreement made between Siward and Mac Bethad, but a death of Osbeorn is not mentioned.

Osbeorn's death left Siward's legacy in danger. When he died the following year, his only surviving son Waltheof (Osbeorn's brother) was underage and thus did not succeed immediately to the whole territory ruled by Siward, Northumbria going instead to Tostig Godwinson.

Osbeorn Bulax was fictionalised as Young Siward in the tragedy Macbeth by William Shakespeare.
