= The British Grenadiers =

Commonwealth musical composition

"The British Grenadiers"
Performed by the United States Army Band Strings ensemble in 2007

"The British Grenadiers", performed during the Trooping the Colour 2017

"The British Grenadiers" is a traditional marching song of British and Commonwealth military units whose badge of identification features a grenade, the tune of which dates from the 17th century. It is the regimental quick march of the Royal Artillery (since 1716), the Corps of Royal Engineers (since 1787), the Honourable Artillery Company (since 1716), the Grenadier Guards (since 1763), and the Royal Regiment of Fusiliers (since 1763). It is also an authorized march of the Royal Australian Artillery, the Royal Gibraltar Regiment, the Royal Regiment of Canadian Artillery, the Canadian Grenadier Guards, the Royal Regiment of Canada, and the Princess Louise Fusiliers. The standard orchestration for the military band was approved in 1762, when the Royal Artillery Band (initiated in 1557) became recognized officially, and for all other "grenade" regiments in 1763, when the remaining unofficial bands gained official status.

== History ==
The exact origins of the tune are disputed but generally date to the early 17th century. It appears in John Playford's 1728 collection of dance tunes as "The New Bath", while Victorian musicologist William Chappell also suggested links to a 1622 work called "Sir Edward Nowell's Delight". The debate is best summarised by the composer Ernest Walker in 1907 who described the melody as "three centuries' evolution of an Elizabethan tune".

The melody was introduced into Great Britain as a military march during the 1689–1702 reign of William III and has similarities with one written for Prince John William of Friesland (1687–1711). Henry Grattan Flood suggested as another candidate the 1672 Dutch march "Wilhelmus van Nassouwe", which in turn was a reworking of a French version from 1568.

"The British Grenadiers" refers to grenadiers in general, not the Grenadier Guards Regiment, and all Fusilier units were entitled to use it. It allegedly commemorates an assault in August 1695 by 700 British grenadiers on the French-held fortress of Namur during the Nine Years' War. A tune known as 'The Granadeer's March' was mentioned in a London publication in 1706, although it is not clear that it was the same melody known today. Francis Grose in his 1786 work Military Antiquities quoted two lines of the lyrics ("Come let us fill a bumper, and drink a health to those,/Who wear the caps and pouches, and eke the looped clothes") as part of a "grenadier song" he already considered to be "old".

It was a popular tune in both Great Britain and North America throughout the 18th and 19th centuries and remains so. It is most commonly heard today in the annual Trooping the Colour ceremony when the Colour Escort marches into position on Horse Guards Parade. Like "Rule, Britannia!", the song is frequently used in film and television to introduce a British setting or character, or indicate stereotypical Britishness. Owing to its popularity, the tune has been frequently set to different texts, including church hymns.

== Lyrics and melody ==
The following text may date back to the War of Spanish Succession (1702–1713), since it refers to the grenadiers throwing grenades and the men wearing "caps and pouches" (i.e. the tall grenadier caps, worn by these elite troops, and the heavy satchel in which grenades were carried) and "loupèd clothes" – coats with broad bands of 'lace' across the chest that distinguished early grenadiers.

Some talk of Alexander, and some of Hercules
Of Hector and Lysander, and such great names as these.
But of all the world's brave heroes, there's none that can compare.
With a tow, row, row, row, row, row, to the British Grenadiers.

Those heroes of antiquity ne'er saw a cannon ball,
Or knew the force of powder to slay their foes withal.
But our brave boys do know it, and banish all their fears,
With a tow, row, row, row, row, row, for the British Grenadiers.

Whene'er we are commanded to storm the palisades,
Our leaders march with fusees, and we with hand grenades.
We throw them from the glacis, about the enemies' ears. (Note: Sometimes sung as "about the Frenchmen's ears".)
With a tow, row, row, row, row, row, for the British Grenadiers.

And when the siege is over, we to the town repair.
The townsmen cry, "Hurrah, boys, here comes a Grenadier!
Here come the Grenadiers, my boys, who know no doubts or fears!
Then sing tow, row, row, row, row, row, for the British Grenadiers.

Then let us fill a bumper, and drink a health of those
Who carry caps and pouches, and wear the loopèd clothes.
May they and their commanders live happy all their years.
With a tow, row, row, row, row, row, for the British Grenadiers.

== Historical terms ==
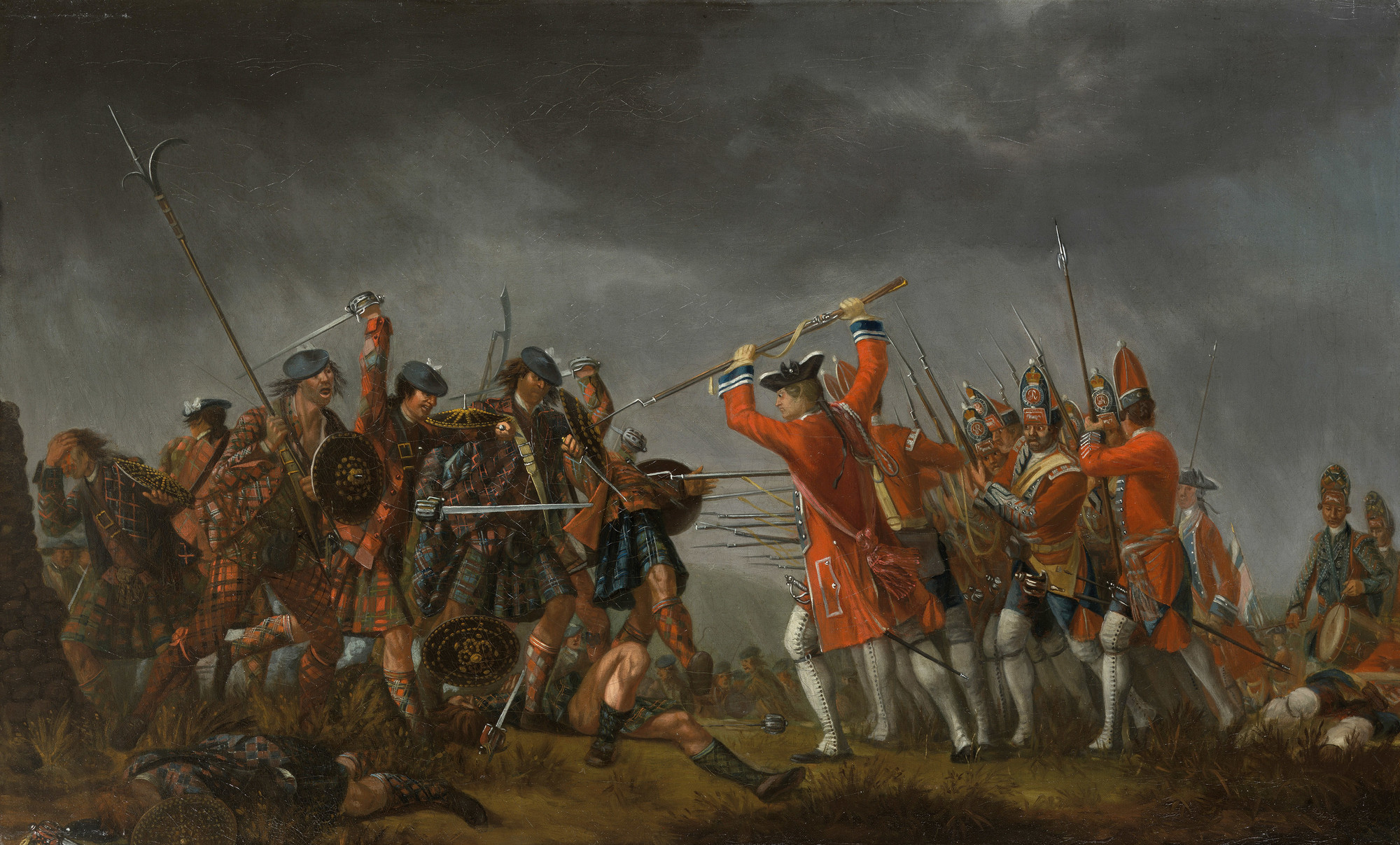
An Incident in the Rebellion of 1745, painted circa 1750. Grenadiers are shown at right; their officer (who wears a red sash to show his rank) wields a fusee

There are a number of words in the song not commonly used or whose meaning is obscure:

- Fusee: shortened muskets carried by Grenadier officers, sometimes called fusils. (Note: Officers from other units did not carry a musket, but instead used a type of short pike known as a spontoon.) This is accurately depicted in David Morier's painting of the Highland charge at the Battle of Culloden: the Government troops are grenadiers and their officer wields a fusil.
- Glacis: a smooth sloping embankment usually in front of the walls of a fort; designed to deflect cannonballs, it also gave defenders a clear field of fire, making it a dangerous place to stand upright and throw grenades.
- Bumper: any drinking container used in a toast, normally filled with beer or other alcoholic drink.
- Loupèd: 'looped' pronounced "loup-ed" to scan; it refers to the lace button-holes or 'loops' on grenadier uniforms.
- Tow, row, row, row: mimics the rhythm and beat of the drums used to keep soldiers in step.

== Historic reception ==
- Before the American Revolution, Joseph Warren wrote a parody song called "Free America" to the same tune in 1774.
- Edward Lysaght (1763–1811), an Irish poet and supporter of the Irish Volunteers, dedicated his ballad "The Man Who Led the Van of the Irish Volunteers" to the Irish politician Henry Grattan. True to his mischievous humour, he used the English melody of "The British Grenadiers".
- The song appears as the main theme in the finale of Ignaz Moscheles' Piano Concerto No. 4, Op. 64 (1823).
- In 1871, female students of Girton College at the University of Cambridge composed lyrics to the tune of the song, titled "The Girton Pioneers", to honour the first three women who passed the university's tripos exams.
- The melody places a central role in the second movement of Charles Ives' orchestral piece Three Places in New England, "Putnam's Camp, Redding, Connecticut" (1912–16, rev. 1929), in which Ives re-used his 1904 compositions Overture and March: 1776 and the "Country Band" march which use the melody as well.
- In 1966, the pioneer of electronic music, Max Mathews, transformed the march into the American march "When Johnny Comes Marching Home" through a process of analysis and interpolation.
- Harold Baum, a professor of biochemistry at Chelsea College in London, wrote lyrics for the annual Christmas party of his department, including "In Praise of E. M. P.", a sung description of glycolysis set to the melody of the song. A selection of these songs, with a foreword by Hans Adolf Krebs, was published by Pergamon Press in 1982.
- In the Carnival of Basel, the melody is known as the first verse of the march "Arabi".
- In the 1944 Universal Sherlock Holmes film The Scarlet Claw, the first lines of the song are sung by the character Potts, played by Gerald Hamer.
- This song was playing in the car (along with "Serbia Strong") of shooter Brenton Tarrant during the Christchurch mosque shootings.

== See also ==
- Band of the Grenadier Guards
