= Battle of Dorsum Crup =

Battle fought in 965 in Perthshire between Dub's men and Cuilén's men

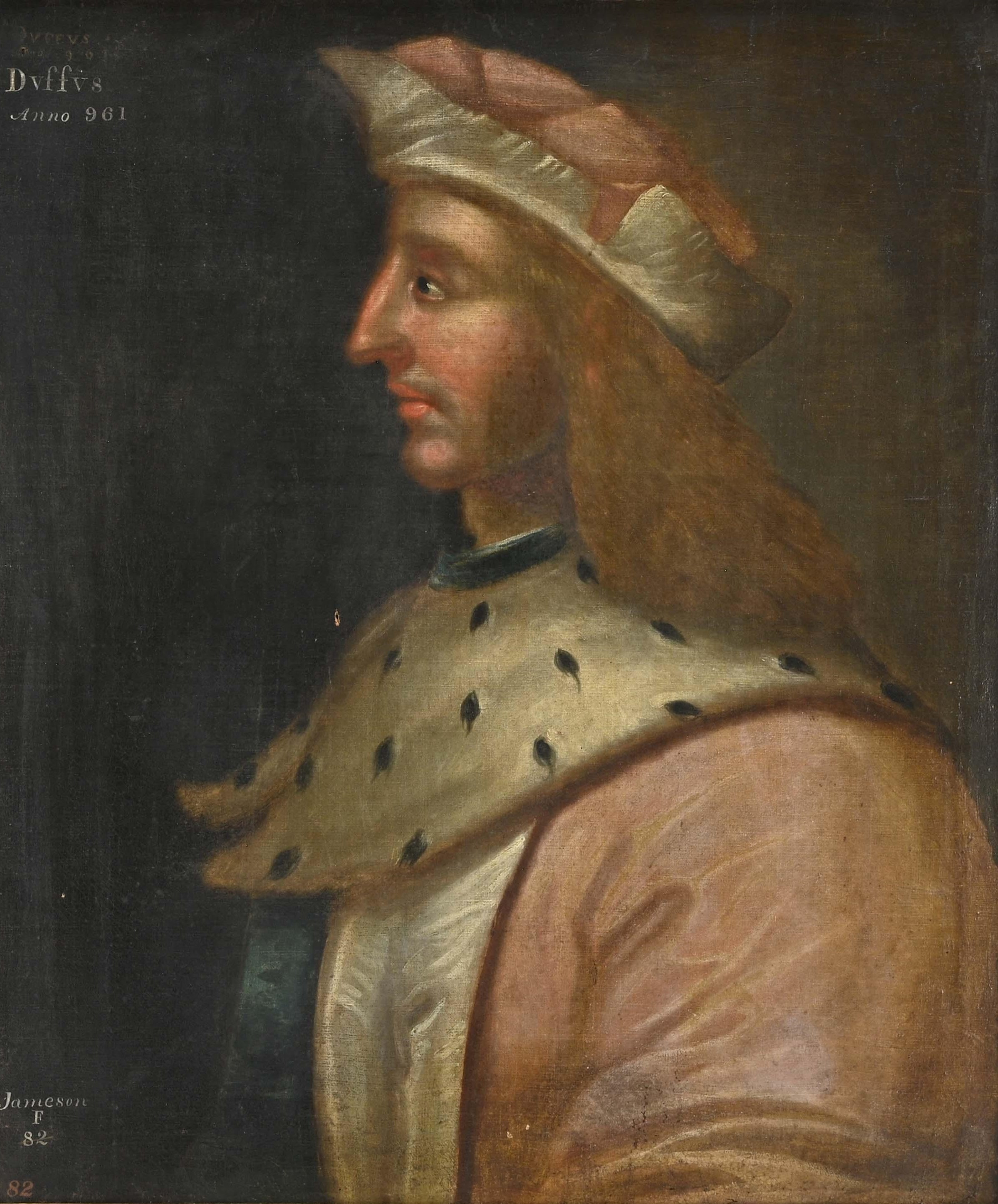
- ~1633 Painting of King Dub of Scotland
Date	965
Location	Duncrub, Perthshire
Result	Victory for Dub's men

Belligerents
Dub's men	Cuilén's men

Commanders and leaders
King Dub	Cuilén mac Illuilb

The Battle of Dorsum Crup, also known as the Battle of Duncrub, was fought in 965 in Duncrub, Scotland, between men loyal to Cuilén mac Illuilb and men loyal to Dub mac Maíl Coluim. The battle was a victory for Dub's men.

== Background ==
In 962, Dub's cousin, king Ildulb mac Causantín was slain in battle, famously referred to as the Battle of Bauds against Norwegian Vikings near Cullen. Dub succeeded him as king due to the system of tanistry in place, but Ildulb's son, Cuilén, competed with him for the throne, and raised an army in an attempt to overthrow him.

== Battle ==
Eventually, in 965, the 2 opposing armies met in the village of Duncrub, and a battle ensued. The available details of the battle are scarce, but the Chronicle of the Kings of Alba records the deaths of 2 men: Abbot Donnchad of Dunkeld, and Mormaer Dubdon of Atholl. Dub triumphed over Cuilén, yet the internal power struggle continued until 967, when Cuilén eventually defeated Dub, and either drove him out, or slayed him.
