= Dub, King of Scotland =

King of Alba from 962 to 967

Dub
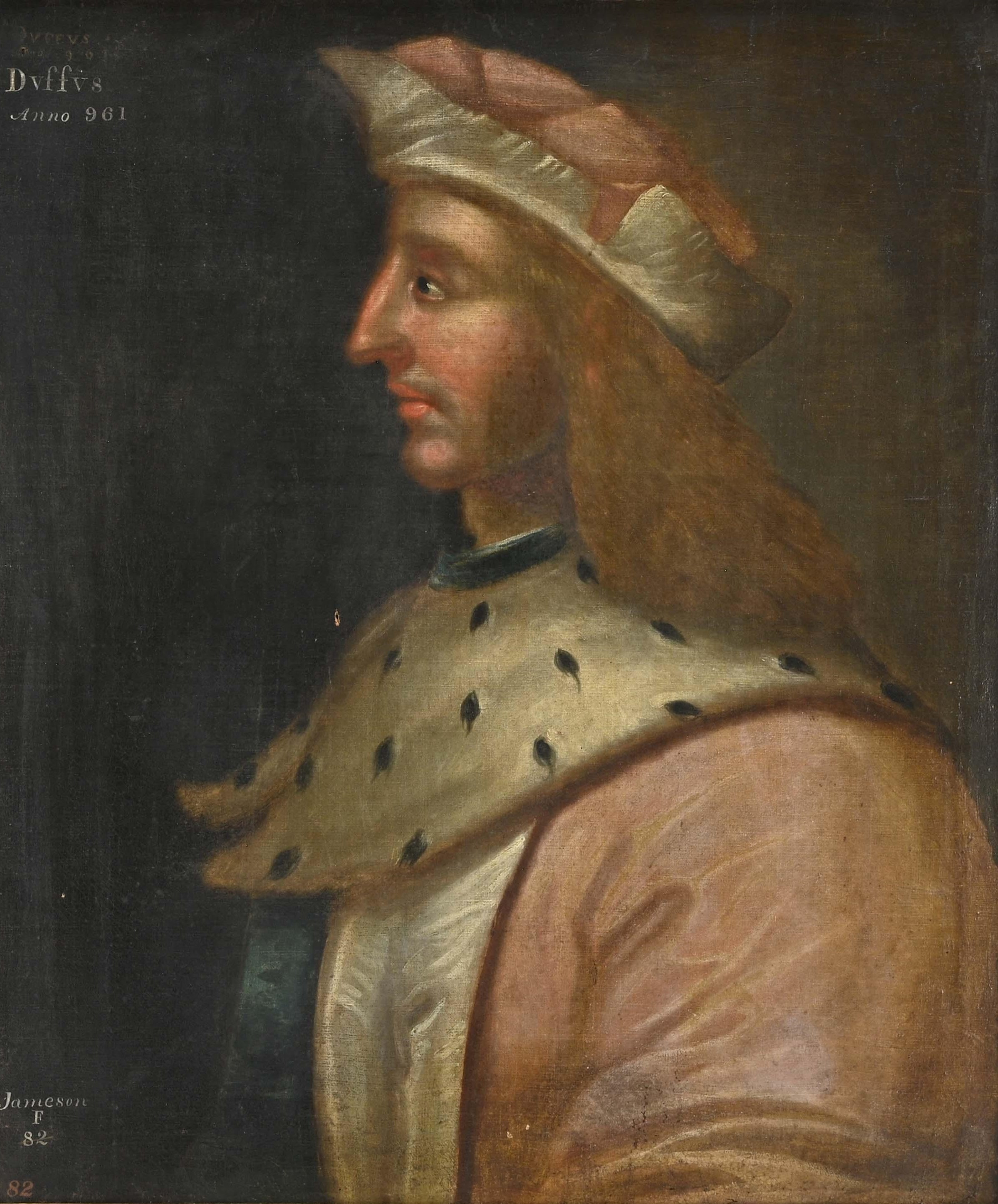
- Painting of King Dub of Scotland labeled "DVFFVS", painted by George Jamesone, made on unknown date in 1633

King of Alba (Scotland)
- Reign: 962–967
- Predecessor: Indulf
- Successor: Cuilén
- Born: c. 928
- Died: 967; Forres
- Issue: Kenneth III, King of Alba
- House: Alpin
- Father: Malcolm I, King of Alba

Dub mac Maíl Coluim (Note: Modern Gaelic: Dubh mac Mhaoil Chaluim (Scottish Gaelic pronunciation: [ˈt̪uˈmaʰkˈvɯːlˈxaɫ̪ɯm]). Dub mac Maíl Coluim is the Mediaeval Gaelic form. The modern form, Dubh, has the sense of "dark" or "black". Sometimes anglicised as Duff MacMalcolm, this form was used in older histories, but is not commonly used today.) (c. 928–967), called Dén ("the Vehement") and "the Black", was the king of Alba from 962. He was son of Malcolm I and succeeded to the throne when Indulf was killed.

While later chroniclers such as John of Fordun supplied a great deal of information on Dub's life and reign, and Hector Boece in his The history and chronicles of Scotland tell tales of witchcraft and treason, almost all of them are rejected by modern historians. There are very few sources for the reign of Dub, of which the Chronicle of the Kings of Alba and a single entry in the Annals of Ulster are the closest to contemporary.

The Chronicle records that during Dub's reign bishop Fothach, most likely bishop of St Andrews or of Dunkeld, died. The remaining report is of a battle between Dub and Cuilén, son of king Ildulb. Dub won the battle, fought "upon the ridge of Crup", in which Dunchad (Duncan), abbot of Dunkeld, sometimes supposed to be an ancestor of Crínán of Dunkeld, and Dubdon, the mormaer of Atholl, died.

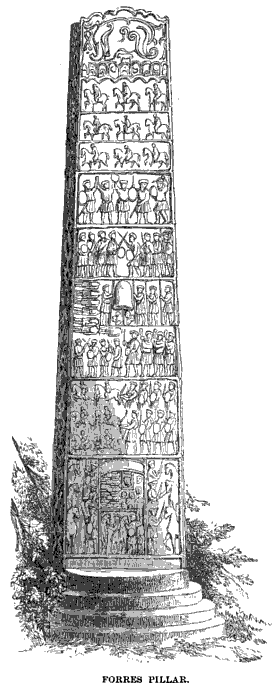
Drawing of the Sueno's Stone (1861)

The various accounts differ on what happened afterwards. The Chronicle claims that Dub was driven out of the kingdom. The Latin material interpolated in Andrew of Wyntoun's Orygynale Cronykl states that he was murdered at Forres, and links this to an eclipse of the sun which can be dated to 20 July 966. The Annals of Ulster report only: "Dub mac Maíl Coluim, king of Alba, was killed by the Scots themselves"; the usual way of reporting a death in internal strife, and place the death in 967. It has been suggested that Sueno's Stone, near Forres, may be a monument to Dub, erected by his brother Kenneth II (Cináed mac Maíl Coluim). It is presumed that Dub was killed or driven out by Cuilén, who became king after Dub's death, or by his supporters.

It is related that his body was hidden under the bridge of Kinloss, and the sun did not shine till it was found and buried. An eclipse on 10 July 967 may have originated or confirmed this story.

Dub left at least one son, Kenneth III (Cináed mac Dub). Although his descendants did not compete successfully for the kingship of Alba after Kenneth was killed in 1005, Dub is likely an ancestor of the MacDuib (MacDuff) family who held the mormaerdom, and later earldom of Fife, until 1371.

== Sources ==
- Duncan, A. A. M.; The Kingship of the Scots 842–1292: Succession and Independence, Edinburgh University Press, Edinburgh, 2002. ISBN 0-7486-1626-8
- Smyth, Alfred P.; Warlords and Holy Men: Scotland AD 80–1000, Edinburgh University Press, Edinburgh, 1984. ISBN 0-7486-0100-7

Dub, King of Scotland House of Alpin Died: 967
Regnal titles
Preceded by Indulf	King of Alba; 962–967	Succeeded by Cuilén
