= An Incident in the Rebellion of 1745 =

Painting by David Morier

- A Skirmish between some Highlanders and English Infantry, The Battle of Culloden
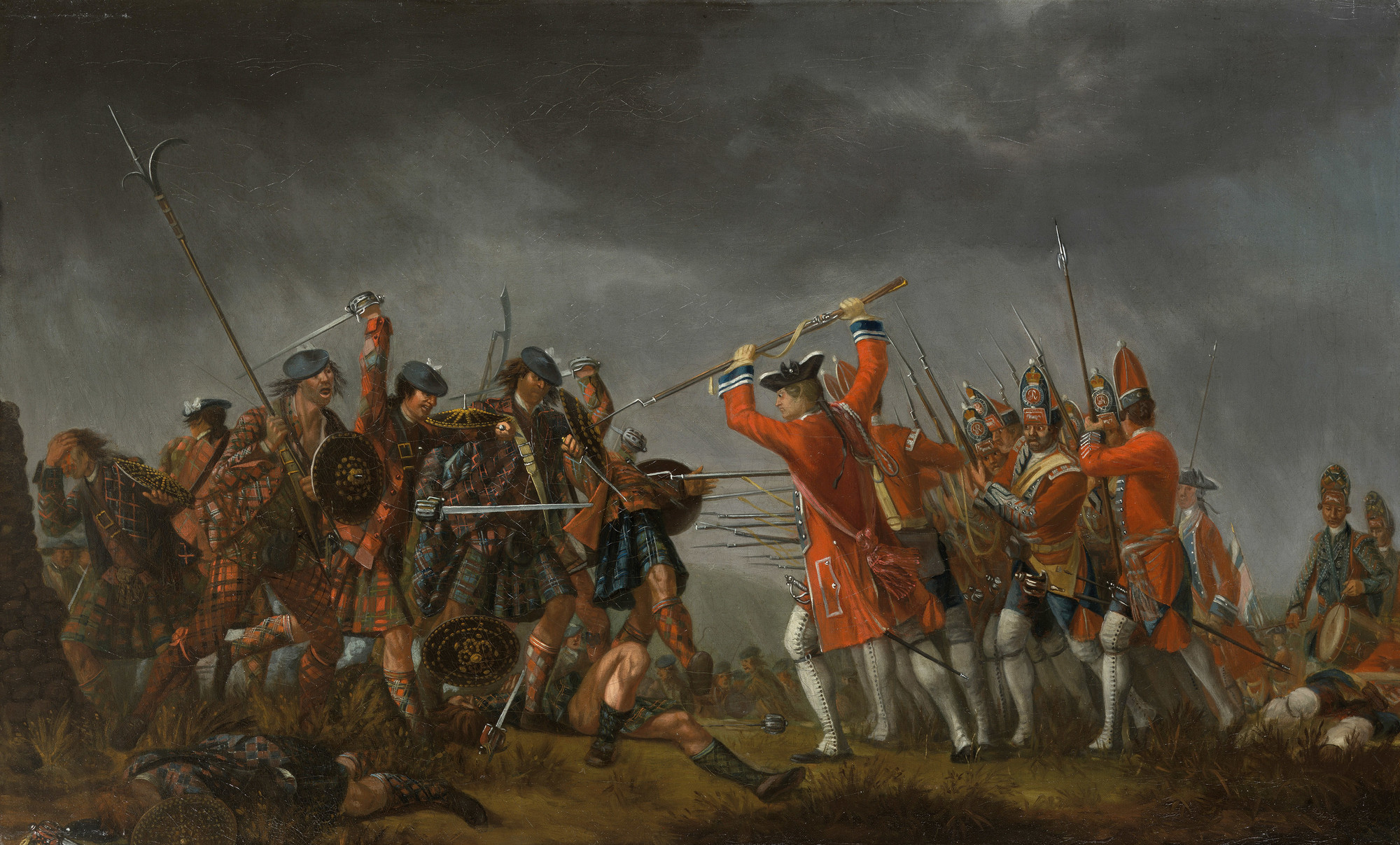
- Artist: David Morier
- Year: 1746–1765
- Medium: Oil-on-canvas
- Subject: A battle between Jacobite and British government soldiers.
- Dimensions: 60.5 cm × 99.5 cm (23.8 in × 39.2 in)
- Location: Palace of Holyroodhouse, Edinburgh
- Owner: Royal Collection
- Accession: RCIN 401243

An Incident in the Rebellion of 1745 is an oil painting painted by Swiss-born artist David Morier sometime between 1746 and 1765. It is currently part of the art collection of the British royal family. The painting depicts a scene during the 1746 Battle of Culloden, in which a group of Jacobite Army troops charge against a line of British government soldiers.

== Background ==
The Battle of Culloden was the last battle of the Jacobite rising of 1745. This rising was an attempt by Charles Edward Stuart to overthrow George II of the House of Hanover, and replace him with his father, James Francis Edward Stuart of the House of Stuart. The battle was fought on 16 April 1746, on Drummossie Moor near Inverness in the Scottish Highlands. The Jacobite Army was commanded by Charles Stuart and the government army led by Prince William, Duke of Cumberland, the son of George II. The battle lasted around an hour and resulted in a decisive defeat for the Jacobites.

== Painting ==
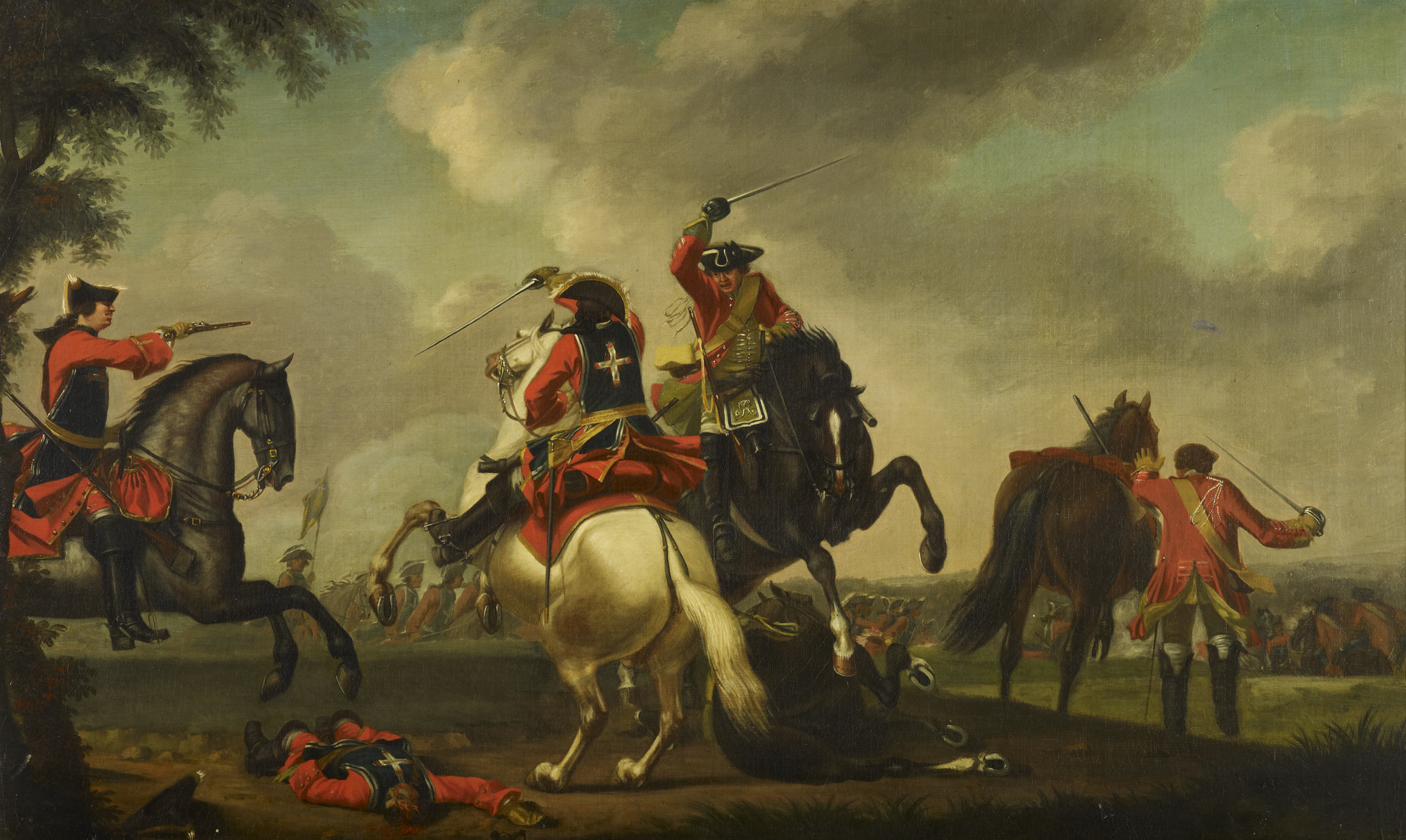
A Skirmish Between English and French Cavalry, c.1760. Another of the four battle-scene paintings that Morier painted for Cumberland

Swiss-born artist David Morier began working for the Duke of Cumberland in 1747, and continued to receive payments from him until 1767. At an unknown date before 1765 he completed An Incident in the Rebellion of 1745. (Note: Many sources state the painting was completed soon after the battle. But details of the soldiers' uniforms suggest the painting was done in the 1750s. Possibly in 1753 when the regiment depicted was stationed near London. The painting is listed in a 1765 inventory of Cumberland's paintings, described as A Skirmish between some Highlanders and English Infantry) The painting is thought to be one of a set of four similar-sized paintings of battle scenes that Morier painted for Cumberland in the 1750s or 1760s. (Note: The other paintings in the group are Hussars Attacking a Baggage Wagon c. 1755–65, A Skirmish between English and French Cavalry c. 1760, and An Engagement between French Troops and a Detachment of the Dutch "Free Company" c. 1760. All are owned by the Royal Collection.)

Morier may have been present at the Battle of Culloden. Many sources state he used Jacobite prisoners as models, but this is disputed, and claimed to be a legend that arose in the 19th century.

The painting is unusual for the time in its close-up portrayal of violent hand-to-hand combat between two groups of ordinary soldiers. Battle paintings of the era typically focused on the commanding general, with a broad view of the battle taking place in the distant background. Morier produced another painting of the Battle of Culloden that is of this type, Portrait of the Duke of Cumberland at Culloden. This is owned by National Museums Scotland and now hangs in the National War Museum in Edinburgh Castle.

=== The Jacobite soldiers ===
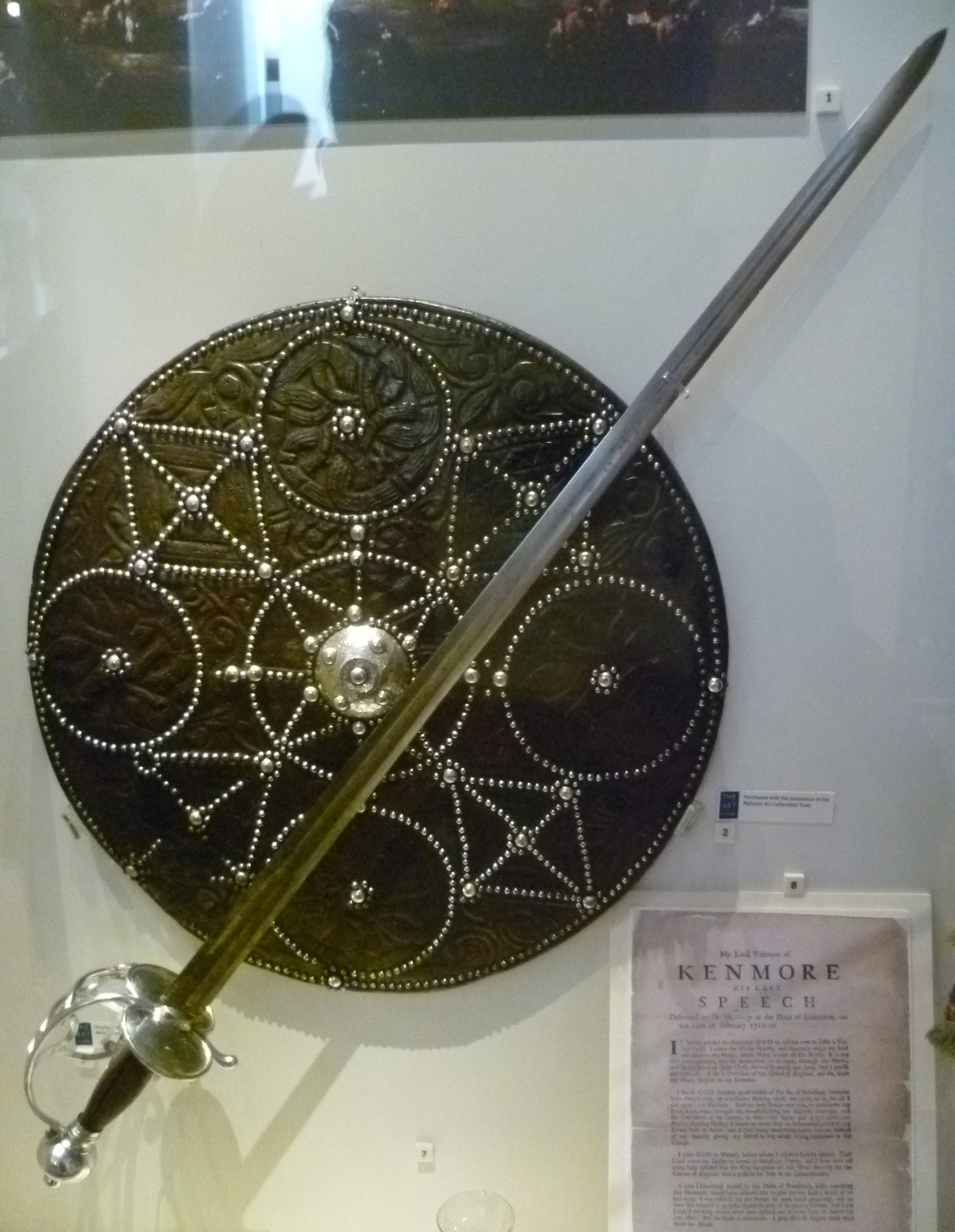
A targe and broadsword that date from the 1715 Jacobite Rebellion, National Museum of Scotland

The eight Jacobite soldiers wear 20 different tartans between them. This served as a reflection of the diverse amounts of Scottish clans which contributed troops, many of whom were conscripted, towards the Jacobite cause. The wearing of tartans would go on to be proscribed in the Dress Act 1746, though this was poorly enforced. (Note: Tartan clothing was not confined to Jacobites. Some government regiments, such as Loudon's Highlanders, included tartans in their uniforms. Government troops also included units of Independent Highland Companies, who were not given uniforms and wore traditional Highland clothing similar to their Jacobite counterparts. Likewise, some soldiers in the Jacobite Army, such as the Irish picquets, wore red-coated uniforms similar to those worn by government soldiers.) They also wear white cockades in their bonnets, which show their allegiance to the Stuart cause.

The Jacobite troops depicted are armed with outdated weaponry – none carry firearms, instead being armed with broadswords, dirks, and targes (shields). Some are carrying Lochaber axes, an obsolete type of Scottish poleaxe. This may reflect Hanoverian anti-Jacobite propaganda, which sought to portray the Jacobite Highlanders as barbaric, backward and savage.

The Jacobites had been poorly armed at the start of the rising, due to the Disarming Act 1715. But by the time of Culloden, France and Spain had supplied them with around 5,000 modern muskets and bayonets. Some Jacobite troops carried captured Brown Bess muskets or Scottish-made pistols. It is known that all Jacobite Army soldiers were eventually armed with muskets, but some employed the tactic of firing one shot, then dropping their firearm to engage in hand-to-hand combat with their broadswords and dirks. This tactic was known as the Highland charge; James Ray, who was present during the battle on the government side, wrote in his later book that this happened in the fighting the painting depicts.

=== The government soldiers ===
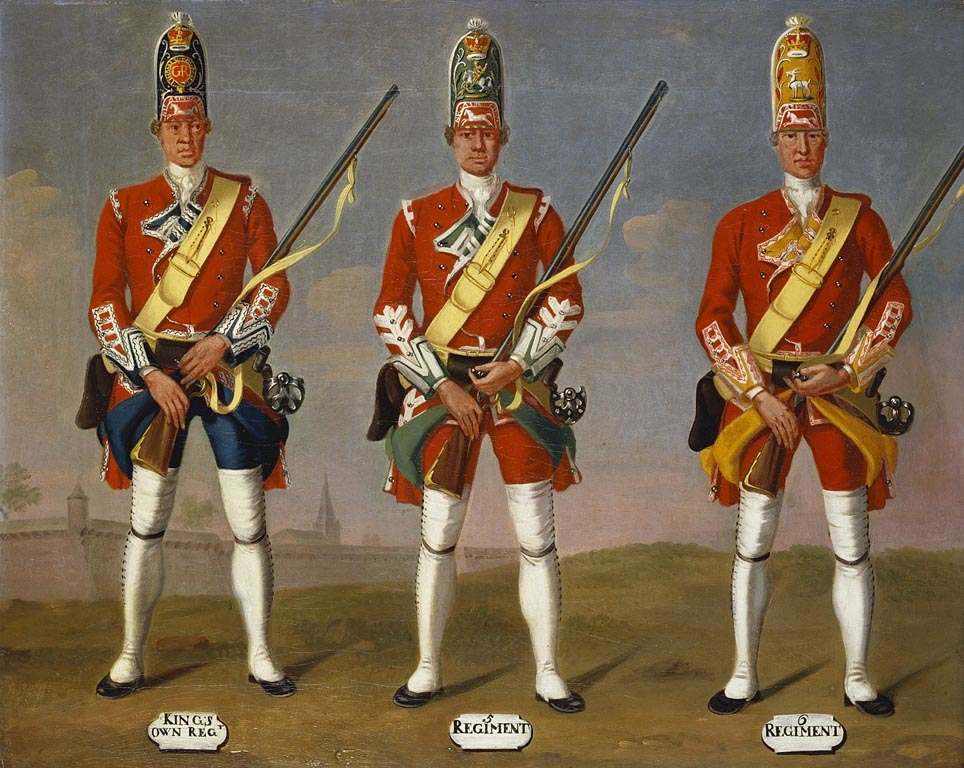
c. 1751 painting by Morier of three British grenadiers; the grenadier on the left is from the same regiment depicted in the painting

The government troops depicted are grenadiers of William Barrell's Regiment of Foot. (Note: At the time, regiments were known by the name of their colonel. In this case, Lieutenant-General William Barrell had the honorary position of colonel of the regiment; he was not present at Culloden.) The regiment had fought the Jacobites three months earlier at the Battle of Falkirk Muir. At Culloden, it fought on the left flank of the government army, at the southern end of the battlefield, and took the brunt of the Jacobite charge – it suffered the heaviest casualties on the government side, with 18 killed and 108 wounded out of 373 total casualties suffered by government forces. Regimental commander Robert Rich was among the wounded, losing his left hand.

The soldiers can be identified as grenadiers by the mitre caps they wear, and would be the regiment's tallest, strongest and most experienced men. The most prominent soldier, nearest the viewer, wears a red sash that indicates he is an officer. He is armed with a fusil – a smaller, lighter version of the muskets carried by his men. This was usual for grenadier officers; other officers carried a short pike or spontoon. Lord Robert Kerr was captain of the regiment's grenadier company and was killed during the battle. This officer, in a prominent and heroic pose, may be intended as a depiction of him.

Behind the unit, drummers, another officer and more soldiers can be seen, as well as part of the King's Colour, one of the regiment's flags. (Note: The flag depicted still survives and is part of the collection of the National Museum of Scotland)

=== Background of the painting ===
Two walled farm enclosures were features of the southern end of the battlefield, where The King's Own regiment fought. A small part of a stone structure may be seen in the left of the painting, which may be part of one of the enclosures.

== Location ==
The painting now hangs in the lobby of the Palace of Holyroodhouse. The room contains a number of items associated with the 1745 rising. These include portraits of James Francis Edward Stuart and the Duke of Cumberland. There is a late-19th century, historical painting of Charles Edward Stuart, a knife and fork that are known to have belonged to him, and a sword and pistols that were traditionally said to have belonged to him.

A later engraving based on the painting is the collections of the Scottish National Gallery.
