= Dubdon of Atholl =

Dubdon of Atholl (fl. 960s) was Mormaer of Atholl (satrapas Athochlach) during the reign of King Dub of Scotland. The Chronicle of the Kings of Alba says that Dubdon was killed along with Abbot Dúnchad of Dunkeld in the battle of Dorsum Crup, fought between Dub and Cuilén, in which the former was victorious. Both the fact that Dubdon died in the battle, and that his power base was firmly in the south of the Kingdom of Alba, suggest strongly that he had been the ally of Cuilén and enemy of Dub.

== Bibliography ==
- Anderson, Alan Orr, Early Sources of Scottish History: AD 500-1286, 2 Vols, (Edinburgh, 1922), vol. i, p. 472, n. 2.

Preceded by ?	Mormaer of Atholl d. 960s	Succeeded by ?
