= Sueno's Stone =

Large ancient stone marker in Scotland

Coordinates: 57.6157°N 3.5977°W

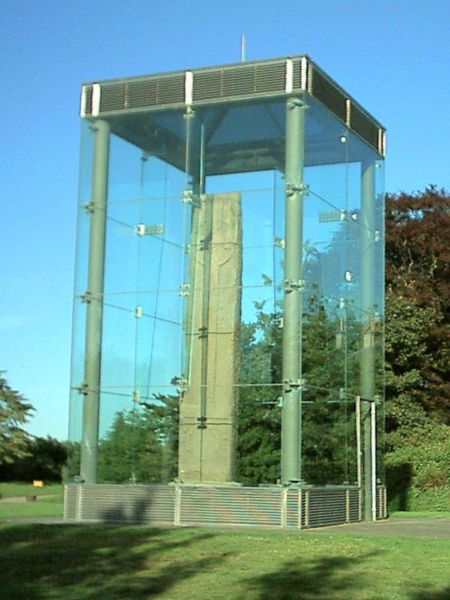
- Sueno's Stone in Forres
- Material: Old Yellow Sandstone
- Size: 6.5 metres (21 ft)
- Symbols: Celtic cross with interlaced knotwork; Battle scene
- Created: c. 850–950
- Present location: Forres, Moray
- Classification: Class III
- Culture: Picto-Scottish

Sueno's Stone is a Picto-Scottish Class III standing stone on the north-easterly edge of Forres in Moray and is the largest surviving Pictish style cross-slab stone of its type in Scotland, standing 6.5 metres (21 feet) in height. It is situated on a raised bank on a now isolated section of the former road to Findhorn. The stone is named after Sweyn Forkbeard, but this association has been challenged and it has also been associated with the killing of King Dubh mac Ailpin in Forres in 966. The stone was erected c. 850–950 but by whom and for what, is unknown.

== Possible second pillar ==
Evidence from Timothy Pont's Mapp of Murray (c. 1590), the more modern military maps of Roy and Ainslie (1750 and 1789 respectively) and Robert Campbell's map of 1790 all show Sueno's Stone along with another stone that has now disappeared. The fact that Pont's map shows the standing stones indicates their size as Pont does not show any other obelisks anywhere. Ainslie has inscribed on his map "two curiously carved pillars". The fact that these maps show the pillar(s) in their present (at least approximate) position belies the notion that it was found elsewhere and re-erected at its present location.

James Ray, who fought on the British government side during the Jacobite rising of 1745, describes seeing a single stone as the government army marched past the area, just days prior to the Battle of Culloden.

Hector Boece (c. 1465–1536) (not known entirely for his historical accuracy) mentions the stone and attributes it to Sueno. Lady Ann Campbell, the Countess of Moray, is noted in the early 18th century as maintaining the stone in an attempt to stabilise it. This was achieved by constructing stepped plinths around the base and can be seen today. Archaeological excavations carried out in 1990 and 1991 suggest that it may originally have been one of two monumental stones.

== Description ==
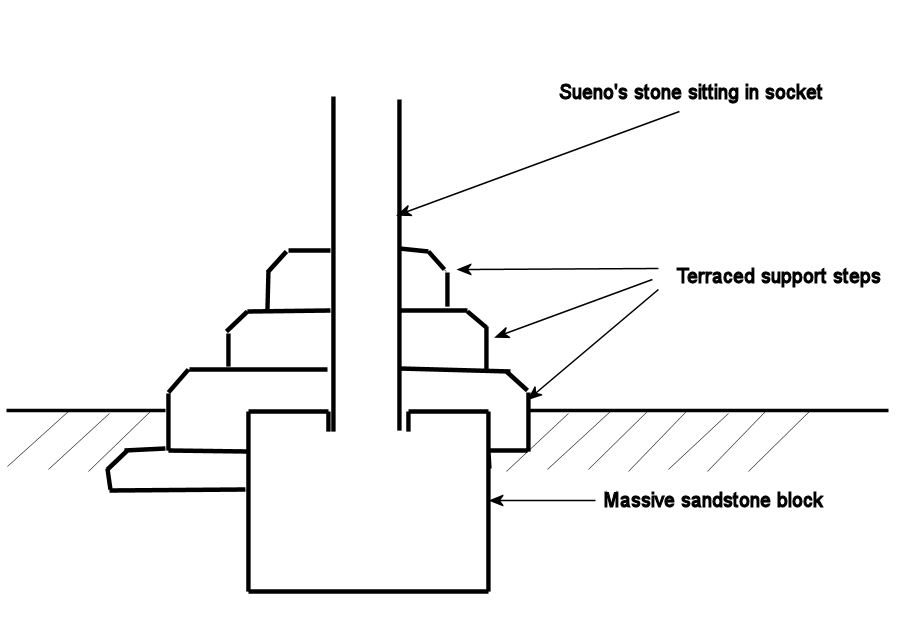
Details of base of stone

Sueno's Stone is an upright cross-slab with typical Pictish-style interwoven knotwork on the edge panels. It is carved from local yellow sandstone, prevalent in Moray but has suffered considerable weathering in places. The west face has a carved Celtic cross with elaborately interlaced decoration and a poorly preserved figural scene (perhaps a royal inauguration) set in a panel below the cross. The east face has four panels that show a large battle scene. The top panel is quite weathered and shows rows of horsemen. The second panel depicts armed foot soldiers and the third panel shows the decapitated vanquished soldiers, the heads piled up, and soldiers, archers and horsemen surrounding what may be a broch. The base panel depicts the victorious army leaving the battlefield. The sides are also elaborately carved. In the early 1990s, the stone was encased in armoured glass to prevent further erosion.

== Interpretations ==
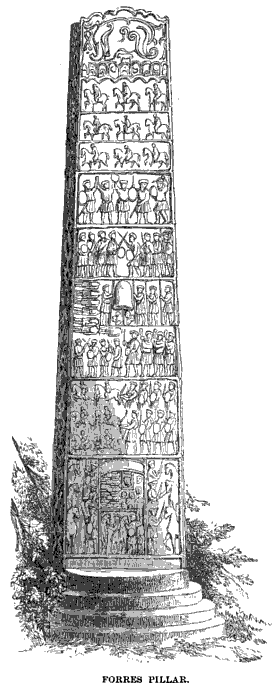
1861 drawing of the stone

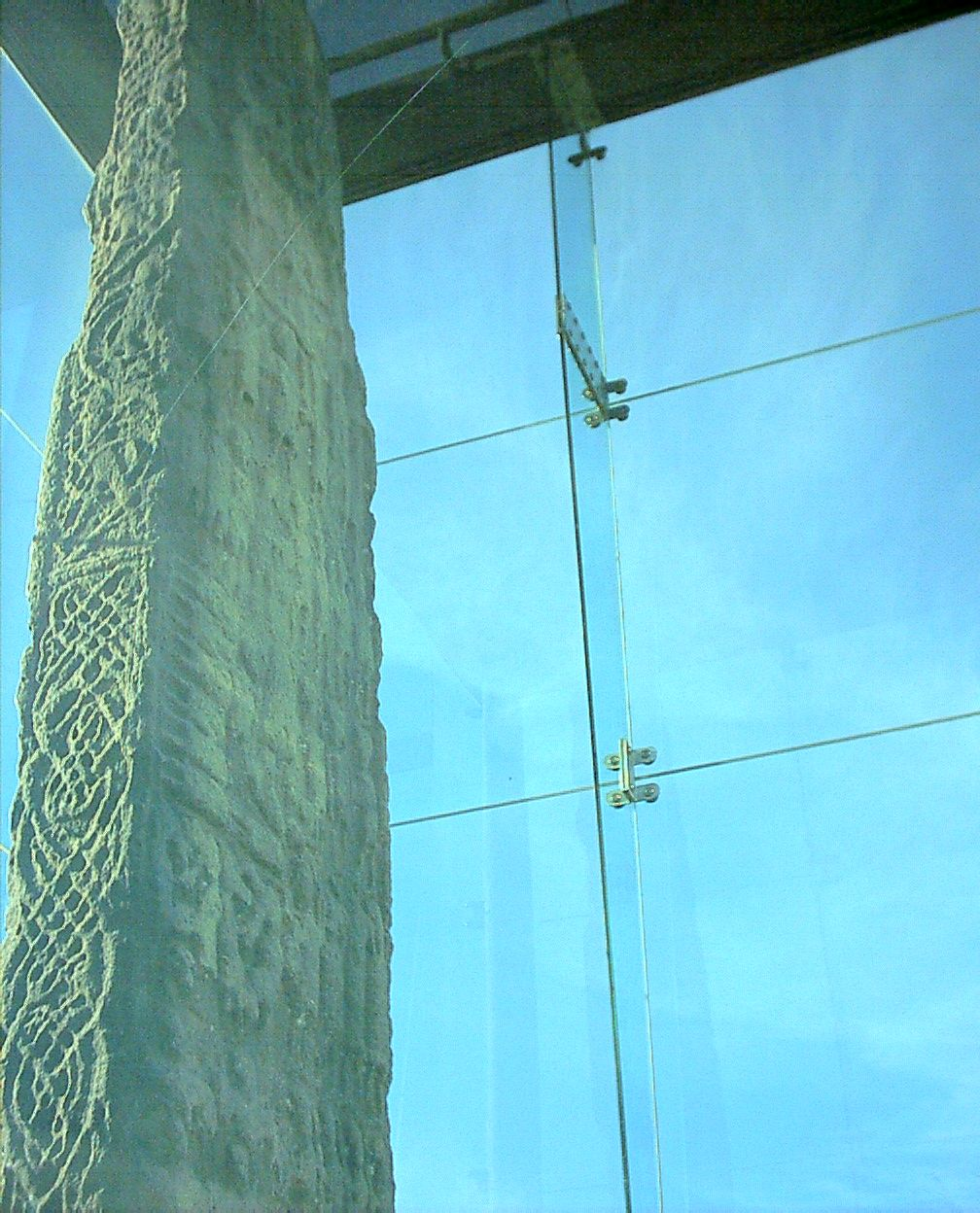
Side panel with sinuous vine patterns

Radiocarbon dating at the site produced dates of charcoal fragments between AD 600 and AD 1000. Two similar patterns were discerned and may relate to the second stone. There is general agreement that the stone dates to c. 850–890. and greater accuracy is probably not possible. The examination of the carvings has been carried out to compare the style and also to interpret the figurative and historical significance. The Irish crosses of the 10th century are similar with their interweaving patterns and crowded panels of figures.

=== Martial imagery ===
Some scholars have cautioned against reading the scenes on Pictish cross-slabs as depictions of real events. However, one hypothesis is that the figures depicted in the battle, parade and decapitation scenes are the army of Kenneth MacAlpin (Cináed mac Ailpín), the scene being the representation of Kenneth's demonstration of his military and legal authority over northern Pictland. The two side panels have sinuous vine patterns populated with men as depicted in the Book of Kells. This suggests a date of between AD 800 and AD 900. The traditional interpretation of the battle scene was that it shows a victory by Malcolm II (Máel Coluim mac Cináeda) (reigned 1005–1034) against Danes or Norse led by one Sueno. This appears in Alexander Gordon's Itinerarium Septentrionale of 1726 and is thought to have been ancient then, derived from folklore and the more learned histories of John of Fordun, Hector Boece and George Buchanan. However, this interpretation is no longer supported by historians and archaeologists.

Several more recent interpretations have been advanced. Anthony Jackson suggested that the stone displayed the final triumph of the Christian Gaels of Dál Riata over their (erroneously) heathen, Pictish enemies, in which case it would have been erected by Kenneth MacAlpin or his immediate successors. As an alternative, Archie Duncan advances his theory that the stone records the defeat, death and reburial of Dubh mac Ailpin in 966. A modified form of Jackson's theory, stripped of much of the ingenious interpretation, holds that Sueno's Stone commemorates an unknown victory by the men of Alba, the Gaelicised Picts of the lands south of the Mounth over the men of Moray, those of the lands north of the Mounth.

Most recently, it has been suggested that the stone's martial imagery as a whole may relate to a contemporary battle between Picts and Vikings. This interpretation is supported by blade scores on the base of the cross-slab, which reinforce the stone’s connection with a real contemporary battle. Images of the slaughter of a horse on the east face, and of a dog-like quadruped on the north face, evoke ritual animal sacrifice of the kind found in early medieval Scandinavia. It is also possible that the conical object in the centre of the east face may represent a furnace used to burn the bodies of defeated Vikings.

== Legend ==
Local legend says this was the crossroads where Macbeth originally met the three witches. In the legend, they were eventually imprisoned inside the stone but should the stone be broken they would be released. However, this tale can date no further back than Shakespeare's play.

Another legend suggests that the stone was erected for King Dubh mac Ailpin. The Annals of Ulster reported "Dub mac Maíl Coluim (mac Ailpin), king of Alba, was killed by the Scots themselves"; the usual way of reporting a death in internal strife, and placing the death in 966. It has been suggested that Sueno's Stone, near Forres, may be a monument to Dub, erected by his brother Kenneth II (Cináed mac Maíl Coluim). It is presumed that Dub was killed or driven out by Cuilén, who became king after Dub's death, or by his supporters.
