= James Ray (writer) =

British soldier and writer

James Ray (fl. 1745 – 1746) was a British soldier and writer best known for his written accounts of the Jacobite rising of 1745. Ray was born in Whitehaven, Cumberland. During the rebellion, he went to join the British Army at Carlisle in autumn 1745 as the Jacobite army under Charles Edward Stuart was marching south from Edinburgh to invade England. However, Jacobite forces captured Carlisle on 15 November before Ray arrived to the city, and he proceeded to follow Stuart's 9,000-strong army as it marched south and reached Derby on 4 December. Stuart decided to retreat back to Scotland on 5 December after calling a council of war in Derby, and Ray met government troops under Prince William, Duke of Cumberland at Stafford a month later on 5 January 1746.

Ray reported all the information he had collected on the Jacobites to Cumberland and joined the British army, marching north with them to Scotland and participating in the decisive battle of Culloden on 16 April, which saw Cumberland's troops conclusively defeat the Jacobite army. He then left the British army and proceeded to publish The acts of the rebels, written by an Egyptian, a first-hand account of the rebellion. In 1749, Ray published A Compleat History of the Rebellion: From Its First Rise in 1745, to Its Total Suppression at the Glorious Battle of Culloden, in April 1746, which was printed by John Jackson of York.
