= Scotland in the Early Middle Ages =

Scotland was divided into a series of kingdoms in the Early Middle Ages, i.e. between the end of Roman authority in southern and central Britain from around 400 AD and the rise of the kingdom of Alba in 900 AD. Of these, the four most important to emerge were the Picts, the Gaels of Dál Riata, the Britons of Alt Clut, and the Anglian kingdom of Bernicia. After the arrival of the Vikings in the late 8th century, Scandinavian rulers and colonies were established on the islands and along parts of the coasts. In the 9th century, the House of Alpin combined the lands of the Scots and Picts to form a single kingdom which constituted the basis of the Kingdom of Scotland.

Scotland has an extensive coastline, vast areas of difficult terrain and poor agricultural land. In this period, more land became marginal due to climate change, resulting in relatively light human settlement, particularly in the interior and Highlands. Northern Britain lacked urban centres and settlements were based on farmsteads and around fortified positions such as brochs, with mixed farming primarily based on self-sufficiency. In this period, changes in settlement and colonisation meant that the Pictish and Brythonic languages began to be subsumed by Gaelic, Scots, and, at the end of the period, by Old Norse. Life expectancy was relatively low, leading to a young population, with a ruling aristocracy, freemen, and relatively large numbers of slaves. Kingship was multi-layered, with different kings surrounded by their warbands that made up the most important elements of armed forces, and who engaged in both low-level raiding and occasional longer-range, major campaigns.

Some highly distinctive monumental and ornamental art, culminating in the development of the Insular art style, are common across Britain and Ireland. The most impressive structures included nucleated hill forts and, after the introduction of Christianity, churches and monasteries. The period also saw the beginnings of Scottish literature in British, Old English, Gaelic and Latin languages.

== Sources ==
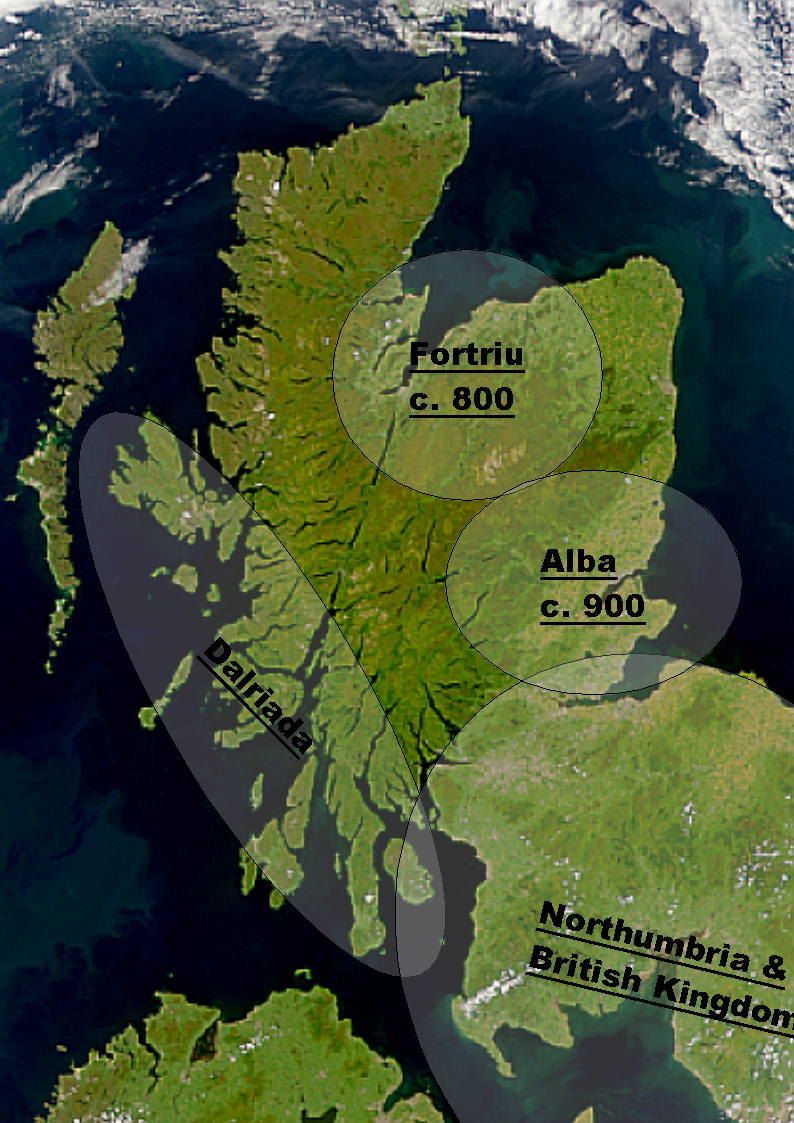
Major political centres in early Medieval Scotland

As the first half of the period is largely prehistoric, archaeology plays an important part in studies of early Medieval Scotland. There are no significant contemporary internal sources for the Picts, although evidence has been gleaned from lists of kings, annals preserved in Wales and Ireland and from sources written down much later, which may draw on oral traditions or earlier sources. From the 7th century there is documentary evidence from Latin sources including the lives of saints, such as Adomnán's Life of St. Columba, and Bede's Ecclesiastical History of the English People. Archaeological sources include settlements, art, and surviving everyday objects. Other aids to understanding in this period include onomastics (the study of names) – divided into toponymy (place-names), showing the movement of languages, and the sequence in which different languages were spoken in an area, and anthroponymy (personal names), which can offer clues to relationships and origins.

== History ==
By the time of Bede and Adomnán, in the late seventh century and early eighth century, four major circles of influence had emerged in northern Britain. In the east were the Picts, whose kingdoms eventually stretched from the river Forth to Shetland. In the west were the Gaelic (Goidelic)-speaking people of Dál Riata with their royal fortress at Dunadd in Argyll, with close links with the island of Ireland, from which they brought with them the name "Scots", originally a term for the inhabitants of Ireland. In the south was the British (Brythonic) Kingdom of Alt Clut, descendants of the peoples of the Roman-influenced kingdoms of "The Old North". Finally, there were the English or "Angles", Germanic invaders who had overrun much of southern Britain and held the Kingdom of Bernicia (later the northern part of Northumbria), in the south-east, and who brought with them Old English.

=== Picts ===
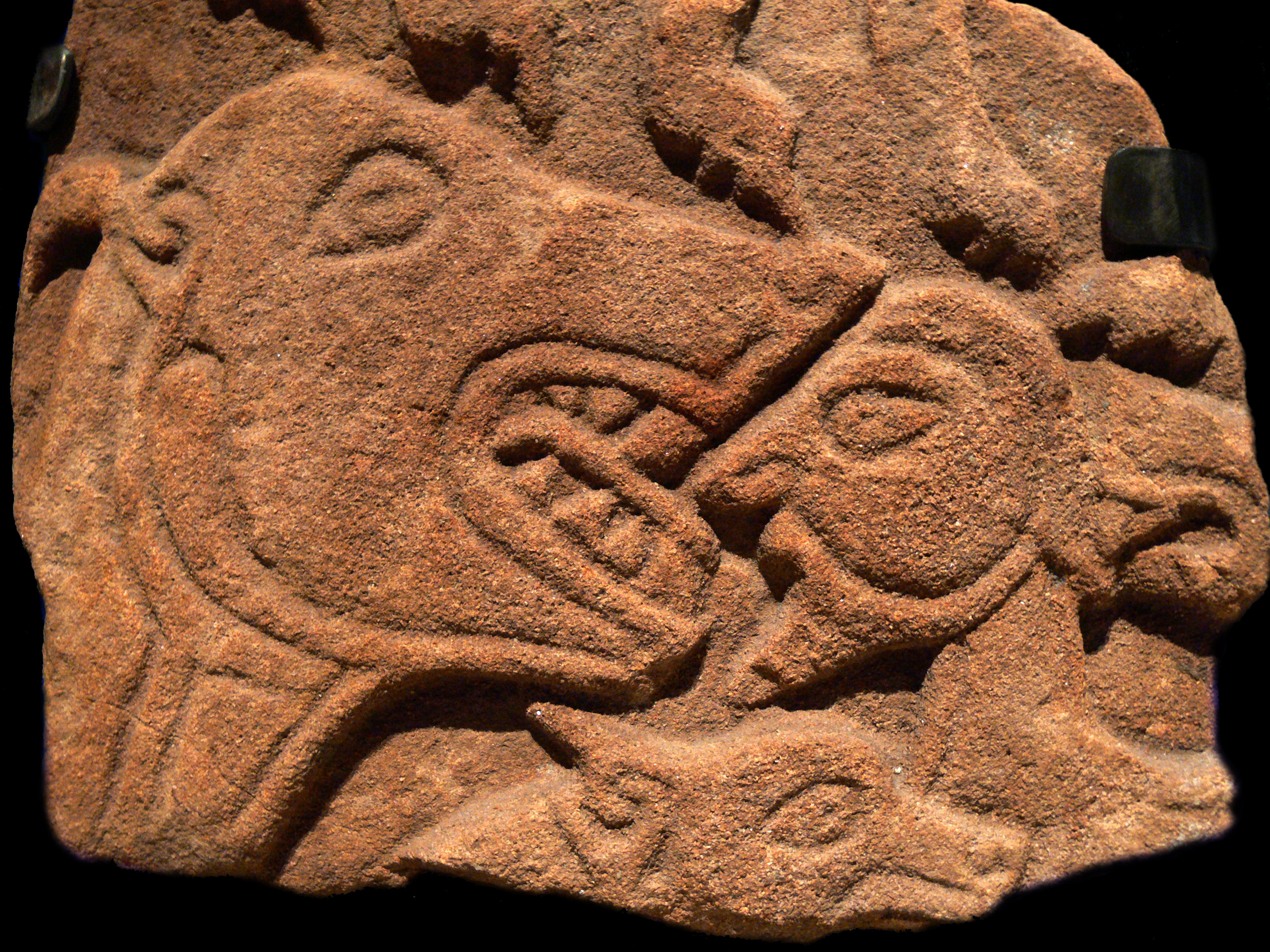
The so-called Daniel Stone, Pictish cross slab fragment found at Rosemarkie, Easter Ross

The confederation of Pictish tribes that developed north of the Firth of Forth may have stretched up as far as Orkney. It probably developed out of the tribes of the Caledonii (whose name continued to be used for at least part of the confederation), perhaps as a response to the pressure exerted by the presence of the Romans to the south. They first appear in Roman records at the end of the 3rd century as the picti (the painted people: possibly a reference to their habit of tattooing their bodies) when Roman forces campaigned against them. The first identifiable king of the Picts, who seems to have exerted a superior and wide-ranging authority, was Bridei mac Maelchon (r. c. 550–84). His power was based in the kingdom of Fidach, and his base was at the fort of Craig Phadrig, near modern Inverness. After his death, leadership seems to have shifted to the Fortriu, whose lands were centred on Moray and Easter Ross and who raided along the eastern coast into modern England. Christian missionaries from Iona appear to have begun the conversion of the Picts to Christianity from 563.

In the 7th century, the Picts acquired Bridei map Beli (671–693) as a king, perhaps imposed by the kingdom of Alt Clut, where his father Beli I and then his brother Eugein I ruled. At this point the Anglo-Saxon kingdom of Bernicia was expanding northwards, and the Picts were probably tributary to them until, in 685, Bridei defeated them at the Battle of Dunnichen in Angus, killing their king, Ecgfrith. In the reign of Óengus mac Fergusa (729–761), the Picts appear to have reached the height of their influence, defeating the forces of Dál Riata (and probably making them a tributary), invading Alt Clut and Northumbria, and making the first known peace treaties with the English. Succeeding Pictish kings may have been able to dominate Dál Riata, with Caustantín mac Fergusa (793–820) perhaps placing his son Domnall on the throne from 811.

=== Dál Riata ===
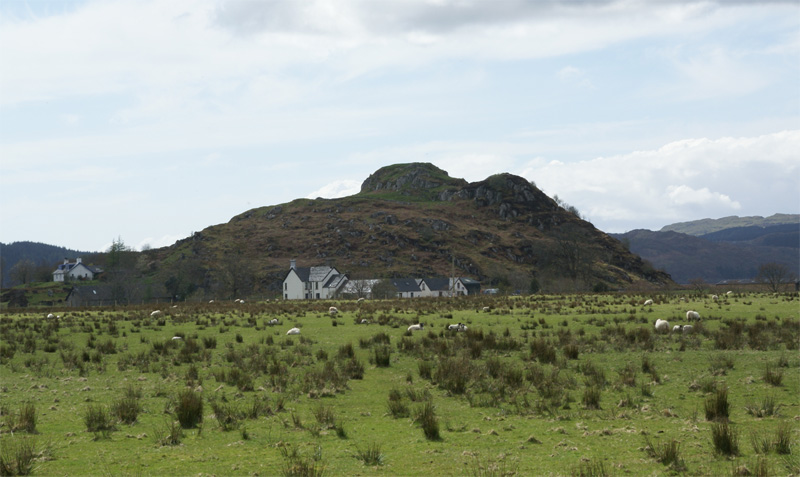
Dunadd Fort, Kilmartin Glen, probably the centre of the kingdom of Dál Riata

The Gaelic overkingdom of Dál Riata was on the western coast of modern Scotland, with some territory on the northern coasts of Ireland. It probably ruled from the fortress of Dunadd, now near Kilmartin in Argyll and Bute. In the late 6th and early 7th centuries, it encompassed roughly what is now Argyll and Bute and Lochaber in Scotland, and also County Antrim in Ireland. Dál Riata is commonly viewed as having been an Irish Gaelic colony in Scotland, although some archaeologists have recently argued against this. The inhabitants of Dál Riata are often referred to as Scots, from Latin scotti, a name used by Latin writers for the inhabitants of Ireland. Its original meaning is uncertain, but it later refers to Gaelic-speakers, whether from Ireland or elsewhere.

In 563, a mission from Ireland under St. Columba founded the monastery of Iona off the west coast of Scotland, and probably began the conversion of the region to Christianity. The kingdom reached its height under Áedán mac Gabráin (r. 574–608), but its expansion was checked at the Battle of Degsastan in 603 by Æthelfrith of Northumbria. Serious defeats in Ireland and Scotland in the time of Domnall Brecc (d. 642) ended Dál Riata's golden age, and the kingdom became a client of Northumbria, then a subject to the Picts. There is disagreement over the fate of the kingdom from the late 8th century onwards. Some scholars argue that Dál Riata underwent a revival under king Áed Find (736–78), before the arrival of the Vikings.

=== Alt Clut ===
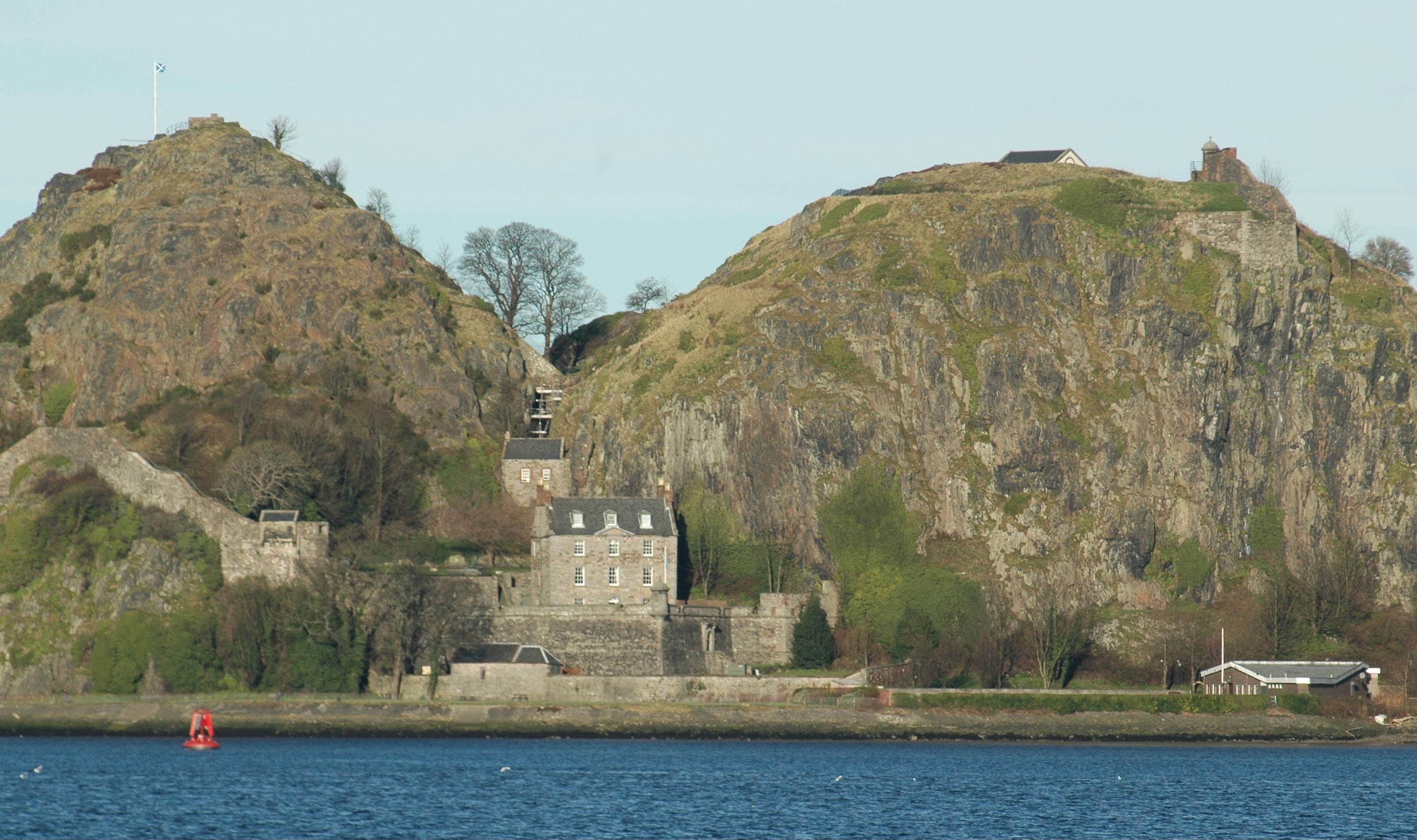
Looking north at Dumbarton Rock, 'fort of the Britons', the chief fort of Strathclyde from the 6th century to 870 when it was taken by the Vikings

The kingdom of Alt Clut took its name from the Northern Brittonic for 'rock of the Clyde', today's Dumbarton Rock, which derives from the Gaelic for 'fort of the Britons'.

The kingdom may have had its origins with the Damnonii people of Ptolemy's Geographia. Two kings are known from near-contemporary sources in this early period. The first is Coroticus or Ceretic (Ceredig), known as the recipient of a letter from Saint Patrick, and stated by a 7th-century biographer to have been king of the Height of the Clyde, Dumbarton Rock, placing him in the second half of the 5th century. From Patrick's letter it is clear that Ceretic was a Christian, and it is likely that the ruling class of the area were also Christians, at least in name. His descendant Rhydderch Hael is named in Adomnán's Life of Saint Columba.

After 600, information on the Britons of Alt Clut becomes more common in the sources. In 642, led by Eugein son of Beli, they defeated the men of Dál Riata and killed Domnall Brecc, grandson of Áedán, at Strathcarron. The kingdom suffered a number of attacks from the Picts under Óengus, and later the Picts' Northumbrian allies between 744 and 756. They lost the region of Kyle in the southwest of modern Scotland to Northumbria, and the last attack may have forced the king Dumnagual III to submit to his neighbours. After this, little is heard of Alt Clut or its kings until Alt Clut was besieged and captured by Vikings in 870, at which point the Clyde Britons seem to have reconstituted a kingdom based on a centre at Partick and the Clyde Britons' existing Christian centre at Govan, home of The Govan Stones.

=== Bernicia ===
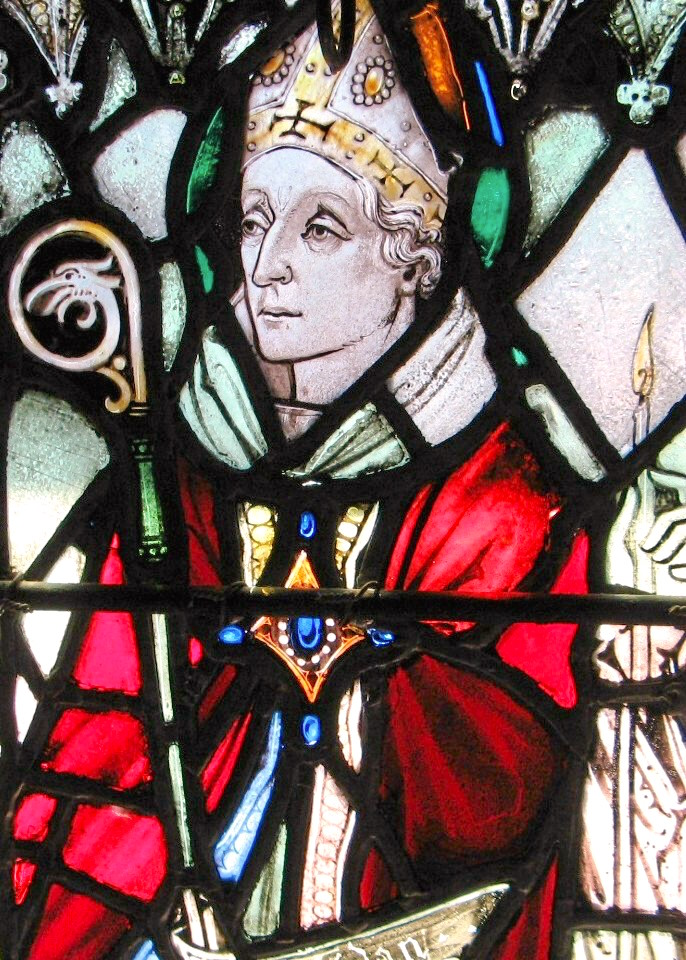
St. Aidan, founder of Lindisfarne Priory

The Brythonic successor states of what is now the modern Anglo-Scottish border region are referred to by Welsh scholars as part of Yr Hen Ogledd ("The Old North"). This included the kingdoms of Bryneich, which may have had its capital at modern Bamburgh in Northumberland, and Gododdin, centred on Din Eidyn (what is now Edinburgh) and stretching across modern Lothian. Some "Angles" may have been employed as mercenaries along Hadrian's Wall during the late Roman period. Others are thought to have migrated north (by sea) from Deira (Old English: Dere) in the early 6th century. At some point the Angles took control of Bryneich, which became the Anglo-Saxon kingdom of Bernicia (Old English: Beornice). The first Anglo-Saxon king in the historical record is Ida, who is said to have obtained the throne around 547. Around 600, the Gododdin raised a force of about 300 men to assault the Anglo-Saxon stronghold of Catraeth, perhaps Catterick, North Yorkshire. The battle, which ended disastrously for the Britons, was memorialised in the poem Y Gododdin.

Ida's grandson, Æthelfrith, united Deira with his own kingdom, killing its king Æthelric to form Northumbria around 604. Ætherlric's son returned to rule both kingdoms after Æthelfrith had been defeated and killed by the East Anglians in 616, presumably bringing with him the Christianity to which he had converted while in exile. After his defeat and death at the hands of the Welsh and Mercians at the Battle of Hatfield Chase on 12 October 633, Northumbria again was divided into two kingdoms under pagan kings. Oswald (r. 634–42), (another son of Æthelfrith) defeated the Welsh and appears to have been recognised by both Bernicians and Deirans as king of a united Northumbria. He had converted to Christianity while in exile in Dál Riata and looked to Iona for missionaries, rather than to Canterbury. The island monastery of Lindisfarne was founded in 635 by the Irish monk Saint Aidan, who had been sent from Iona at the request of King Oswald. It became the seat of the Bishop of Lindisfarne, which stretched across Northumbria. In 638 Edinburgh was attacked by the English and at this point, or soon after, the Gododdin territories in Lothian and around Stirling came under the rule of Bernicia. After Oswald's death fighting the Mercians, the two kingdoms were divided again, with Deira possibly having sub-kings under Bernician authority, but from this point the English kings were Christian and after the Synod of Whitby in 664, the Northumbrian kings accepted the primacy of Canterbury and Rome. In the late 7th century, the Northumbrians extended their influence north of the Forth, until they were defeated by the Picts at the Battle of Nechtansmere in 685.

=== Vikings and the Kingdom of Alba ===
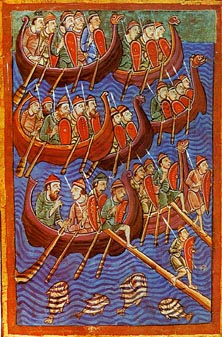
Danish seamen, painted mid-12th century

The balance between rival kingdoms was transformed in 793 when ferocious Viking raids began on monasteries like Iona and Lindisfarne, creating fear and confusion across the kingdoms of North Britain. Orkney, Shetland and the Western Isles eventually fell to the Norsemen. The king of Fortriu, Eógan mac Óengusa, and the king of Dál Riata, Áed mac Boanta, were among the dead after a major defeat by the Vikings in 839. A mixture of Viking and Gaelic Irish settlement in south-west Scotland produced the Gall-Gaidel, the Norse Irish, from which the region gets the modern name Galloway. Sometime in the 9th century, the beleaguered kingdom of Dál Riata lost the Hebrides to the Vikings, when Ketil Flatnose is said to have founded the Kingdom of the Isles. These threats may have speeded a long-term process of gaelicisation of the Pictish kingdoms, which adopted Gaelic language and customs. There was also a merger of the Gaelic and Pictish crowns, although historians debate whether it was a Pictish takeover of Dál Riata, or the other way around. This culminated in the rise of Cínaed mac Ailpín (Kenneth MacAlpin) in the 840s, which brought to power the House of Alpin, who became the leaders of a combined Gaelic-Pictish kingdom. In 867 the Vikings seized Northumbria, forming the Kingdom of York; three years later they stormed the Briton fortress of Dumbarton and subsequently conquered much of England except for a reduced Kingdom of Wessex, leaving the new combined Pictish and Gaelic kingdom almost encircled.

The immediate descendants of Cináed were styled either as King of the Picts or King of Fortriu. They were ousted in 878 when Áed mac Cináeda was killed by Giric mac Dúngail, but returned on Giric's death in 889. When Cínaed's eventual successor Domnall mac Causantín died at Dunnottar in 900, he was the first man to be recorded as rí Alban (i.e. King of Alba). Such an apparent innovation in the Gaelic chronicles is occasionally taken to spell the birth of Scotland, but there is nothing extant from or about his reign that might confirm this. Known in Gaelic as "Alba", in Latin as "Scotia", and in English as "Scotland", his kingdom was the nucleus from which the Scottish kingdom would expand as the Viking influence waned, just as in the south the Kingdom of Wessex expanded to become the Kingdom of England.

== Geography ==
=== Physical geography ===
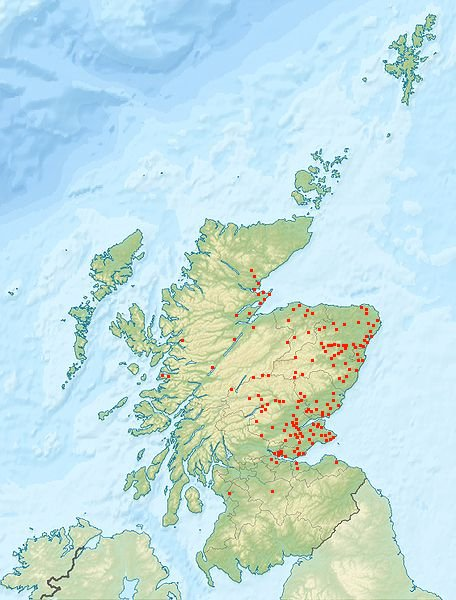
Map showing the distribution of Pit- place names in Scotland, thought to indicate Pictish settlement

Modern Scotland is half the size of England and Wales in area, but with its many inlets, islands and inland lochs, it has roughly the same amount of coastline at 4,000 miles. Only a fifth of Scotland is less than 60 metres above sea level. Its east Atlantic position means that it experiences heavy rainfall, especially in the west. This encouraged the spread of blanket peat bog, the acidity of which, combined with high levels of wind and salt spray, made most of the islands treeless. The existence of hills, mountains, quicksands and marshes made internal communication and conquest extremely difficult and may have contributed to the fragmented nature of political power. The Early Middle Ages were a period of climate deterioration, with a drop in temperature and an increase in rainfall, resulting in more land becoming unproductive.

=== Settlement ===
Roman influence beyond Hadrian's Wall does not appear to have had a major impact on settlement patterns, with Iron Age hill forts and promontory forts continuing to be occupied through the early medieval period. These often had defences of dry stone or timber laced walls, sometimes with a palisade. The large number of these forts has been taken to suggest peripatetic monarchies and aristocracies, moving around their domains to control and administer them. In the Northern and Western Isles the sites of Iron Age Brochs and wheel houses continued to be occupied, but were gradually replaced with less imposing cellular houses. There are a handful of major timber halls in the south, comparable to those excavated in Anglo-Saxon England and dated to the 7th century. In the areas of Scandinavian settlement in the islands and along the coast a lack of timber meant that native materials had to be adopted for house building, often combining layers of stone with turf.

Place-name evidence, particularly the use of the prefix "pit", meaning land or a field, suggests that the heaviest areas of Pictish settlement were in modern Fife, Perthshire, Angus, Aberdeen and around the Moray Firth, although later Gaelic migration may have erased some Pictish names from the record. Early Gaelic settlement appears to have been in the regions of the western mainland of Scotland between Cowal and Ardnamurchan, and the adjacent islands, later extending up the West coast in the 8th century. There is a place name and archaeological evidence of Anglian settlement in south-east Scotland reaching into West Lothian, and to a lesser extent into south-western Scotland. Later Norse settlement was probably most extensive in Orkney and Shetland, with lighter settlement in the western islands, particularly the Hebrides and on the mainland in Caithness, stretching along fertile river valleys through Sutherland and into Ross. There was also extensive Viking settlement in Bernicia, the Northern part of Northumbria, which stretched into the modern Borders and Lowlands.

=== Language ===
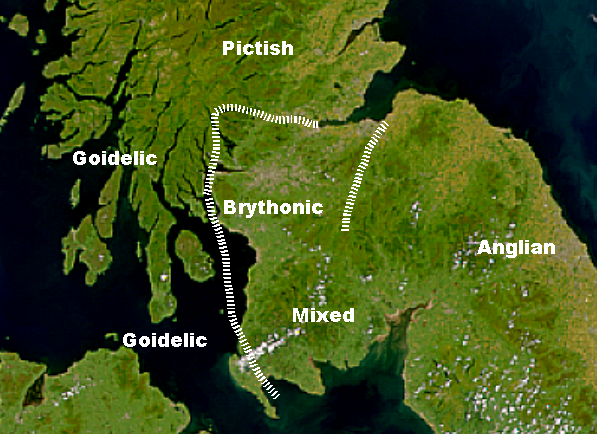
Possible language zones in southern Scotland, 7th–8th centuries

This period saw dramatic changes in the geography of language. Modern linguists divide the Celtic languages into two major groups, the P-Celtic, from which Welsh, Breton and Cornish derive, and the Q-Celtic, from which comes Irish, Manx and Gaelic. The Pictish language remains enigmatic since the Picts had no written script of their own and all that survives are place names and some isolated inscriptions in Irish ogham script. Most modern linguists accept that, although the nature and unity of the Pictish language is unclear, it belonged to the former group. Historical sources, as well as place-name evidence, indicate how the Pictish language in the north and Cumbric languages in the south were overlaid and replaced by Gaelic, English and later Norse in this period.

== Economy ==
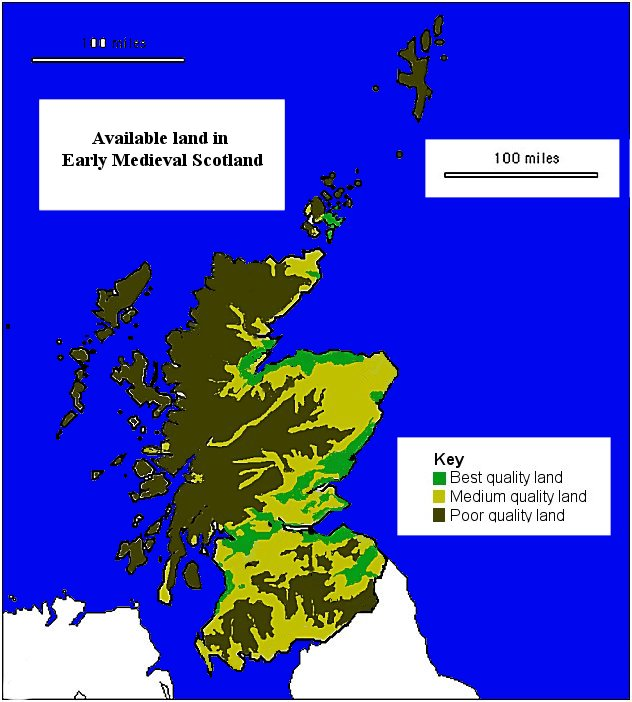
Map of available land in early Medieval Scotland

Lacking the urban centres created under the Romans in the rest of Britain, the economy of Scotland in the Early Middle Ages was overwhelmingly agricultural. Without significant transport links and wider markets, most farms had to produce a self-sufficient diet of meat, dairy products and cereals, supplemented by hunter-gathering. Limited archaeological evidence indicates that throughout Northern Britain farming was based around a single homestead or a small cluster of three or four homes, each probably containing a nuclear family, with relationships likely to be common among neighbouring houses and settlements, reflecting the partition of land through inheritance. Farming became based around a system that distinguished between the infield around the settlement, where crops were grown every year, and the outfield, further away and where crops were grown and then left fallow in different years, in a system that would continue until the 18th century. The evidence of bones indicates that cattle were by far the most important domesticated animal, followed by pigs, sheep and goats, while domesticated fowl were rare. Imported goods found in archaeological sites of the period include ceramics and glass, while many sites indicate iron and precious metal working.

== Demography ==
There are almost no written sources from which to reconstruct the demography of early Medieval Scotland. Estimates have been made of a population of 10,000 inhabitants in Dál Riata and 80–100,000 for Pictland. The 5th and 6th centuries likely saw higher mortality rates due to the appearance of bubonic plague, which may have reduced net population. The known conditions have been taken to suggest it was a high fertility, high mortality society, similar to many developing countries in the modern world, with a relatively young demographic profile, and perhaps early childbearing, and large numbers of children for women. This would have meant that there was a relatively small proportion of available workers to the number of mouths to feed. This would have made it difficult to produce a surplus that would allow demographic growth and more complex societies to develop.

== Society ==
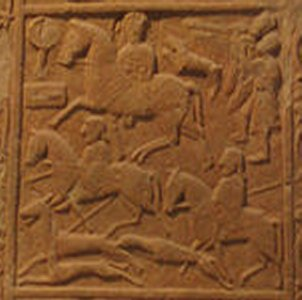
Detail of the Class II Hilton of Cadboll Stone, showing mounted members of the aristocracy

The primary unit of social organisation in Germanic and Celtic Europe was the kin group. The mention of descent through the female line in the ruling families of the Picts in later sources and the recurrence of leaders clearly from outside of Pictish society, has led to the conclusion that their system of descent was matrilineal. However, this has been challenged by a number of historians who argue that the clear evidence of awareness of descent through the male line suggests that this is more likely to indicate a bilateral system of descent, where descent was counted through both male and female lines.

Scattered evidence, including the records in Irish annals and the images of warriors like those depicted on the Pictish stone slabs at Aberlemno, Forfarshire and Hilton of Cadboll in Easter Ross, suggest that in Northern Britain, as in Anglo-Saxon England, society was dominated by a military aristocracy, whose status was dependent in a large part on their ability and willingness to fight. Below the level of the aristocracy it is assumed that there were non-noble freemen, working their own small farms or holding lands as free tenants. There are no surviving law codes from Scotland in this period, but codes in Ireland and Wales indicate that freemen had the right to bear arms, represent themselves in law and to receive compensation for murdered kinsmen.

Indications are that society in North Britain contained relatively large numbers of slaves, often taken in war and raids, or bought, as St. Patrick indicated the Picts were doing from the Britons in Southern Scotland. Slavery probably reached relatively far down in society, with most rural households containing some slaves. Because they were taken relatively young and were usually racially indistinguishable from their masters, many slaves would have been more integrated into their societies of capture than their societies of origin, in terms of both culture and language. Living and working beside their owners they in practice may have become members of a household without the inconvenience of the partible inheritance rights that divided estates. Where there is better evidence from England and elsewhere, it was common for such slaves who survived to middle age to gain their freedom, with such freedmen often remaining clients of the families of their former masters.

== Kingship ==
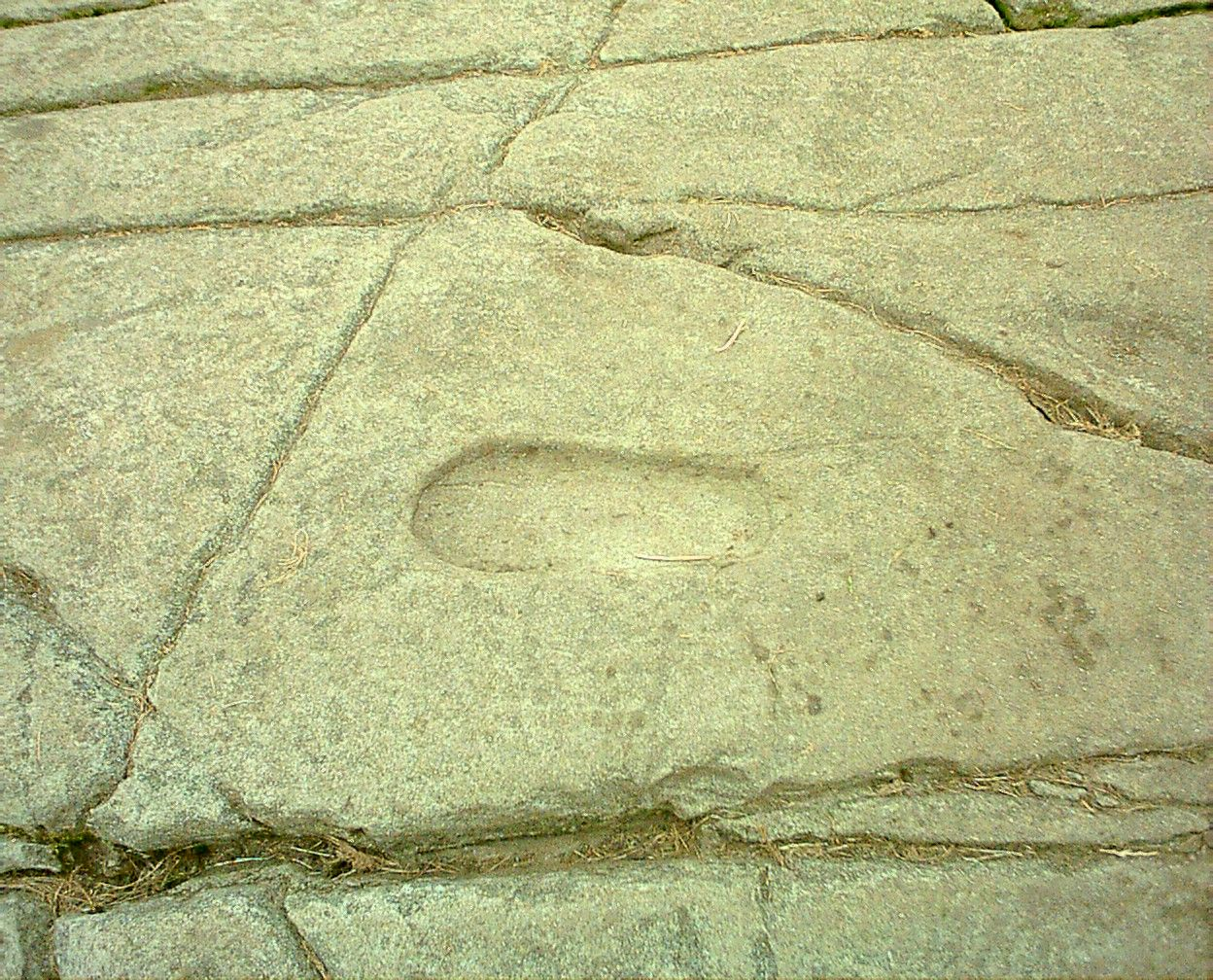
Footprint (replica) used in king-making ceremonies at Dunadd

In the early medieval period, British kingship was not inherited in a direct line from previous kings, as would be the case in the late Middle Ages. There were instead a number of candidates for kingship, who usually needed to be a member of a particular dynasty and to claim descent from a particular ancestor. Kingship could be multi-layered and very fluid. The Pictish kings of Fortriu were probably acting as overlords of other Pictish kings for much of this period and occasionally were able to assert an overlordship over non-Pictish kings, but occasionally themselves had to acknowledge the overlordship of external rulers, both Anglian and British. Such relationships may have placed obligations to pay tribute or to supply armed forces. After a victory, sub-kings may have received rewards in return for this service. Interaction with and intermarriage into the ruling families of subject kingdoms may have opened the way to the absorption of such sub-kingdoms and, although there might be later overturnings of these mergers, likely, a complex process by which kingship was gradually monopolised by a handful of the most powerful dynasties was taking place.

The primary role of the king was to act as a war leader, reflected in the very small number of minority or female reigning monarchs in the period. Kings organised the defence of their people's lands, property and persons and negotiated with other kings to secure these things. If they failed to do so, the settlements might be raided, destroyed or annexed, and the populations killed or taken into slavery. Kings also engaged in the low-level warfare of raiding and the more ambitious full-scale warfare that led to conflicts of large armies and alliances, and which could be undertaken over relatively large distances, such as the expedition to Orkney by Dál Riata in 581 or the Northumbrian attack on Ireland in 684.

Kingship had its ritual aspects. The kings of Dál Riata were inaugurated by putting their foot in a footprint carved in stone, signifying that they would follow in the footsteps of their predecessors. The kingship of the unified kingdom of Alba had Scone and its sacred stone at the heart of its coronation ceremony, which historians presume was inherited from Pictish practices. Iona, the early centre of Scottish Christianity, became the burial site of the early kings of Scotland until the eleventh century, when the House of Canmore adopted Dunfermline, closer to Scone.

== Warfare ==
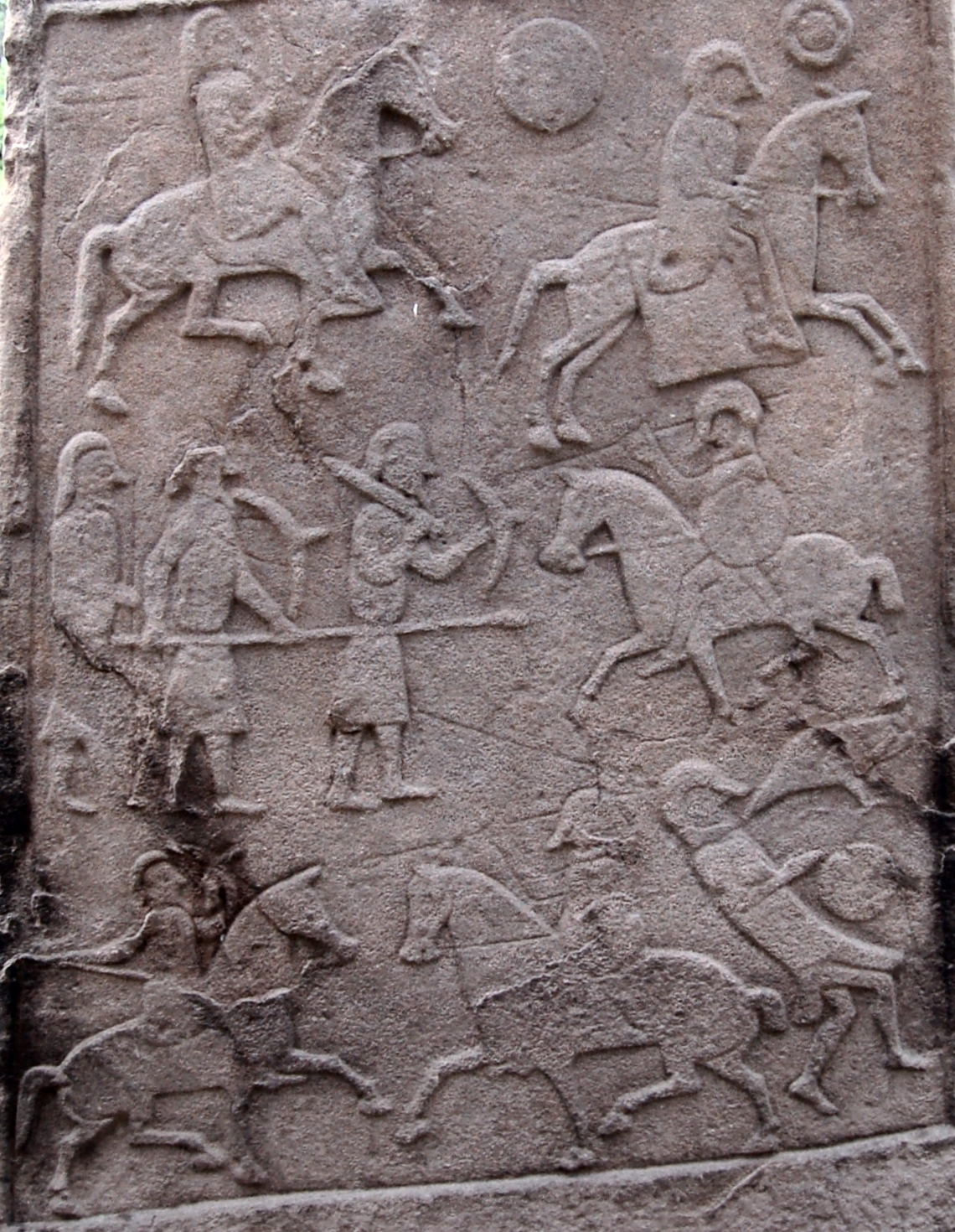
The battle scene from the Aberlemno Pictish stone, generally presumed to show the Battle of Dunnichen in 685

At the most basic level, a king's power rested on the existence of his bodyguard or war-band. In the British language, this was called the teulu, as in teulu Dewr (the "War-band of Deira"). In Latin the word is either comitatus or tutores, or even familia; tutores is the most common word in this period, and derives from the Latin verb tueor, meaning "defend, preserve from danger". The war-band functioned as an extension of the ruler's legal person, and was the core of the larger armies that were mobilised from time to time for campaigns of significant size. In peacetime, the war-band's activity was centred on the "Great Hall". Here, in both Germanic and Celtic cultures, the feasting, drinking and other forms of male bonding that kept up the war-band's integrity would take place. In the epic poem Beowulf, the war-band was said to sleep in the Great Hall after the lord had retired to his adjacent bed chamber. It is not likely that any war-band in the period exceeded 120–150 men, as no hall structure having a capacity larger than this has been found by archaeologists in northern Britain. Pictish stones, like that at Aberlemno in Angus, show mounted and foot warriors with swords, spears, bows, helmets and shields. The large number of hill forts in Scotland may have made open battle less important than in Anglo-Saxon England and the relatively high proportion of kings who are recorded as dying in fires or drowning suggest that sieges were a more important part of warfare in Northern Britain.

Sea power may also have been important. Irish annals record an attack by the Picts on Orkney in 682, which must have necessitated a large naval force: they also lost 150 ships in a disaster in 729. Ships were also vital in the amphibious warfare in the Highlands and Islands and from the seventh century the Senchus fer n-Alban indicates that Dál Riata had a ship-muster system that obliged groups of households to produce a total of 177 ships and 2,478 men. The same source mentions the first recorded naval battle around the British Isles in 719 and eight naval expeditions between 568 and 733. The only vessels to survive from this period are dugout canoes, but images from the period suggest that there may have been skin boats (similar to the Irish currach) and larger oared vessels. The Viking raids and invasions of the British Isles were based on superior sea power. The key to their success was a graceful, long, narrow, light, wooden boat with a shallow draft hull designed for speed. This shallow draft allowed navigation in waters only 3 feet (1 m) deep and permitted beach landings, while its light weight enabled it to be carried over portages. Longships were also double-ended, the symmetrical bow and stern allowing the ship to reverse direction quickly without having to turn around.

== Religion ==
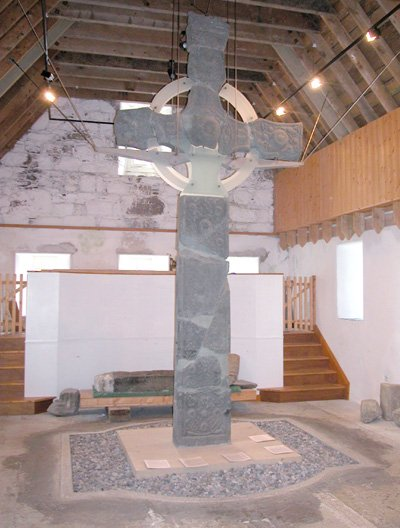
St. John's cross which stood outside Iona Abbey

=== Pre-Christian religion ===
Very little is known about religion in Scotland before the arrival of Christianity. The lack of native written sources among the Picts means that it can only be judged from parallels elsewhere, occasional surviving archaeological evidence and hostile accounts of later Christian writers. It is generally presumed to have resembled Celtic polytheism. The names of more than two hundred Celtic deities have been noted, some of which, like Lugh, The Dagda and The Morrigan, come from later Irish mythology, whilst others, like Teutates, Taranis and Cernunnos, come from evidence from Gaul. The Celtic pagans constructed temples and shrines to venerate these gods, something they did through votive offerings and performing sacrifices, possibly including human sacrifice. According to Greek and Roman accounts, in Gaul, Britain and Ireland, there was a priestly caste of "magico-religious specialists" known as the druids, although very little is definitely known about them. Irish legends about the origin of the Picts and stories from the life of St. Ninian, associate the Picts with druids. The Picts are also associated with "demon" worship and one story concerning St Columba has him exorcising a demon from a well in Pictland, suggesting that the worship of well spirits was a feature of Pictish paganism. Roman mentions of the worship of the Goddess Minerva at wells and a Pictish stone associated with a well near Dunvegan Castle on Skye have been taken to support this case.

=== Early Christianisation ===
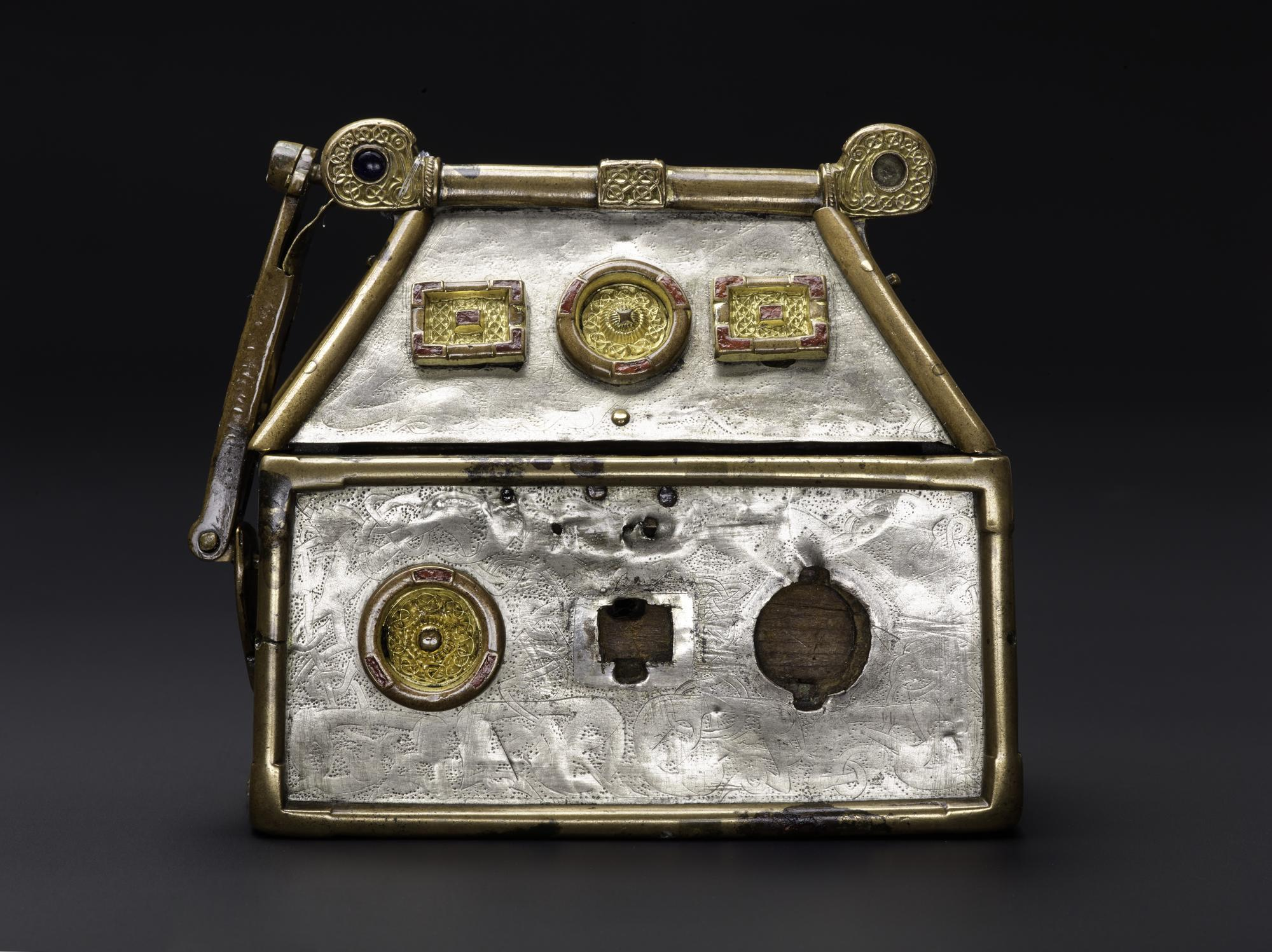
The Monymusk Reliquary, or Brecbennoch as it was called, dates from c. 750, and purportedly enclosed bones of Columba, the most popular saint in Medieval Scotland

The roots of Christianity in Scotland can probably be found among the soldiers, notably Saint Kessog, son of the king of Cashel, and ordinary Roman citizens in the vicinity of Hadrian's Wall. The archaeology of the Roman period indicates that the northern parts of the Roman province of Britannia were among the most Christianized in the island. Chi-Rho inscriptions and Christian grave slabs have been found on the wall from the 4th century, and from the same period the Mithraic shrines (known as Mithraea) which existed along Hadrian's Wall were attacked and destroyed, presumably by Christians. After the departure of the Romans it is generally presumed that Christianity would have survived among the Brythonic enclaves such as Strathclyde, but retreated as the pagan Anglo-Saxons advanced, with their gods Tiw, Woden, Thor and Frig, all of whom gave their names to days of the week, and Eostre, whose name was appropriated for the spring festival of Easter. While British Christians continued to practice inhumation without grave goods, the pagan Anglo-Saxons are visible in the archaeological record from their practice of cremation and burial in urns, accompanied by extensive grave goods, perhaps designed to accompany the dead to the afterlife. However, despite growing evidence of Anglian settlement in southern Scotland, only one such grave has been found, at Dalmeny in East Lothian.

The growth of Christianity in Scotland has been traditionally seen as dependent on Irish-Scots "Celtic" missionaries and to a lesser extent those from Rome and England. Celtic Christianity had its origins in the conversion of Ireland from late Roman Britain associated with St. Patrick in the 5th century. In the 6th century, monks ordained by St Patrick as missionaries such as St Kessog, son of the Irish King of Cashel, about 490 CE started his abbey halfway between Glasgow and Edinburgh. Shortly after St. Columba, also Irish, formed Iona abbey; both martyrs. Subsequent monk missionaries from Ireland operated on the British mainland, spreading a unifying culture. St Ninian is the figure associated with a monastery founded at Whithorn in what is now Galloway, although it is generally accepted that Ninian may be a later construct. St Columba left Ireland and founded the monastery at Iona off the West Coast of Scotland in 563 and from there carried out missions to the Scots of Dál Riata and the Picts. It seems likely that both the Scots and the Picts had already begun to convert to Christianity before this period. Saint Patrick referred in a letter to "apostate Picts", suggesting that they had previously been Christian, while the poem Y Gododdin, set in the early 6th century does not remark on the Picts as pagans. Conversion of the Pictish élite seems likely to have run over a considerable period, beginning in the 5th century and not complete until the 7th.

Among the key indicators of Christianisation are long-cist cemeteries that generally indicate Christian burials due to their east-west orientation, although this correlation has been challenged by recent research. These burials are found between the end of the Roman era and the 7th century, after which point they become rarer. They are concentrated strongly in eastern Scotland south of the Tay, in Angus, the Mearns, Lothian and the Borders. It is generally accepted among scholars that the place-name element eccles-, from the Brythonic word for church, represents evidence of the British church of the Roman and immediate post-Roman period, most of which are located in the south-west, south and east. About a dozen inscribed stones of the 5th and 6th centuries, beginning with the so-called Latinus stone of Whithorn, dating to c. 450, indicate Christianity through their dedications and are spread across southern Scotland.

=== Celtic Christianity ===
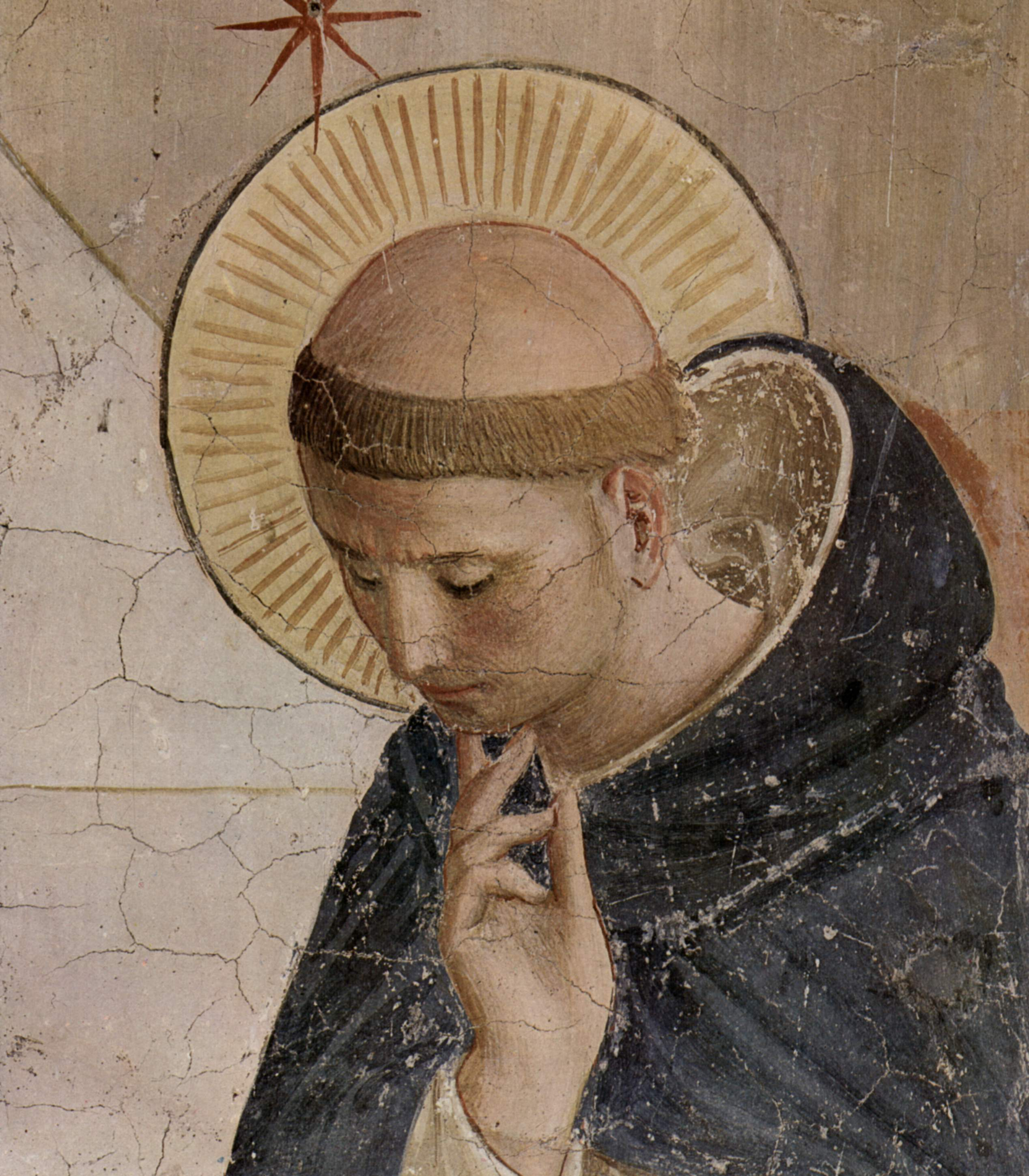
The "Roman" tonsure, in the shape of a crown, differing from the Irish tradition, where the hair above the forehead was shaved

Celtic Christianity differed in some respects from that based on Rome, most importantly on the issues of how Easter was calculated and the method of tonsure, but there were also differences in the rites of ordination, baptism and in the liturgy. Celtic Christianity was heavily based on monasticism. Monasteries differed significantly from those on the continent, and were often an isolated collection of wooden huts surrounded by a wall. Because much of the Celtic world lacked the urban centres of the Roman world, bishoprics were often attached to abbeys. In the 5th, 6th and 7th centuries, Irish monks established monastic institutions in parts of modern-day Scotland. Monks from Iona, under St. Aidan, then founded the See of Lindisfarne in Anglian Northumbria. The part of southern Scotland dominated by the Anglians in this period had a Bishopric established at Abercorn in West Lothian, and it is presumed that it would have adopted the leadership of Rome after the Synod of Whitby in 663, until the Battle of Dunnichen in 685, when the Bishop and his followers were ejected. By this time the Roman system of calculating Easter and other reforms had already been adopted in much of Ireland. The Picts accepted the reforms of Rome under Nechtan mac Der-Ilei around 710. The followers of Celtic traditions retreated to Iona and then to Innishbofin and the Western isles remained an outpost of Celtic practice for some time. Celtic Christianity continued to influence religion in England and across Europe into the late Middle Ages as part of the Hiberno-Scottish mission, spreading Christianity, monasteries, art and theological ideas across the continent.

=== Viking paganism ===
The Viking occupation of the islands and coastal regions of modern Scotland brought a return to pagan worship in those areas. Norse paganism had some of the same gods as had been worshipped by the Anglo-Saxons before their conversion and is thought to have been focused around a series of cults, involving gods, ancestors and spirits, with calendric and life cycle rituals often involving forms of sacrifice. The paganism of the ruling Norse elite can be seen in goods found in 10th century graves in Shetland, Orkney and Caithness. There is no contemporary account of the conversion of the Vikings in Scotland to Christianity. Historians have traditionally pointed to a process of conversion to Christianity among Viking colonies in Britain dated to the late 10th century, for which later accounts indicate that Viking earls accepted Christianity. However, there is evidence that conversion had begun before this point. There are a large number of isles called Pabbay or Papa in the Western and Northern Isles, which may indicate a "hermit's" or "priest's isle" from this period. Changes in patterns of grave goods and Viking place names using -kirk also suggests that Christianity had begun to spread before the official conversion. Later documentary evidence suggests that a Bishop was operating in Orkney in the mid-9th century and more recently uncovered archaeological evidence, including explicitly Christian forms such as stone crosses, suggest that Christian practice may have survived the Viking take over in parts of Orkney and Shetland and that the process of conversion may have begun before Christianity was officially accepted by Viking leaders. The continuity of Scottish Christianity may also explain the relatively rapid way in which Norse settlers were later assimilated into the religion.

== Art ==
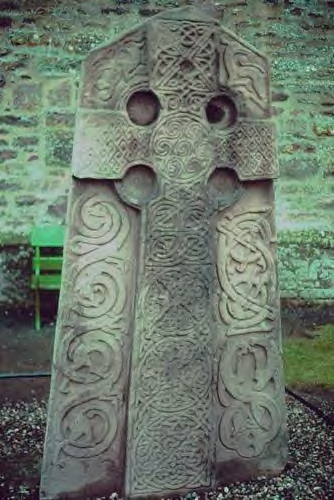
The Class II Kirkyard stone c. 800, Aberlemno

From the 5th to the mid-9th centuries the art of the Picts is primarily known through stone sculpture, and a smaller number of pieces of metalwork, often of very high quality. After the conversion of the Picts and the cultural assimilation of Pictish culture into that of the Scots and Angles, elements of Pictish art became incorporated into the style known as Insular art, which was common over Britain and Ireland and became highly influential in continental Europe and contributed to the development of Romanesque styles.

=== Pictish stones ===
About 250 Pictish stones survive and have been assigned by scholars to three classes. Class I stones are those thought to date to the period up to the 7th century and are the most numerous group. The stones are largely unshaped and include incised symbols of animals including fish and the Pictish beast, everyday objects such as mirrors, combs and tuning forks and abstract symbols defined by names including V-rod, double disc and Z-rod. They are found from the Firth of Forth to Shetland. The greatest concentrations are in Sutherland, around modern Inverness and Aberdeen. Good examples include the Dunrobin (Sutherland) and Aberlemno stones (Angus). Class II stones are carefully shaped slabs dating after the arrival of Christianity in the 8th and 9th centuries, with a cross on one face and a wide range of symbols on the reverse. In smaller numbers than Class I stones, they predominate in southern Pictland, in Perth, Angus and Fife. Good examples include Glamis 2, which contains a finely executed Celtic cross on the main face with two opposing male figures, a centaur, cauldron, deer head and a triple disc symbol and Cossans, Angus, which shows a high-prowed Pictish boat with oarsmen and a figure facing forward in the prow. Class III stones are thought to overlap chronologically with Class II stones. Most are elaborately shaped and incised cross-slabs, some with figurative scenes, but lacking idiomatic Pictish symbols. They are widely distributed but predominate in the southern Pictish areas.

=== Pictish metalwork ===
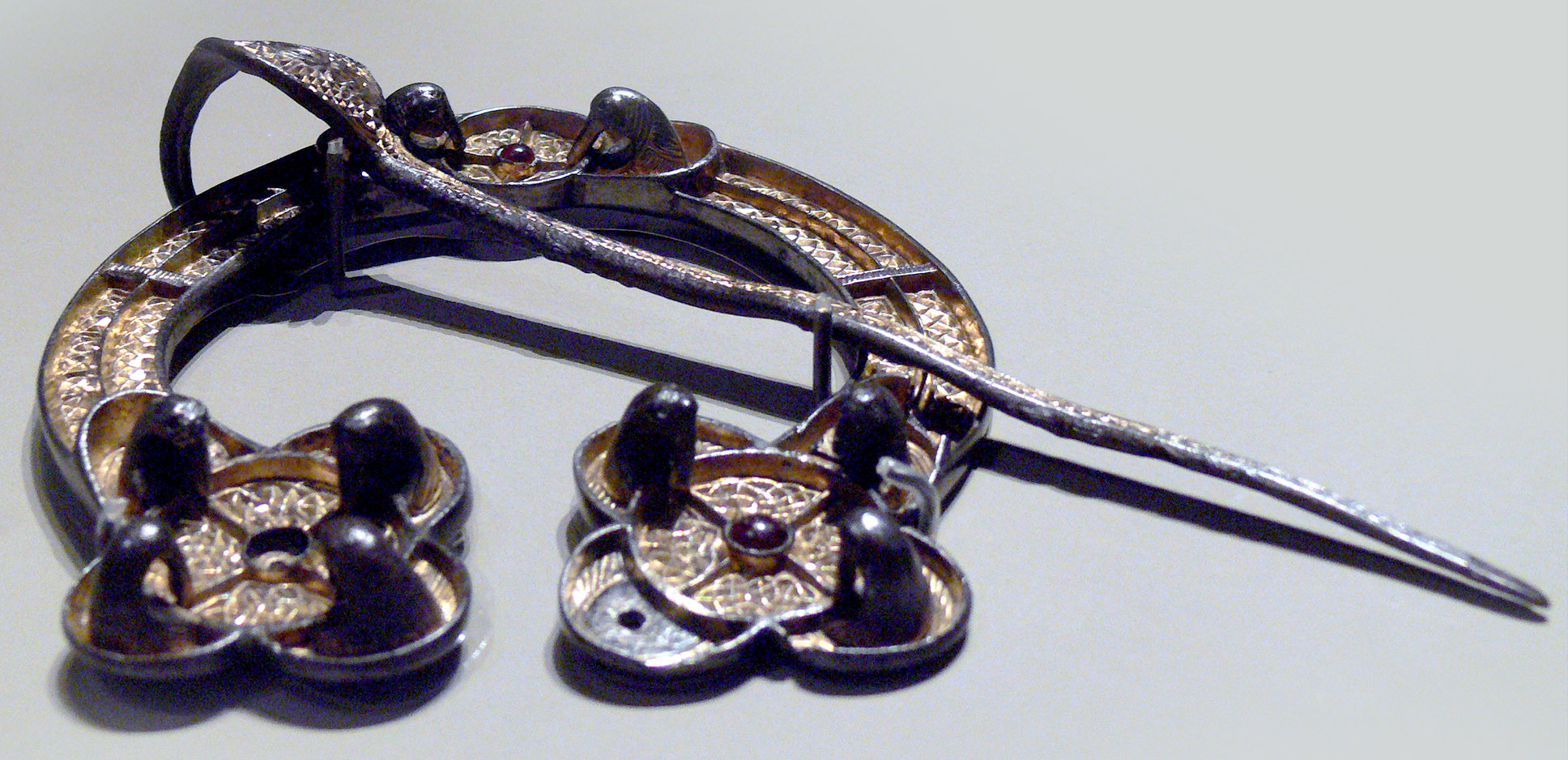
The Rogart brooch, National Museums of Scotland, FC2. Pictish penannular brooch, 8th century, silver with gilding and glass. Classified as Fowler H3 type.

Metalwork has been found throughout Pictland; the Picts appear to have had a considerable amount of silver available, probably from raiding further south, or the payment of subsidies to keep them from doing so. The very large hoard of late Roman hacksilver found at Traprain Law may have originated in either way. The largest hoard of early Pictish metalwork was found in 1819 at Norrie's Law in Fife, but unfortunately, much was dispersed and melted down. Over ten heavy silver chains, some over 0.5 metres (2 ft) long, have been found from this period; the double-linked Whitecleuch Chain is one of only two that have a penannular ring, with symbol decoration including enamel, which shows how these were probably used as "choker" necklaces. The St Ninian's Isle Treasure contains perhaps the best collection of Pictish forms.

=== Irish-Scots art ===
The kingdom of Dál Riata has been seen as a crossroads between the artistic styles of the Picts and those of Ireland, with which the Scots settlers in what is now Argyll kept close contact. This can be seen in representations found in excavations of the fortress of Dunadd, which combine Pictish and Irish elements. This included extensive evidence for the production of high-status jewellery and moulds from the 7th century that indicate the production of pieces similar to the Hunterston brooch, found in Ayrshire, but with elements that suggest Irish origins. These and other finds, including a trumpet spiral decorated hanging bowl disc and a stamped animal decoration (or pressblech), perhaps from a bucket or drinking horn, indicate how Dál Riata was one of the locations where the Insular style was developed. In the 8th and 9th centuries the Pictish elite adopted true penannular brooches with lobed terminals from Ireland. Some older Irish pseudo-penannular brooches were adapted to the Pictish style, for example, the Breadalbane Brooch (British Museum). The 8th century Monymusk Reliquary has elements of Pictish and Irish style.

=== Insular art ===
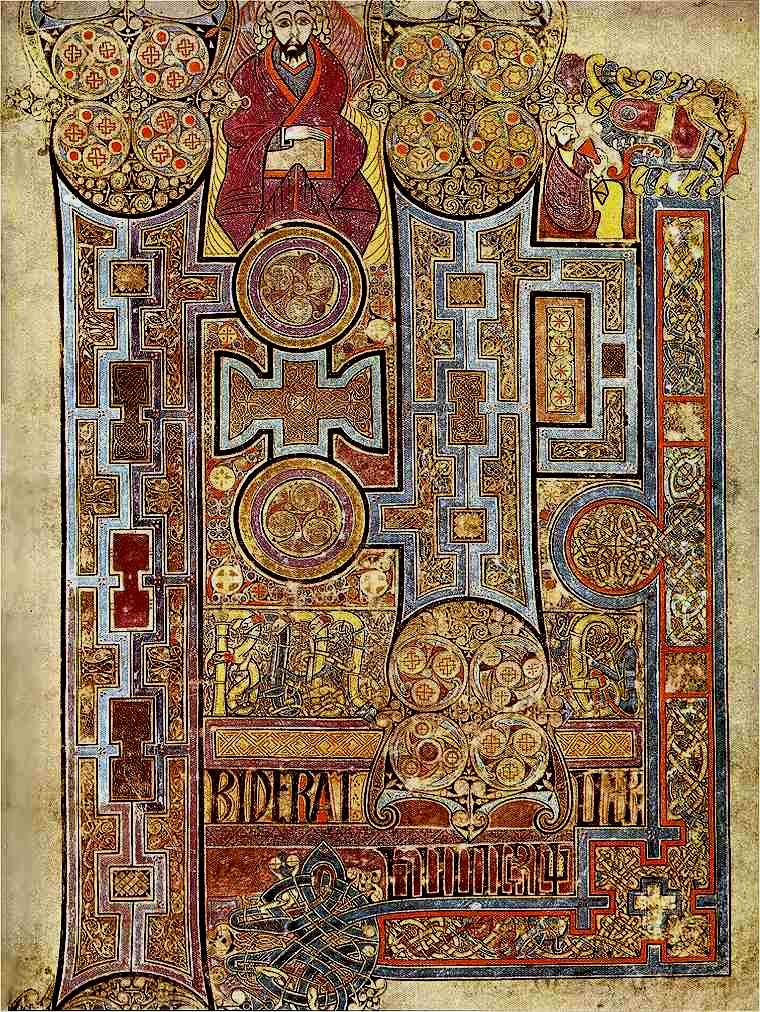
Opening page from the Gospel of John from the Book of Kells

Insular art, or Hiberno-Saxon art, is the name given to the common style produced in Scotland, Britain and Anglo-Saxon England from the 7th century, with the combining of Celtic and Anglo-Saxon forms. Surviving examples of Insular art are found in metalwork, carving, but mainly in illuminated manuscripts. Surfaces are highly decorated with intricate patterning, with no attempt to give an impression of depth, volume or recession. The best examples include the Book of Kells, Lindisfarne Gospels, Book of Durrow. Carpet pages are a characteristic feature of Insular manuscripts, although historiated initials (an Insular invention), canon tables and figurative miniatures, especially Evangelist portraits, are also common. The finest era of the style was brought to an end by the disruption to monastic centres and aristocratic life of the Viking raids in the late 8th century. The influence of Insular art affected all subsequent European medieval art, especially in the decorative elements of Romanesque and Gothic manuscripts.

== Architecture ==
For the period after the departure of the Romans, there is evidence of a series of new forts, often smaller "nucleated" constructions compared with those from the Iron Age, sometimes utilising major geographical features, as at Edinburgh and Dunbarton. All the northern British peoples utilised different forms of fort and the determining factors in construction were local terrain, building materials, and politico-military needs. The first identifiable king of the Picts, Bridei mac Maelchon had his base at the fort of Craig Phadrig near modern Inverness. The Gaelic overkingdom of Dál Riata was probably ruled from the fortress of Dunadd now near Kilmartin in Argyll and Bute. The introduction of Christianity into Scotland from Ireland from the sixth century, led to the construction of the first churches. These may originally have been wooden, like that excavated at Whithorn, but most of those for which evidence survives from this era are basic masonry-built churches, beginning on the west coast and islands and spreading south and east.

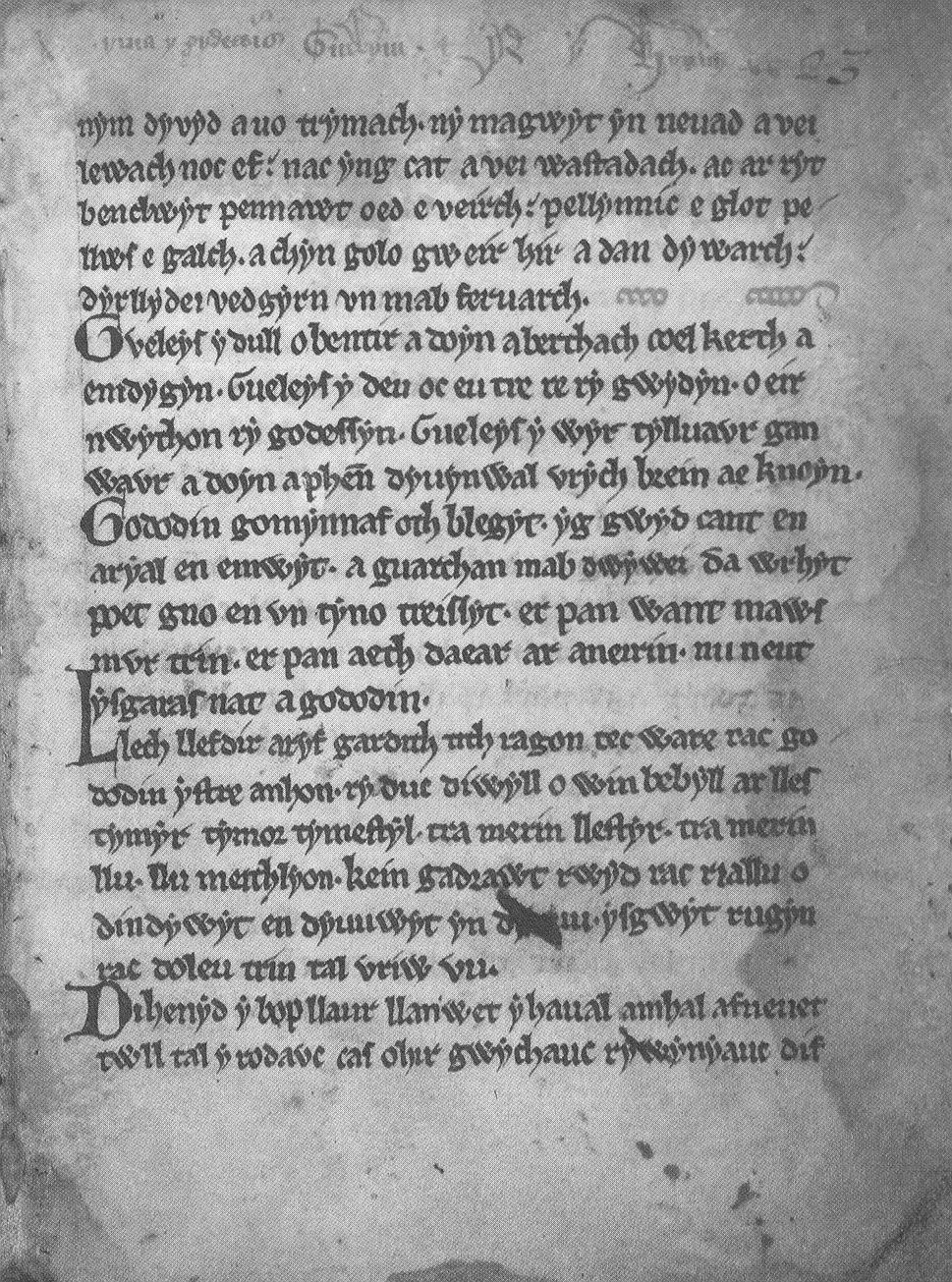
A page from the Book of Aneirin shows the first part of the text from the Gododdin c. sixth century

Early chapels tended to have square-ended converging walls, similar to Irish chapels of this period. Medieval parish church architecture in Scotland was typically much less elaborate than in England, with many churches remaining simple oblongs, without transepts and aisles, and often without towers. In the Highlands, they were often even simpler, many built of rubble masonry and sometimes indistinguishable from the outside from houses or farm buildings. Monasteries also differed significantly from those on the continent, and were often an isolated collection of wooden huts surrounded by a wall. At Eileach an Naoimh in the Inner Hebrides there are huts, a chapel, refectory, guest house, barns and other buildings. Most of these were made of timber and wattle construction and probably thatched with heather and turves. They were later rebuilt in stone, with underground cells and circular "beehive" huts like those used in Ireland. Similar sites have been excavated on Bute, Orkney and Shetland. From the eighth century more sophisticated buildings emerged.

== Literature ==
Much of the earliest Welsh literature was composed in or near the country now called Scotland, although only written down in Wales much later. These include The Gododdin, considered the earliest surviving verse from Scotland, which is attributed to the bard Aneirin, said to have been resident in Gododdin in the 6th century, and the Battle of Gwen Ystrad attributed to Taliesin, traditionally thought to be a bard at the court of Rheged in roughly the same period. There are also religious works in Gaelic including the Elegy for St Columba by Dallan Forgaill (c. 597) and "In Praise of St Columba" by Beccan mac Luigdech of Rum (c. 677). In Latin they include a "Prayer for Protection" (attributed to St Mugint) (c. mid-6th century) and Altus Prosator ("The High Creator", attributed to St Columba) (c. 597). In Old English there is The Dream of the Rood, from which lines are found on the Ruthwell Cross, making it the only surviving fragment of Northumbrian Old English from early Medieval Scotland.
