= Elfin of Alt Clut =

Elfin was a ruler of Alt Clut, a Brittonic kingdom based on Dumbarton Rock, sometime in the later 7th century. According to the Harleian genealogies, he was the son of Eugein I, one of his predecessors as king, and the father of Beli II, who ruled some time later. Very little is certainly known of him, though he may be identifiable with other figures attested in the Irish annals, and circumstantial evidence may link him to a number of important events during this time.

== Identifications ==
Elfin may be identified with the Alphin m. Nectin listed in the Annals of Ulster as dying in 693 along with Bruide m. Bili (i.e., Bridei III of the Picts). It is possible that this Nectin is Neithon of Alt Clut, an earlier King of Alt Clut, and that the Harleian genealogies have Elfin's pedigree wrong. However, this identification would cause serious incongruities in the dating of the other kings of Alt Clut, as Neithon was the grandfather of Eugein I and is thought to have died around 620. Scholars such as Alfred P. Smyth suggest two Elfins, one the son of Eugein and one the son of Neithon. However, Alan MacQuarrie suggests that there was one Elfin, but that the Annals of Ulster have substituted the name of his great-grandfather Neithon for his father Eugein, an error perhaps reflecting importance attached to descent from Neithon.

James E. Fraser suggests that Elfin may be further identified with the Eliuin m. Cuirp whose capture alongside Conamail son of Cano is recorded by the Annals of Ulster under the year 673. This reading takes m[ac] Cuirp as an error for moccu Irp, an Old Irish equivalent of the Latin nepos Uerb. This patronymic, or perhaps gentilic, is attached to the King of the Picts Nechtan nepos Uerb, who may be identifiable with Neithon of Alt Clut and therefore have been Elfin's great-grandfather.

The Annals of Tigernach report that in the year 678, the Dál Riatan kindred known as the Cenél Loairn, under Ferchar Fota, were defeated by the Britons at a location called Tíriu. Elfin is the only candidate for the kingship of the Alt Clut Britons of the period, and so may have been responsible for the victory. If the 673 annal is taken to refer to Elfin he had apparently been active earlier in Dál Riata, in the year in which Domangart, son of Domnall Brecc, king of Cenél nGabráin, was killed. His fellow captive, Conamail, is thought to have been the son of Cano Garb – who gave his name to the protagonist of the romance Scéla Cano meic Gartnáin – of Cenél nGartnait, a kindred based in Skye. Elfin may also have led the Britons who defeated the Cruthin of Ulster at Ráth Mór in Mag Line (a plain near modern Larne) in 682, killing their king Cathassach.

== Notes ==
Regnal titles
Preceded by Guret?	King of Alt Clut died c. 693	Succeeded by Dumnagual II?
