= Eugein I of Alt Clut =

Brittonic ruler of Alt Clut

Eugein or Ywain (fl. 642, died before 658) was a ruler of Alt Clut, a Brittonic kingdom based on Dumbarton Rock, sometime in the mid-7th century. According to the Harleian genealogies, he was the son of Beli I, presumably his predecessor as king, and the father of Elfin, who ruled sometime later. The Annals of Ulster and the Annals of Tigernach record another probable son, Dumnagual, who ruled Alt Clut and died in 694. Eugein was probably the brother or half brother of Bridei III of the Picts, the victor at the Battle of Dun Nechtain.

The Annals of Ulster record that a Hoan or Oan, King of the Britons, defeated and killed Domnall Brecc of Dál Riata at a place called Srath Caruin (Strathcarron) in 642. A stanza interpolated in the poem Y Gododdin, often known as the "Strathcarron interpolation" or simply The Battle of Strathcarron, refers to these events, indicating that the forces of "Nwython's grandson" (i.e., Eugein, the grandson of Neithon of Alt Clut) triumphed over "Dyfnwal Frych" (Domnall Brecc), the ruler of "Pentir" (Kintyre, or Dál Riata). Eugein's date of death is unknown, but he was certainly dead by 658, when another king of Alt Clut, Guret, has his death recorded by the Annals of Ulster. This Guret does not appear in the genealogies; he may have been a brother or son of Eugein.

== Notes ==
Regnal titles
Preceded by Beli	King of Alt Clut fl. 642	Succeeded by ?Guret
