= Guret of Alt Clut =

Guret (died 658) was a ruler of Alt Clut, a Brittonic kingdom based on Dumbarton Rock, during the mid-7th century. He is known only from an obituary note in the Annals of Ulster, which records Mors Gureit regis Alo Cluathe ("the death of Guret, king of Alt Clut") under the year 658. He is absent from the Harleian genealogies, which record the names of many other kings of Alt Clut. Historian Alan MacQuarrie suggests that he may have been an otherwise unrecorded brother, or perhaps son, of Eugein I of Alt Clut.

== Notes ==
Regnal titles
Preceded by Eugein I	King of Alt Clut d. 658	Succeeded by Elfin?
