= Dumnagual II of Alt Clut =

Dumnagual II (Old Welsh: Dumnagual; Modern Welsh: Dyfnwal ab Owain; died 694) was a ruler of Alt Clut, a Brittonic kingdom based on Dumbarton Rock, for some time in the late seventh century. He is known only from his death notice in the Irish annals. The Annals of Ulster, under the year 694, has Domnall m. Auin, rex Alo Cluathe, moritur ("Domnall, son of Aun, king of Alt Clut, dies"). Dumnagual is the Old Welsh equivalent of Domnall, and Aun is certainly Eugein, probably to be identified with King Eugein I of Alt Clut.

Regnal titles
Preceded by Elfin	King of Alt Clut d. 694	Succeeded by Beli
