= Beli I of Alt Clut =

King of Alt Clut (7th century)

Beli I was a ruler of Alt Clut, a Brittonic kingdom based on Dumbarton Rock, some time in the 7th century. Very little is known of him, but his family appears to have been very well connected in northern Britain.

The Harleian genealogies name Beli as the son of Neithon, his predecessor as king, and the father of Eugein I, his successor. Beli map Neithon is probably identifiable as the Beli who was the father of Bridei III of the Picts, as the Elegy for Bruide mac Bili attributed to Adomnán calls Bridei mac rígh Ala Cluaithe ("son of the King of Alt Clut"). The Historia Brittonum says that Bridei was the fratruelis or maternal first cousin of Ecgfrith of Northumbria, indicating that Beli's wife might have been of the Northumbrian nobility, though Bridei must have had some Pictish connection to become king of Fortriu. The Annales Cambriae entry for 627 refers to the death of a certain Belin, who may be identified with Beli map Neithon. He was certainly dead by 642, the year Irish sources record King Oan or Hoan of Alt Clut (apparently Beli's son Eugein) fighting the Battle of Strathcarron.

== Notes ==
Regnal titles
Preceded by Neithon	King of Alt Clut fl. early to mid-7th century	Succeeded by Eugein
