= Neithon of Alt Clut =

Ruler of Alt Clut

Neithon son of Guipno (died c. 621) was a 7th-century ruler of Alt Clut, a Brittonic kingdom based on Dumbarton Rock. According to the Harleian genealogies, he was the son of Guipno map Dumnagual Hen. Alfred Smyth suggests he is the same man as King Nechtan the Great of the Picts, and perhaps the Nechtan son of Canu the Annals of Ulster record as having died in 621. The Senchus fer n-Alban indicate that Gartnait, the son of Áedán mac Gabráin, King of Dál Riata, sired a son named Cano, but unless the Harleian genealogies are to be ignored, this would make Gartnait and Dumnagual Hen the same persons, as the respective fathers of Gartnait and Guipno. However, it is possible that either as an Alt Clut Briton ascending the throne of Pictland, or as a Pict ascending the throne of Alt Clut, his genealogy might have been altered, and it is notable that in the Pictish king-lists he is called "Nechtan, nepos Uerb", suggesting that it was a descent from Uerb that mattered in Pictland, and not his unimportant father Guipno/Canu. Alan Orr Anderson pointed out that Uerb is probably the Pictish form of Ferb (genitive Feirbe), a female name. Alan MacQuarrie suggests that Neithon was indeed the Pictish king Nechtan, but does not take any stance on the Guipno/Canu problem.

== Notes ==
Regnal titles
| Preceded by Riderch Hael | King of Alt Clut fl. early-600s | Succeeded by Beli |
