= Lincluden Collegiate Church =

Church in Dumfries and Galloway, Scotland

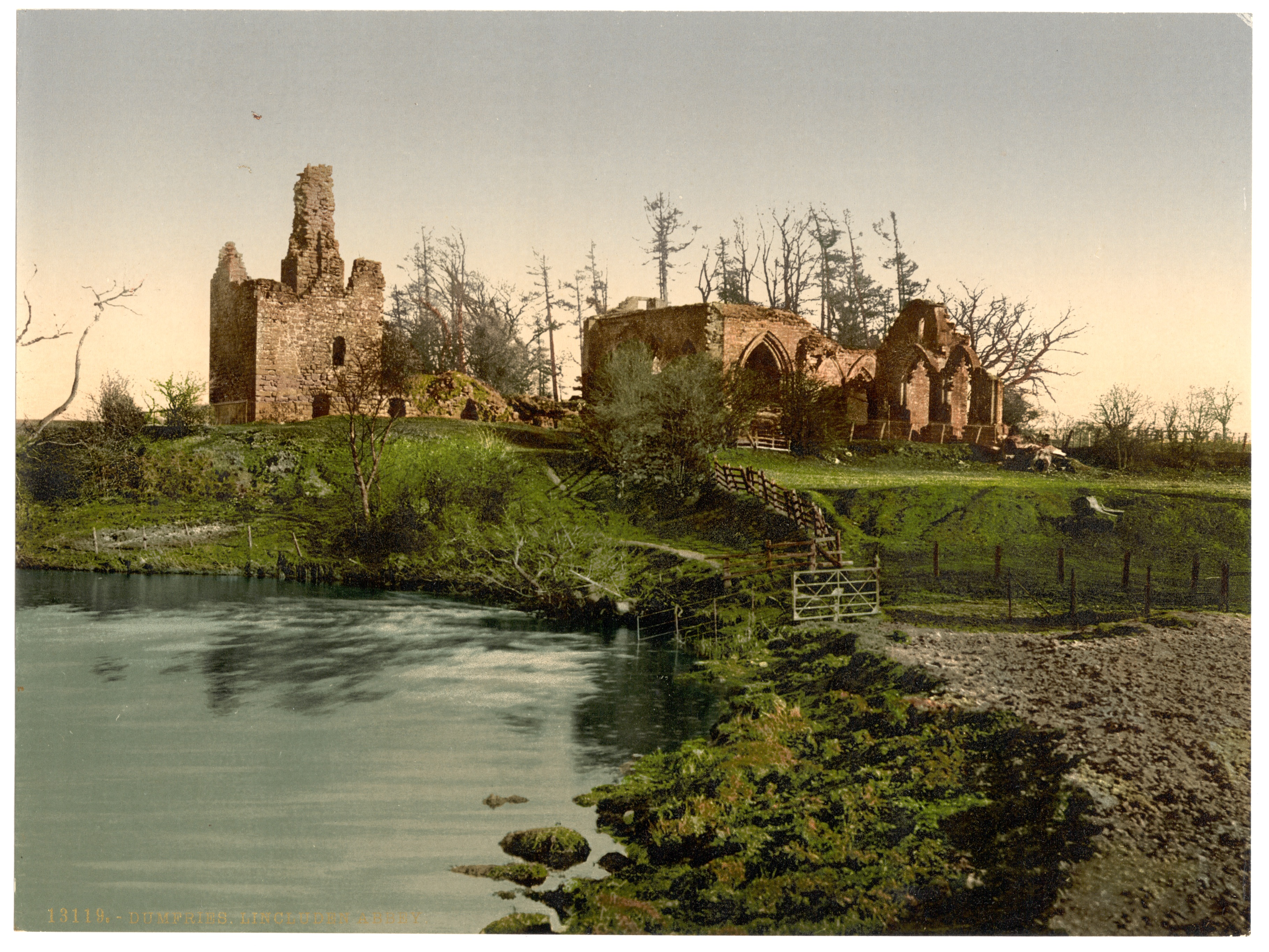
- Lincluden Abbey, ca. 1890–1900

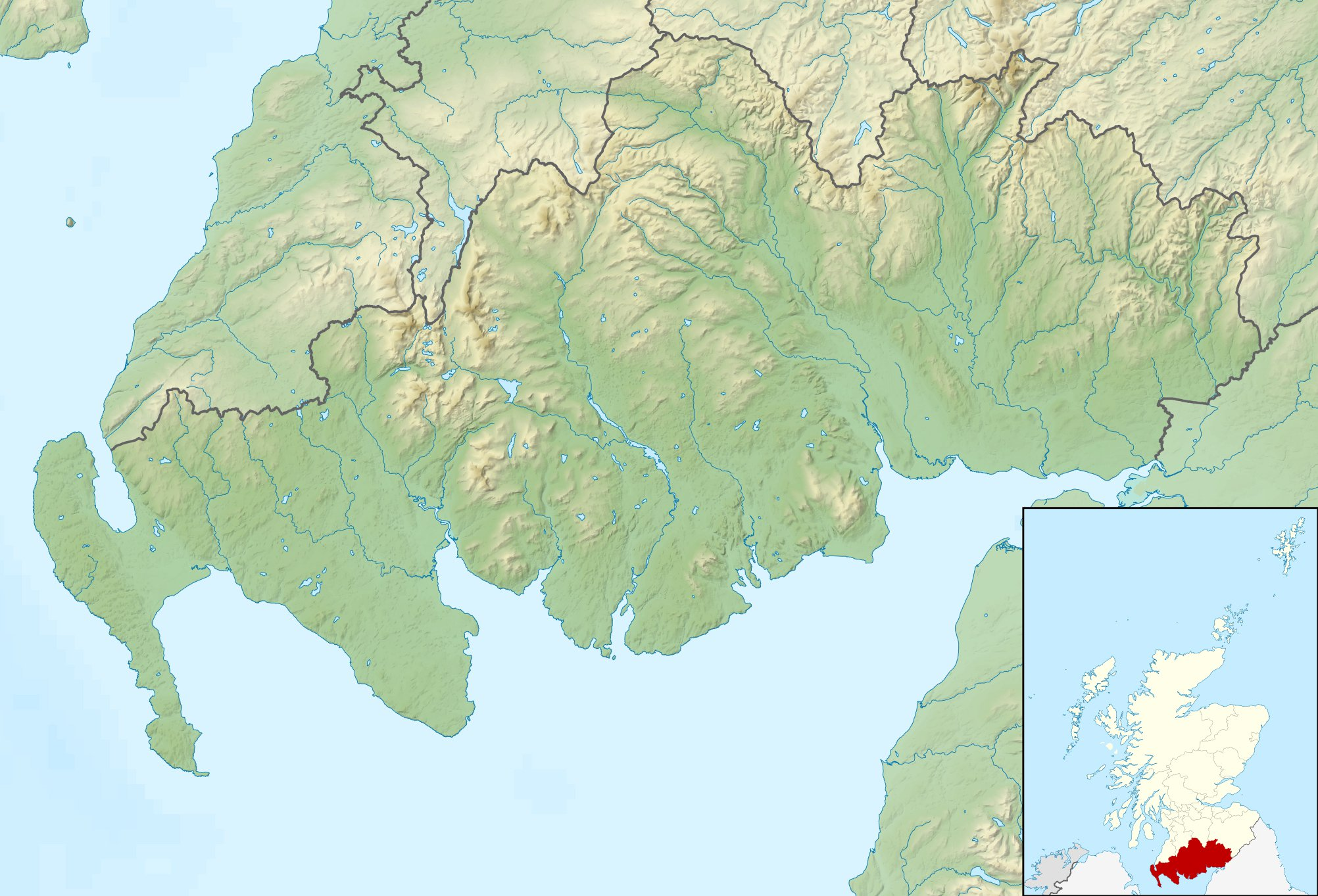
- Location within Scotland Location within Dumfries and Galloway

Religion
- Governing body: Historic Environment Scotland
- Status: Abandoned c.1700s Scheduled monument 27 April 1920

Location
- Location: Dumfries, Scotland
- Interactive map of Lincluden Collegiate Church
- Coordinates: 55.08519°N 3.62063°W

Architecture
- Architect: John Morow
- Type: Church
- Style: Late Gothic
- Founder: Uchtred and Gille Brigte
- Established: c.1160; 866 years ago (as priory) c.1389-1400 (as collegiate church)
- Materials: Stone

Lincluden Collegiate Church, known earlier as Lincluden Priory or Lincluden Abbey (the name by which it is still known locally), is a ruined religious house, situated in the historic county of Dumfries to the north of the Royal Burgh of Dumfries, Scotland. Situated in a bend of Cluden Water, at its confluence with the River Nith, the ruins are on the site of the Bailey of the very early Lincluden Castle, as are those of the later Lincluden Tower. This religious house was founded circa 1160 and was used for various purposes, until its abandonment around 1700. The remaining ruins are protected as a scheduled monument.

== Etymology ==
The name Lincluden has a Brittonic origin. The second element derives from the nearby Cluden Water. The first element may be Brittonic *lann (Welsh llan, 'parish'), or *linn, "pool, lake" (Welsh llyn).

== Priory of Lincluden ==
=== Foundation ===
The foundation of the priory is accredited to Uchtred (d.1174) who had co-ruled Galloway with his brother Gille Brigte. Uchtred did not have the benefit of the relative peace of his father's reign in Galloway. Fergus of Galloway (d.1161) had founded such establishments such as Soulseat Abbey, St Mary's Isle Priory, Dundrennan Abbey, the foundation at Kirkcudbright (Kirk of St. Cuthbert) and re-established the foundation at Whithorn, the historic community of St Ninian. Uchtred's focus of power was in eastern Galloway, while his brother's was in the west. Their reigns were marked by turbulent relationships between themselves, the Irish Kings of Ailech, the King of Scots, William the Lyon, and the King of England, Henry II. Lincluden was the only monastic house that Uchtred would found, meeting his death at the hand of his brother in 1174.

Prior to the foundation of Lincluden, there had been only been houses of Monks in Galloway, Uchtred's new house was the first nunnery within the Lordship. The first intake of religieuses were probably Cluniac sisters from France or England, later being supplemented by local novices.

=== Douglas patronage ===
In the late 14th century the area became part of the fief of Archibald the Grim, Lord of Galloway, and latterly 3rd Earl of Douglas. Using claims that the nuns at Lincluden had reputedly broken their vows of chastity and were guilty of licentious behaviour, of which there was no proof, sat in judgement over them and found them guilty. He dismissed the nuns from the priory. Earl Archibald ordered the construction of a new church, and set up a College consisting of a Provost and twelve Canons.

Following the capture of Archibald Douglas, 4th Earl of Douglas at Battle of Homildon Hill, and his later capture at the Battle of Shrewsbury, the Earl spent some time as a prisoner of Henry IV of England where he struck up a friendship with the King. This is evidenced by an open letter of 20 April 1408 from Henry to all his northern castellans. This forbids them, should they enter Scotland for military purposes, from harming or damaging persons or property pertaining to the College of Lincluden for a period of three years.

Earl Archibald and his successors spent a great deal of money on ornamenting the church, and there are many fine armorial carvings still within the ruins. Still extant is the tomb of Princess Margaret, Countess of Douglas and Duchess of Touraine, the daughter of Robert III of Scotland and wife of Archibald Douglas, 4th Earl of Douglas.

The buildings survived destruction at the Reformation in 1560. The last Mass was celebrated on Christmas Day 1585, organised by Lord Maxwell. The last provost, Robert Douglas, left about 1590, ownership then passed to the Catholic Maxwells of Terregles. The collegiate church's domestic ranges were converted into a tower house, which was abandoned by the late 1600s.

Thomas Pennant in his A Tour of Scotland, and Voyage to the Hebrides in 1772 wrote, (of Princess Margaret's tomb) " her bones till lately, were scattered about in a most indecent manner by some wretches who broke open the repository in search of treasure."

In 1882 the owner Capt Maxwell of Terregles had the ruins cleaned up and fenced off and a caretaker installed in lodge on site. In 1922 the ruins were taken into state care.

In recent years the ruins have again suffered from vandalism. It was reported that used engine oil had been poured over the effigy of Princess Margaret. Following this incident the effigy was removed in 1999 for conservation and protection and replaced with a fibreglass replica.

== Robert Burns at Lincluden ==
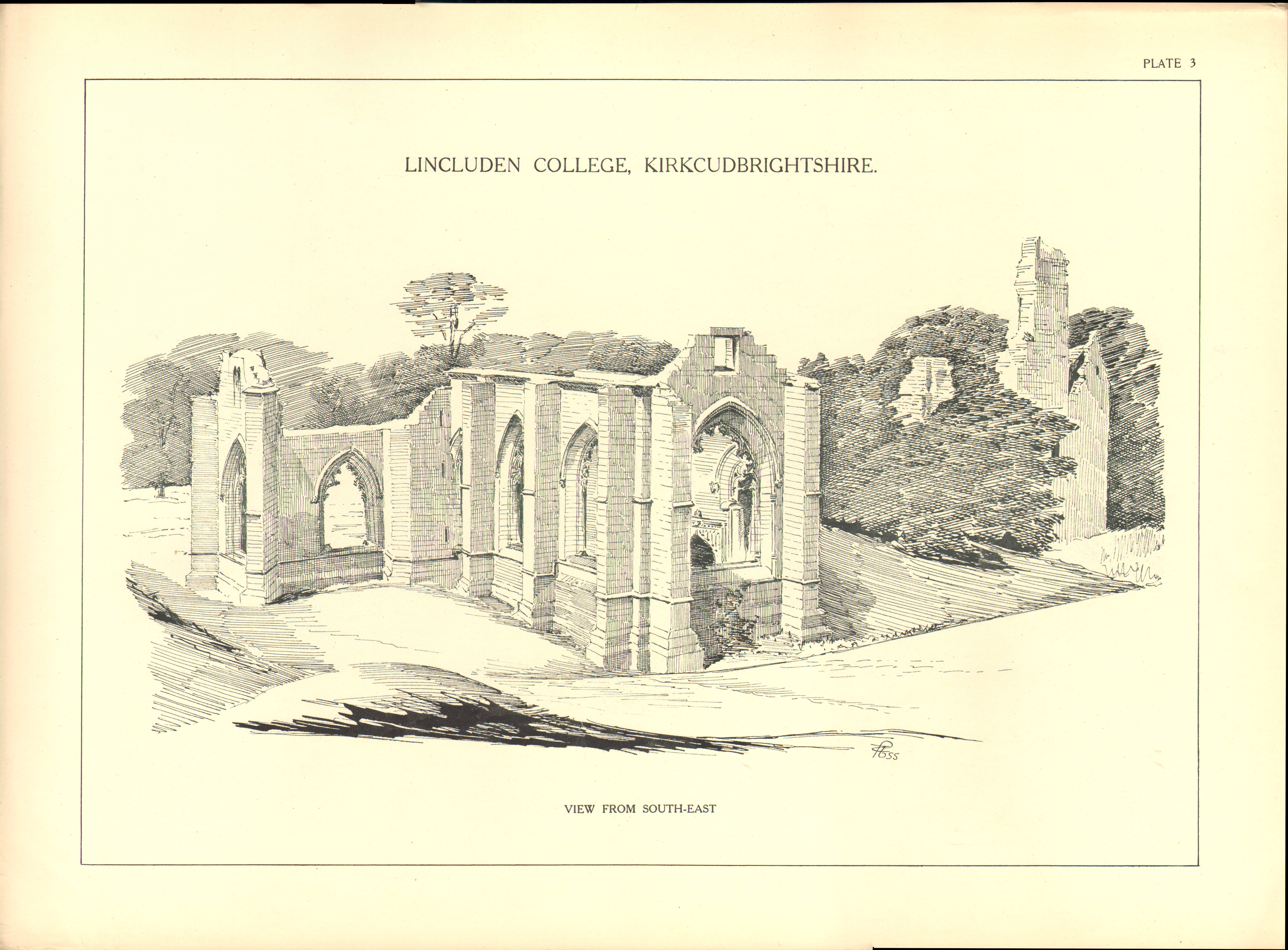
View from south-east, 1923

Robert Burns visited Lincluden and was inspired to write a song " The Minstrel of Lincluden", (1794), the first verse of which is:-

As I stood by yon roofless tower, /Where the wa'flow'r scents the dewy air,/Where the howlet mourns in her ivy bower,/And tells the midnight moon her care.

Burns also wrote the song, ''Ca' the Yowes to the Knowes' at Lincluden.

Yonder Clouden's silent towers,/Where, at moonshine's midnight hours,/O'er the dewy-bending flowers,/Fairies dance sae cheery./Ca' the yowes to the knowes.

Robert Louis Stevenson visited with his father in September 1873 while on their walking tour of Carrick and Galloway.

== Burials ==
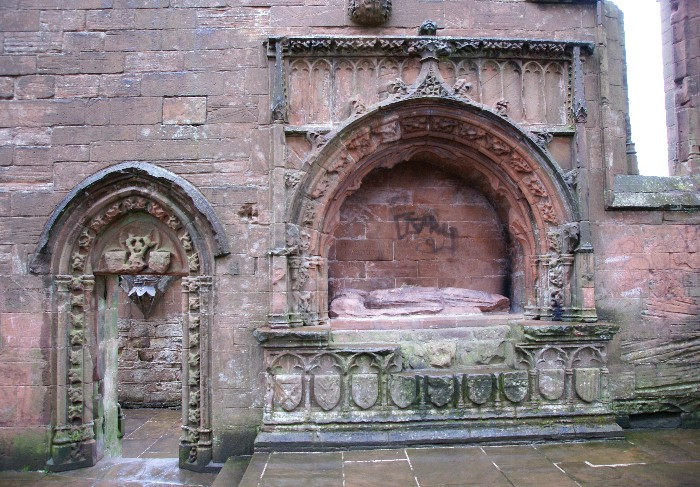
Lincluden Collegiate Church, tomb of Princess Margaret

- Uchtred of Galloway (c. 1120 –1174) founder of the convent.
- Archibald the Grim (died at Threave Castle 1400), founder of the collegiate church.
- Princess Margaret, (died 1450) Countess of Douglas daughter of Robert III and wife of Archibald Douglas, Duke of Touraine, 4th Earl of Douglas.
- Alexander Carnys or Cairns, 2nd Provost of Lincluden, (1408-1413), died in 1422 and buried in the south transept chapel, the inscription on his slabstone, 'Hic iacet Magister Alexander de Carnys calcatis pedibus prece subveniatis'.
- Alexander Couper, Mason, 1588.
