= Kingdom of Alba =

Medieval kingdom in Scotland

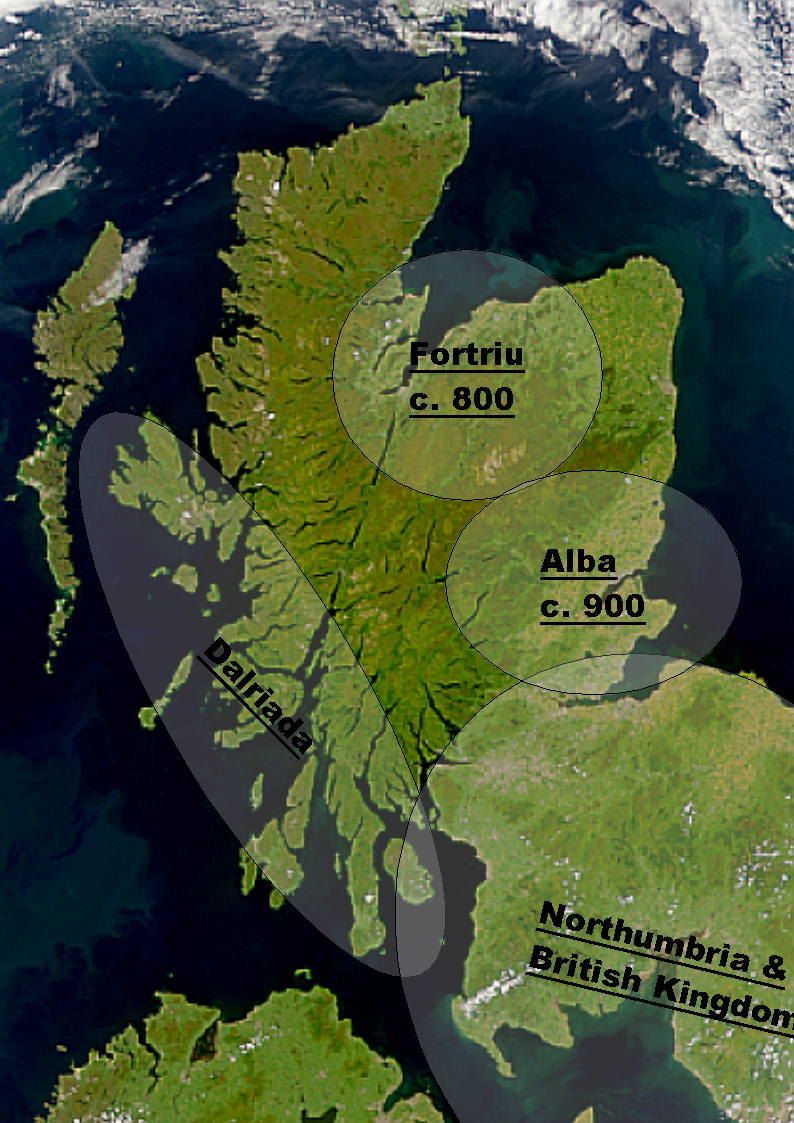
Political centres in Scotland in the early Middle Ages

The Kingdom of Alba (Latin: Scotia; Scottish Gaelic: Alba) was the Kingdom of Scotland between the deaths of Donald II in 900 and of Alexander III in 1286. The latter's death led indirectly to an invasion of Scotland by Edward I of England in 1296 and the First War of Scottish Independence.

Alba included Dalriada, but initially excluded large parts of the present-day Scottish Lowlands, which were then divided between Strathclyde and Northumbria as far north as the Firth of Forth. Fortriu, a Pictish kingdom in the north, was added to Alba in the tenth century.

Until the early 13th century, Moray was not considered part of Alba, which was seen as extending only between the Firth of Forth and the River Spey.

The name of Alba is one of convenience, as throughout this period both the ruling and lower classes of the kingdom were predominantly Pictish-Gaels, later Pictish-Gaels and Scoto-Normans. This differs markedly from the period of the House of Stuart, beginning in 1371, in which the ruling classes of the kingdom mostly spoke Middle English, which later evolved into and came to be called Lowland Scots. There is no precise Gaelic equivalent for the English term "Kingdom of Alba", as the Gaelic term Rìoghachd na h-Alba means 'Kingdom of Scotland'. English-speaking scholars adapted the Gaelic name for Scotland to apply to a particular political period in Scottish history, during the High Middle Ages.

== Royal court ==
Little is known about the structure of the Scottish royal court in the period before the coming of the Normans to Scotland, before the reign of David I. A little more is known about the court of the later 12th and 13th centuries. In the words of Geoffrey Barrow, this court "was emphatically feudal, Frankish, non-Celtic in character". Some of the offices were Gaelic in origin, such as the Hostarius (later Usher or "Doorward"), the man in charge of the royal bodyguard, and the rannaire, the Gaelic-speaking member of the court whose job was to divide the food.

- The post of Seneschal, or dapifer (i.e. the Steward), had been hereditary since the reign of David I. The Steward had responsibility for the royal household and its management (see High Steward of Scotland);
- The Chancellor was in charge of the royal chapel. The latter was the king's place of worship, but as it happened, was associated with the royal scribes, responsible for keeping records. Usually, the chancellor was a clergyman, and usually he held this office before being promoted to a bishopric (see Lord Chancellor of Scotland);
- The Chamberlain had control and responsibility over royal finances (see Chamberlain of Scotland);
- The Constable was also hereditary since the reign of David I and was in charge of the crown's military resources (see Lord High Constable of Scotland);
- The Butler (see Butler of Scotland);
- The Marshal or marischal. The marischal differed from the constable in that he was more specialised, responsible for and in charge of the royal cavalry forces (see Earl Marischal).

In the 13th century, all the other offices tended to be hereditary, with the exception of the Chancellor. The royal household of course came with numerous other offices. The most important was probably the aforementioned hostarius, but there were others such as the royal hunters, the royal foresters and the cooks (dispensa or spence).

== Kings of Alba ==
=== Donald II and Constantine II ===
King Donald II was the first man to have been called rí Alban (i.e. King of Alba), when he died at Dunnottar in 900. This meant king of Caledonia or Scotland. All his predecessors bore the style of either King of the Picts or King of Fortriu. Such an apparent innovation in the Gaelic chronicles is occasionally taken to spell the birth of Scotland, but there is nothing special about his reign that might confirm this. Donald had the nickname dásachtach. This simply meant a madman, or in early Irish law, a man not in control of his functions and hence without legal culpability. The reason was possibly the restlessness of his reign, continually spent fighting battles against Vikings. It is possible he gained his unpopularity by violating the rights of the church or through high taxes, but it is not known for certain. However, his extremely negative nickname makes him an unlikely founder of Scotland.

Donald's successor Constantine II (Causantín mac Aeda) is more often regarded as a key figure in the formation of Alba. (Note: e.g. BBC documentary In Search of Scotland, ep. 2.) Constantine reigned for nearly half a century, fighting many battles. When he lost at Brunanburh, he was clearly discredited and retired as a Culdee monk at St. Andrews. Despite this, the Prophecy of Berchán is full of praise for him, and in this respect is in line with the views of other sources. Constantine is credited in later tradition as the man who, with Bishop Ceallach of St. Andrews, brought the Catholic Church in Scotland into conformity with that of the larger Gaelic world, although it is not known exactly what this means. There had been Gaelic bishops in St. Andrews for two centuries, and Gaelic churchmen were amongst the oldest features of Caledonian Christianity. The reform may have been organizational, or some sort of purge of certain unknown and perhaps disliked legacies of Pictish ecclesiastical tradition. However, other than these factors, it is difficult to appreciate fully the importance of Constantine's reign.

=== Malcolm I to Malcolm II ===
The period between the accession of Malcolm I (Maol Caluim Mac Domhnuill) and Malcolm II (Maol Caluim Mac Cionaodha) is marked by good relations with the Wessex rulers of England, intense internal dynastic disunity and, despite this, relatively successful expansionary policies. Some time after an English invasion of cumbra land (Old English for either Strathclyde or Cumbria or both) by King Edmund of England in 945, the English king handed the province over to king Malcolm I on condition of a permanent alliance. Some time in the reign of King Indulf (Idulb mac Causantín, 954–962), the Scots captured the fortress called oppidum Eden, i.e. almost certainly Edinburgh. It was the first Scottish foothold in Lothian. The Scots had probably had some authority in Strathclyde since the later part of the 9th century, but the kingdom kept its own rulers, and it is not clear that the Scots were always strong enough to enforce their authority. In fact, one of Indulf's successors, Cuilén (Cuilén mac Ilduilbh), died at the hands of the men of Strathclyde, perhaps while trying to enforce his authority. King Kenneth II (Cionaodh Mac Maol Chaluim, 971–995) began his reign by invading Britannia (possibly Strathclyde), perhaps as an early assertion of his authority, and perhaps also as a traditional Gaelic crechríghe (lit. "royal prey"), the rite by which a king secured the success of his reign with an inauguration raid in the territory of a historical enemy.

The reign of Malcolm I (942 or 943–954) also marks the first known tensions between the Scottish kingdom and Moray, the old heartland of the Scoto-Pictish kingdom of Fortriu. The Chronicle of the Kings of Alba reported that King Malcolm "went into Moray and slew Ceallach." The same source tells us that King Malcolm was killed by the Moravians. This is the first definite sign of tension between the Cenél nGabráin and Cenél Loairn, two kin-groups claiming descent from different ancestors of Erc. During the reign of Macbeth (Mac Beathadh Mac Findláich), and his successor Lulach (Lulach Mac Gille Comhgháin), the Moray-based Cenél Loairn ruled all Scotland.

The reign of Malcolm II saw the final incorporation of these territories. The critical year perhaps was 1018, when King Malcolm II defeated the Northumbrians at the Battle of Carham. In the same year, King Owain Foel died, leaving his kingdom to his overlord Malcolm. A meeting with King Canute of Denmark and England, probably about 1031, seems to have further secured these conquests, although the exact nature of Scottish rule over the Lothian and Scottish Borders area was not fully realised until the conquest and annexation of that province during the Wars of Independence.

=== Duncan I to Alexander I ===
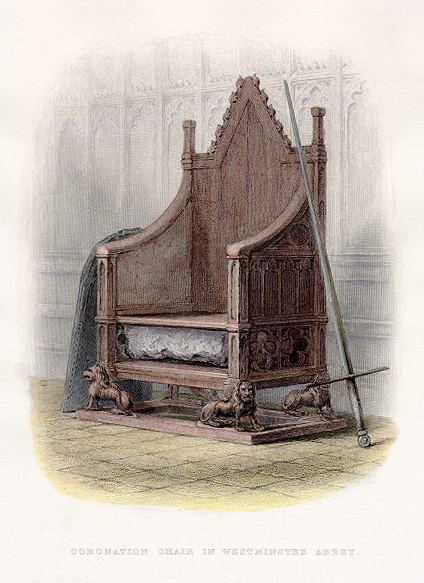
The Stone of Scone in the Coronation Chair at Westminster Abbey, 1855. It was the ceremonial coronation stone of Scotland's Gaelic kings, similar to the Irish Lia Fáil.

The period between the accession of King Duncan I (Donnchadh Mac Críonáin, 1034) and the death of Alexander I (1124) was the last before the coming of the Normans to Scotland. In some respects, the reign of King Malcolm III (Maol Caluim Mac Donnchaidh) prefigured the changes which took place in the reigns of the French-speaking kings David I and William I, although native reaction to the manner of Duncan II's (Donnchad mac Máel Coluim) accession perhaps put these changes back somewhat.

King Duncan I's reign was a military failure. He was defeated by the native English at Durham in 1040, and was subsequently toppled. Duncan had only been related to previous rulers through his mother Bethoc, daughter of Malcolm II, who had married Crínán, the lay abbot of Dunkeld (and probably Mormaer of Atholl too). At a location called Bothganowan (or Bothgowan, Bothgofnane, Bothgofuane, meaning "Blacksmith's Hut" in old Gaelic, today Pitgaveny near Elgin), the Mormaer of Moray, Macbeth defeated and killed Duncan, and took the kingship for himself. After Macbeth's successor Lulach, another Moravian, all kings of Scotland were Duncan's descendants. For this reason, Duncan's reign is often remembered positively, while Macbeth is villanised. Eventually, William Shakespeare gave fame to this medieval equivalent of propaganda by further immortalising both men in his play Macbeth. Macbeth's reign however was successful enough that he had the security to go on pilgrimage to Rome.

It was Malcolm III who acquired the nickname (as did his successors) "Canmore" (Ceann Mór, "Great Chief"), and not his father Duncan, who did more to create the successful dynasty which ruled Scotland for the following two centuries. Part of the success was the huge number of children he had. Through two marriages, firstly to the Norwegian Ingibiorg Finnsdottir, and secondly to the English princess Margaret of Wessex, Malcolm had perhaps a dozen children. Malcolm and, if we believe later hagiography, his wife, introduced the first Benedictine monks to Scotland. However, despite having a royal Anglo-Saxon wife, Malcolm spent more of his reign conducting slave raids against the English, adding to the woes of that people in the aftermath of the Norman Conquest of England and the Harrying of the North, as Marianus Scotus tells us:

The Scots and French devastated the English; and [the English] were dispersed and died of hunger; and were compelled to eat human flesh: and to this end, to kill men, and to salt and dry them.

Malcolm died in one of these raids, in 1093. In the aftermath of his death, the Norman rulers of England began their interference in the Scottish kingdom. This interference was prompted by Malcolm's raids and attempts to forge claims for his successors to the English kingship. He had married the sister of the native English claimant to the English throne, Edgar Ætheling, and had given most of his children by this marriage Anglo-Saxon royal names. Moreover, he had given support to many native English nobles, including Edgar himself, and had been supporting native English insurrections against their Norman rulers. In 1080, King William the Conqueror sent his son on an invasion of Scotland. The invasion got as far as Falkirk, on the boundary between Scotland-proper and Lothian, and Malcolm submitted to the authority of the king, giving his oldest son Duncan as a hostage. This submission perhaps gives the reason why Malcolm did not give his last two sons, Alexander and David, Anglo-Saxon royal names.

Malcolm's natural successor was his brother, Donalbane (Domhnall Bán Mac Donnchaidh), as Malcolm's sons were young. However, the Norman state to the south sent Malcolm's son Duncan to take the kingship. In the ensuing conflict, the Anglo-Saxon Chronicle tells us that:

Donnchadh went to Scotland with what aid he could get of the English and French, and deprived his kinsman Domhnall of the Kingdom, and was received as King. But afterwards some of the Scots gathered themselves together, and slew almost all of his followers; and he himself escaped with few. Thereafter they were reconciled on the condition that he should never again introduce English or French into the land. (Note: Normanists tend to sideline or downplay opposition amongst the native Scots to Canmore authority, but much work has been done on the topic recently, McDonald (2003b),)

Duncan was killed the same year, 1094, and Donalbane resumed sole kingship. However, the Norman state sent another of Malcolm's sons, Edgar to take the kingship. Anglo-Norman policy worked, because thereafter all kings of Scotland succeeded, not without opposition of course, under a system very closely corresponding with the primogeniture that operated in the French-speaking world. The reigns of both Edgar and his brother and successor Alexander are comparatively obscure. The former's most notable act was to send a camel (or perhaps an elephant) to his fellow Gael Muircheartach Ua Briain, High King of Ireland. When Edgar died, Alexander took the kingship, while his youngest brother David became Prince of "Cumbria" and ruler of Lothian.

=== Norman Kings: David I to Alexander III ===
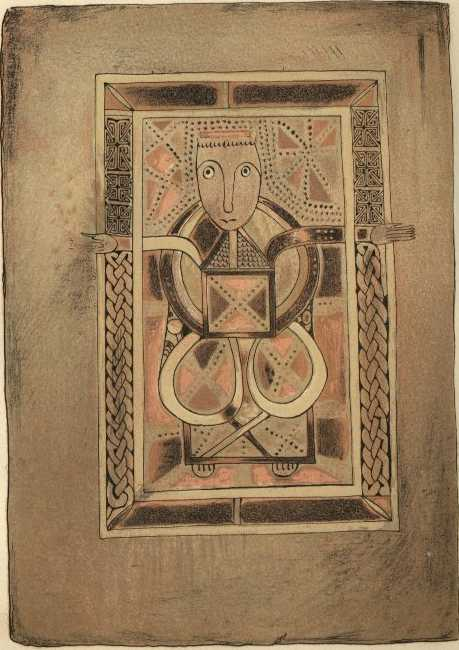
Book of Deer, folio 29v contains a portrait of the Evangelist Luke; a list of privileges and legends were written in Gaelic and Latin in the margins, in lowland Buchan in the reign of David I.

The period between the accession of David I and the death of Alexander III was marked by dependence upon, and relatively good relations with, the Kings of the English. It was also a period of historical expansion for the Scottish kingdom, and witnessed the successful imposition of royal authority across most of the modern country. The period was one of a great deal of historical change, and much of the modern historiographical literature is devoted to this change (especially G.W.S. Barrow), part of a more general phenomenon which has been called the "Europeanisation of Europe". More recent works though, while acknowledging that a great deal of change did take place, emphasise that this period was in fact also one of great continuity (e.g. Cynthia Neville, Richard Oram, Dauvit Broun, and others). Indeed, the period is subject to many misconceptions. For instance, English did not spread all over the Lowlands (see language section), and neither did English names; and, moreover even by 1300, most native lordships remained in native Gaelic hands, with only a minority passing to men of French or Anglo-French origin; furthermore, the Normanisation and imposition of royal authority in Scotland was not a peaceful process, but in fact cumulatively more violent than the Norman Conquest of England; additionally, the Scottish kings were not independent monarchs, but vassals to the King of the English, although not "legally" for Scotland north of the Forth.

The important changes which did occur include the extensive establishment of burghs (see section), in many respects Scotland's first urban institutions; the feudalisation, or more accurately, the Francization of aristocratic martial, social and inheritance customs; the de-Scotticisation of ecclesiastical institutions; the imposition of royal authority over most of modern Scotland; and the drastic drift at the top level from traditional Gaelic culture, so that after David I, the Kingship of the Scots resembled more closely the kingship of the French and English, than it did the lordship of any large-scale Gaelic kingdom in Ireland.

After David I, and especially in the reign of William I, Scotland's kings became ambivalent about, if not hostile towards, the culture of most of their subjects. As Walter of Coventry tells us:

The modern kings of Scotia count themselves as Frenchmen, in race, manners, language and culture; they keep only Frenchmen in their household and following, and have reduced the Scots [=Gaels north of the Forth] to utter servitude.

— Memoriale Fratris Walteri de Coventria

The ambivalence of the kings was matched to a certain extent by their subjects. In the aftermath of William's capture at Alnwick in 1174, the Scots turned on their king's English-speaking and French-speaking subjects. William of Newburgh related the events:

When [King William] was given over into the hands of the enemy, God's vengeance permitted not also that his most evil army should go away unhurt. For when they learned of the King's capture the barbarians at first were stunned, and desisted from spoil; and presently, as if driven by furies, the sword which they had taken up against their enemy and which was now drunken with innocent blood they turned against their own army. Now there was in the same army a great number of English; for the towns and burghs of the Scottish realm are known to be inhabited by English. On the occasion therefore of this opportunity the Scots declared their hatred against them, innate, though masked through fear of the king; and as many as they fell upon they slew, the rest who could escape fleeing back to the royal castles.

— "Historia Rerum", Chronicles of the Reigns of Stephen, Henry II, and Richard I

Walter Bower, writing a few centuries later albeit, wrote about the same event:

At that time after the capture of their king, the Scots together with the Galwegians, in the mutual slaughter that took place, killed their English and French compatriots without mercy or pity, making frequent attacks on them. At that time also there took place a most wretched and widespread persecution of the English both in Scotland and Galloway. So intense was it that no consideration was shown to the sex of any, but all were cruelly killed ...

— Scotichronicon, VIII, chapter 22, pp. 30–40.

Opposition to the Scottish kings in this period was indeed hard. The first instance is perhaps the revolt of Óengus of Moray, the Mormaer of Moray, the crushing of which led to the colonisation of Moray by foreign burgesses, and Franco-Flemish and Anglo-French aristocrats. Rebellions continued throughout the 12th century and into the 13th. Important resistors to the expansionary Scottish kings were Somhairle Mac Gille Brighdhe, Fergus of Galloway, Gille Brigte of Galloway and Harald Maddadsson, along with two kin-groups known today as the MacHeths and the Meic Uilleim. The latter claimed descent from king Donnchadh II, through his son William, and rebelled for no less a reason than the Scottish throne itself. The threat was so grave that, after the defeat of the MacWilliams in 1230, the Scottish crown ordered the public execution of the baby girl who happened to be the last MacWilliam. This was how the Lanercost Chronicle relates the fate of this last MacWilliam:

The same Mac-William's daughter, who had not long left her mother's womb, innocent as she was, was put to death, in the burgh of Forfar, in view of the market place, after a proclamation by the public crier. Her head was struck against the column of the market cross, and her brains dashed out.

Many of these resistors collaborated, and drew support not just in the peripheral Gaelic regions of Galloway, Moray, Ross and Argyll, but also from eastern "Scotland-proper", Ireland and Mann. By the end of the 12th century, the Scottish kings had acquired the authority and ability to draw in native Gaelic lords outside their previous zone of control to do their work, the most famous examples being Lochlann, Lord of Galloway and Fearchar Mac an t-Sagairt.

Such accommodation assisted expansion to the Scandinavian-ruled lands of the west. Uilleam, the native Mormaer of Ross, was a pivotal figure in the expansion of the Scottish kingdom into the Hebrides, as was Ailéan mac Ruaidhrí, the key pro-Scottish Hebridean chief, who married his daughter to Uilleam, the Mormaer of Mar. The Scottish king was able to draw on the support of Alan, Lord of Galloway, the master of the Irish Sea region, and was able to make use of the Galwegian ruler's enormous fleet of ships. The Mormaers of Lennox forged links with the Argyll chieftains, bringing a kin-group such as the Campbells into the Scottish fold. Cumulatively, by the reign of Alexander III, the Scots were in a strong position to annexe the remainder of the western seaboard, which they did in 1266, with the Treaty of Perth. Orkney too was coming into the Scottish fold. In the 12th century, Mormaer Matad's son Harald was established on the Orkney Earldom. Thereafter, the Orkney earl (also Mormaer of Caithness) was just as much a Scottish vassal as a Norwegian one. Descendants of the Gaelic Mormaers of Angus ruled Orkney for much of the 13th century. In the early 14th century, another Scottish Gaelic noble, Maol Íosa V of Strathearn became Earl of Orkney, although formal Scottish sovereignty over the Northern Isles did not come for more than another century.

The conquest of the west, the creation of the Mormaerdom of Carrick in 1186 and the absorption of the Lordship of Galloway after the Galwegian revolt of 1135 meant that the number and proportion of Gaelic speakers under the rule of the Scottish king actually increased, and perhaps even doubled, in the so-called Norman period. It was the Gaels and Gaelicised warriors of the new west, and the power they offered, that enabled King Robert I (himself a Gaelicised Scoto-Norman of Carrick) to emerge victorious during the Wars of Independence, which followed soon after the death of Alexander III.
