= Uhtred of Galloway =

Scottish ruler (1120–1174)

Uhtred
- Lord of Galloway
- Reign: 1161 – 1174
- Co-regnant: Gille Brigte of Galloway
- Born: c. 1120
- Died: 22 September 1174 (aged 53–54)
- Spouse: Gunhilda of Dunbar
- Issue: Lochlann of Galloway; Eve of Galloway; Christina; Fergus; Unknown son
- Father: Fergus of Galloway

Uhtred mac Fergus (c. 1120 – 22 September 1174) was Lord of Galloway from 1161 to 1174, ruling jointly with his brother Gille Brigte (Gilbert). They were sons of Fergus of Galloway; it was believed that they were half brothers, but Duncan of Carrick was addressed as cousin by the English King, as was Uchtred. (The term "cousin" in address does not necessarily connote a family tie; it was used between even minor "kings" to suggest that sender and receiver were of mutually considerable rank). Their mother's name is not known for sure, but she must have been one of the many illegitimate daughters of Henry I of England, most likely Elizabeth Fitzroy.

== Career ==
As a boy he was sent as a hostage to the court of King Malcolm IV of Scotland. When his father, Prince Fergus, died in 1161, Uchtred was made co-ruler of Galloway along with Gilla Brigte. They participated in the disastrous invasion of Northumberland under William I of Scotland in 1174. King William was captured, and the Galwegians rebelled, taking the opportunity to slaughter the Normans and English in their land. During this time Uchtred was brutally mutilated, blinded, castrated, and killed by his brother Gille Brigte and Gille Brigte's son, Máel Coluim. Gille Brigte then seized control of the whole of Galloway.

== Marriage and children ==
Uchtred had married Gunhilda, and they were the parents of (at least):

- Lochlann of Galloway (d. 1200; also known as Roland), who became a powerful regional magnate
- Eve of Galloway, wife of Walter de Berkeley
- Christina, wife of William de Brus, 3rd Lord of Annandale, who became an ancestor of the Bruce dynasty, linking them to the Wars of Scottish Independence and the eventual rise of Robert the Bruce and the Scottish monarchy.
- Fergus (fl. 1196), died after 1213, knight, identified as 'brother of Roland' in 1196 charter
- Duegald, died 30 September 1185, in conflict with Gillecolm, and founder of Clan MacDowall

Their descendants became prominent figures in the Wars of Scottish Independence, including their grandson Robert the Bruce.

=== Gunhilda ===
Gunhilda of Dunbar (also spelled Gunnild or Gunhild; c. 1120 – 12 May 1166) was a 12th-century Scottish noblewoman. She married Uhtred, becoming the matriarch of a branch that influenced the Anglo-Norman and Gaelic-Norse frontier of medieval Scotland. Gunhilda was born around 1120 in Dunbar, the daughter of Waltheof of Allerdale — son of Gospatric, Earl of Northumbria — and his wife Sigrid. Gunhilda died on 12 May 1166 in Dunbar.

== Sources ==
- Taylor, James. The Pictorial History of Scotland, 1859
- John of Fordun (chronicler)
- Roger of Hoveden (chronicler)

Preceded by Fergus of Galloway	Lord of Galloway; 1161–1174	Succeeded by Gille Brigte
