= Abbot of Soulseat =

The Abbot of Soulseat was the head of the Premonstratensian (originally Cistercian) monastic community of Soulseat Abbey in Galloway. The following is a list of abbots and commendators:

== List of Cistercian abbots ==
- Michael of Bangor, fl. c. 1148

== List of Premonstratensian abbots ==
- Michael of Bangor
- None of the abbots before 1273 known by name
- John, 1273
- More than a century with no known abbot
- Fionnlagh (Finlay), 1386–1393
- Patrick McChaquhirky, 1452–1458
- Gilbert MacUlnan (MacWilnane), 1458-1464 x 1486
- Patrick MacCulloch 1486
- Quentin Vaus 1493–1527
- David Vaus 1525–1532

== List of commendators ==
- James Johnstone of Wamphray, 1532-1545/6
- John Johnstone I, 1545–1567
  - Opposed by James Kennedy, 1548, 1555
- John Johnstone II, 1584–1598
- John Kennedy, 1598
- John Johnstone III, 1599
- William Adair, 1601
- John Hamilton, 1612–1630

== Bibliography ==
- Watt, D.E.R. & Shead, N.F. (eds.), The Heads of Religious Houses in Scotland from the 12th to the 16th Centuries, The Scottish Records Society, New Series, Volume 24, (Edinburgh, 2001), p. 204-6

== See also ==
- Soulseat Abbey
