= Scoto-Norman =

Fusion of Scottish and Anglo-Norman origins

The term Scoto-Norman (also Franco-Scottish or Franco-Gaelic) is used to describe people, families, institutions and archaeological artifacts that are partly Scottish (in some sense) and partly Anglo-Norman (in some sense), after the Norman Conquest. It is used to refer to people or things of Norman, Anglo-Norman, French or even Flemish or Breton origin, but who are associated with Scotland in the Middle Ages like Scoto-Anglo-Saxon. It is also used for any of these things where they exhibit syncretism between French or Anglo-French culture on the one hand and Gaelic culture on the other.

For instance, the Kings of Scotland between the reign of the David I and the Stewart period are often described as Scoto-Norman. A classic case of Gaelic and French cultural syncretism would be Lochlann, Lord of Galloway, who used both a Gaelic (Lochlann) and French name (Roland), and kept followers of both languages. Another example of a Scoto-Norman would be Robert the Bruce.

The term is used by historians as an alternative to Anglo-Norman when that term pertains to Scotland. It was first used in 1829, in P. F. Tytler's History of Scotland.

== See also ==
- Anglo-Norman
- Cambro-Norman
- Hiberno-Norman
- Norse-Gaels
