= Battle of Mam Garvia =

1187 battle in Northern Scotland

Coordinates: 57.597°N 4.428°W

The Battle of Mam Garvia, took place in 1187 in Northern Scotland. Domnall Meic Uilleim had resisted the King of Scots since at least 1179, he even had a claim to the throne as a grandson of King Donnchad II of Scotland. Lochlann, Lord of Galloway led an army north where according to Roger of Hoveden they defeated the Meic Uilleim, slew Domnall and cut off his head and carried it south to present it to King William. The actual site of the battle has been quoted as being either in Ross or near Moray, lately it has been reasoned to be in Strath Garve near Dingwall.

== Sources ==
- Howden, R Gesta Regis Henrici Secundi Benedicti Abbatis, ed. W. Stubbs (Rolls Series, London, 1867).
