= Soulseat Abbey =

Abbey in Dumfries and Galloway, Scotland

Coordinates: 54.8874°N 4.9625°W

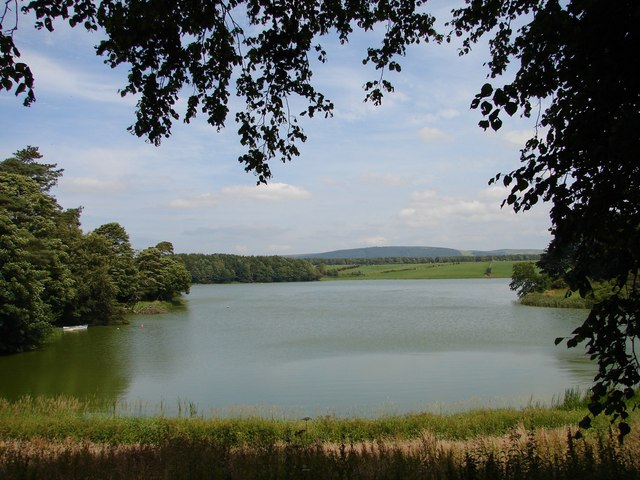
The west side of Soulseat Loch, from the south-west

Saulseat or Soulseat Abbey was a Premonstratensian monastic community located in Wigtownshire, Galloway, in the Gaelic-speaking south-west of Scotland.

== History ==
There is some evidence that Soulseat Abbey is Viride Stagnum ("green loch"), that is, the Cistercian monastery founded by St Malachy somewhere in Galloway in 1148. The name comes from the Gaelic word Sabhal, a word with many religious and monastic connotations. Perhaps because of Anglophone folk etymology, the name came to imply a connection to both Saul and the soul, taking the Latin form Sedes Animarum ("Seat of the Spirit").

Soulseat Loch takes its name from the Abbey, which was founded by Fergus, Lord of Galloway, for Premonstratensian canons regular, stood on a small peninsula in the loch. The abbey was apparently enclosed on the land side by a fosse or trench or canal which left it surrounded on all sides by water and therefore, relatively secure from attack of an enemy. Premonstratensian canons regular from Alnwick Abbey in Northumberland had founded Dryburgh Abbey, on the banks of the River Tweed on Martinmas 1150.

The site of Soulseat Abbey (now a mound with five 16th-century gravestones thereon) is on the promontory of a loch with a very narrow isthmus, thus perhaps fitting the description. The Premonstratensian establishment certainly occurred before the death of King Fergus of Galloway, which took place in 1161. The Obituary of Prémontré lists both King Fergus and Christian, bishop of Galloway (1154-86), as joint founders. Probably because of the abbey's cultural isolation from Lowland Scotland, almost none of the abbots are known by name before the 15th century. It is known though that the abbey suffered devastation from wars in the 14th century. Control of the abbey became secularized in the 15th century, and even more so after the Scottish Reformation. In 1630, it was taken over by the parsonage of Portpatrick. The site is now protected as a scheduled monument.

== See also ==
- Abbot of Soulseat, for a list of abbots and commendators

== Bibliography ==
- Anderson, A.O., Early Sources for Scottish History, 2 vols., vol. ii, pp. 208–9 (quoting St Bernard's Vita Sancti Malachaiae)
- Cowan, Ian B. & Easson, David E., Medieval Religious Houses: Scotland With an Appendix on the Houses in the Isle of Man, Second Edition, (London, 1976), pp. 78–9, 102-3
- Watt, D.E.R. & Shead, N.F. (eds.), The Heads of Religious Houses in Scotland from the 12th to the 16th Centuries, The Scottish Records Society, New Series, Volume 24, (Edinburgh, 2001), pp. 204–6
- T. Alistair Findlay, Chronological History of Soulseat Abbey, Scotland (accessed 26 January 2008): https://web.archive.org/web/20120209005602/http://www.premontre.org/subpages/loci/imagines/imsoulseat/Soulseat%20Chronological%20History.htm
