= Lochlann of Galloway =

Scottish lord

Lochlann of Galloway (died 19 December 1200), also known as Lochlan mac Uchtred and by his French name Roland fitz Uhtred, was the son and successor of Uchtred, Lord of Galloway as the "Lord" or "sub-king" of eastern Galloway.

== Family ==
Lochlann was the oldest son of Uchtred, Lord of Galloway and his wife Gunhilda of Dunbar, daughter of Waltheof of Allerdale. Lochlann (also called Roland) had four siblings—sisters Eve of Galloway (wife of Walter de Berkeley) and Christina (wife of William de Brus, 3rd Lord of Annandale), and two younger brothers, Fergus and another whose name is not known. Through their father Lochlann and his siblings were great-grandchildren of King Henry I of England. Through their mother they were descended from the house of Dunkeld.

Lochlann's father is considered to be the last living King of Galloway, which he ruled jointly with his brother, Gille Brigte, from 1161 to 1174. At this time Gille Brigte, brutally slew his brother, Uchtred, who was a strong ally of Scotland, and attempted to transfer Galloway over to English control. Gille Brigte offered the King of England tribute if the King would "remove them [the Galwegians] from the servitude of the king of Scotland" (Anderson, p. 258). However, when King Henry's delegation discovered the fate of Uchtred, Henry's cousin, they rejected the request. Gille Brigte was forced to come to terms with the two kings, and pay penalties for the death of his brother.

Lochlann of Galloway was likely a young adult at the time of his father's death at the hands of his uncle. He likely participated in King William of Scotland's disastrous invasion of Northumberland. After his father's death Lochlann made it plain he considered King William of Scotland his liege. Where his father had declared himself King of Galloway, after Gille Brigte's death in 1185 Lochlann became "Lord of Galloway". It is said his favourite title was yet to come, courtesy of his wife.

== Constable of the King of Scots ==
Lochlann, son of Uchtred, married Helena, daughter of Richard de Morville, and eventually his sole heir. The couple had at least one known son, Alan of Galloway. Richard de Morville, Constable of Scotland, died in 1189, all his sons having predeceased him. The title of Constable of Scotland and all his Scottish estates passed to Lochlann through his marriage to Helena. Her English inheritance appears to have not been so secure, for in 1200 Lochlann accompanied King William to pay homage to King John, and it is stated it was Lochlann's intention to discuss his wife's estates. "Constable of the King of Scots" was the title Lochlann preferred above all others, perhaps because it had not been sullied by his uncle. Lochlann of Galloway was in England at the time of his death in 1200. Alan of Galloway succeeded his father, to become Lord of Galloway, and by right of his mother, to become Constable of Scotland.

== Later life ==
After the death of his uncle Gille Brigte in 1185, Lochlann went about to seize the land of Gille Brigte's heirs. In this aim he had to defeat the men who would defy his authority in the name of Gille Brigte's heir. He seems to have done so, defeating the resistors, who were led by men called Gille Pátraic and Henric Cennédig. Yet resistance continued under a warrior called Gille Coluim of Galloway.

Lochlann's aims moreover encouraged the wrath of a more important political figure than any of the above. King Henry II of England was outraged. A few years before Gille Brigte's death, Henry had taken his son and successor Donnchad as a hostage. Hence Henry was the patron and protector of the man Lochlann was trying to disinherit. When King William of Scotland was ordered to visit Henry in southern England, William was told that Lochlann must be stopped. However, William and Lochlann were friends, and so in the end Henry himself brought an army to Carlisle, and threatened to invade unless Lochlann would submit to his judgment. Lochlann did so. As it transpired, Lochlann kept most of Galloway, and Donnchad was given the new "Mormaerdom" of Carrick in compensation.

More than any previous Lord of Galloway, he was the loyal man and vassal of the King of Scotland. After all, he owed his lands to the positive influence of King William. Whereas Lochlann's grandfather, Fergus had called himself King of Galloway, Lochlann's favourite title was "Constable of the King of Scots".

Lochlann had led William's armies north into Moireabh against the pretender Domnall mac Uilleim, who claimed the Scottish throne as a grandson of King Donnchad II of Scotland. Lochlann defeated him in 1187 at the Battle of Mam Garvia, a mysterious location probably near Dingwall.

Lochlann, unlike his uncle Gille Brigte, welcomed French and English colonisation into his eastern lands. In this, he was following his overlord, King William I of Scotland. Of all the Lords of Galloway, Lochlann is the least mentioned in the Gaelic annals, suggesting that he had lost touch somewhat with his background in the world of greater Irish Sea Gaeldom.

In 1200, he was in the company of King William in England, who was giving homage to the new king, John. Lochlann used the opportunity to make legal proceeding in Northampton regarding the property claims of his wife, Helena, daughter and heiress of Richard de Morville. It was here that he met his death and was buried. Lochlann and Helena had a son Alan, who succeeded to Galloway.

In 1191/1192, Lochlann founded Glenluce Abbey.

== Marriage and Children ==
At some time before 1185, possibly in the 1170s, Lochlann married Elena de Moreville, daughter and eventually sole heir of Richard de Morville, Lord of Cunninghame and Constable of Scotland. They had 5 children:

- Alan of Galloway oldest son, who succeeded to Galloway and as Constable of Scotland.
- Thomas of Galloway, married Isabella, Countess of Atholl.
- Dervorguilla of Galloway, married Nicholas de Stuteville, son of Nicholas I de Stuteville, Lord of Liddel.
- Ada of Galloway, married Walter Byset, Lord of Aboyne.
- a third son, name unknown, who died young.

Regnal titles
Preceded by Gille Brigte	Lords of Galloway	Succeeded by Alan
