= Gille Brigte of Galloway =

Scottish nobleman (died 1185)

Gille Brigte or Gilla Brigte mac Fergusa of Galloway (Galloway, 1126 - 1185), also known as Gillebrigte, Gille Brighde, Gilbridge, Gilbride, etc., and most famously known in French sources as Gilbert, was Lord of Galloway of Scotland (from 1161 with Uchtred; 1174 alone, to 1185). Gilla Brigte was one of two sons of the great Fergus, the builder of the "Kingdom" of Galloway.

== Background, marriage and family ==
In the struggle that arose after the death of Fergus between Gille Brigte and Uchtred, Gille Brigte emerged the stronger. The partitioning of Galloway left Gille Brigte with the western part, the part less exposed to the armies of the Scottish and English Kings.

We do not know for certain to whom Gille Brigte was married. Richard Oram suggests the strong likelihood that his main wife was a daughter of Donnchad II, Mormaer or Earl of Fife and the most important native lord in Scotland. The introduction of the name Donnchad (or Duncan) into the family naming pattern is some evidence of this, as is the later marriage of Gille Brigte's great-granddaughter Marjorie to the Fife petty-lord Adam de Kilconquhar.

Gille Brigte had two known children:

- Donnchad
- Máel Coluim

== Events of 1174 and approach to England ==
From 1161 until 1174, Gille Brigte and Uchtred shared the lordship, with Gille Brigte in the west, and Uchtred in the east. In 1174, King William le Lion of Scotland invaded England in an attempt to regain Northumberland. He brought with him the two meic Fergusa, Gille Brigte and Uchtred. During the invasion, William was caught off-guard, and captured while besieging the castle at Alnwick. Benedict of Peterborough reported that:

When they [the brothers] heard that their lord the king of Scotland was taken, they immediately returned with their Galwegians to their own lands, and at once expelled from Galloway all the bailiffs and guards whom the king of Scotland had set over them; and all the English and French whom they could seize they slew; and all the defences and castles which the king of Scotland had established in their land they besieged, captured and destroyed, and slew all whom they took within them

Despite the implications that both brothers were involved, it is clear that only Gilla Brigte was, and that Uchtred opposed him. For Benedict goes on to tell us that, in relation to the same year, Gille Brigte's son Máel Coluim was besieging Uchtred on an island in Galloway. Máel Coluim mac Gille Brigte captured Uchtred. Uchtred was blinded, castrated and had his tongue cut out.

What Gille Brigte did at this time might have changed British history for ever. Gille Brigte sent a messenger, and asked King Henry II for direct lordship (i.e. without the Scottish king as a middle man). Henry sent a delegation to investigate. This delegation consisted of Roger de Hoveden and Robert de Vaux. Thanks to the former, we have a record of the embassy. It is reported by Benedict of Peterborough that Gille Brigte offered the King of England a one-off payment of 2000 marks, and a yearly tribute of 500 cows and 500 swine, if the King would "remove them [the Galwegians] from the servitude of the king of Scotland" (Anderson, p. 258).

However, when the delegation discovered the fate of Uchtred, Henry's cousin, they rejected the request. Gille Brigte's fratricide effectively prevented any deal. Gille Brigte's bad fortune was compounded later in the year, when Henry and William signed the Treaty of Falaise. Gille Brigte was forced to come to terms with the two kings. In 1176, Gille Brigte travelled into England, was fined 1000 marks by Henry, and handed over his son Donnchad into Henry's custody as a hostage to ensure good behaviour.

== The Lordship of Gille Brigte ==
Gille Brigte's reign is characterized by a large degree of hostility towards the Scottish kings. Unlike his brother Uchtred, he was no friend to incoming Normans. He maintained a Gaelic following. Such a policy made him popular in the province, but alienated him from his nominal Franco-Gaelic overlords, King Máel Coluim IV and then King William. William cultivated the loyalty of Uchtred's son Lochlann (Roland), using him as a card in the game for control over the Galwegian lordship. In the 1180s, tension between Gille Brigte and William was high, with Gilla Brigte being known to have made frequent raids into the Scottish controlled territory of eastern Galloway. When Gille Brigte died in 1185, he was at war with William.

Gille Brigte's timely death, with Donnchad still in Henry II's custody, eased the way for William to install Lochlann as Gille Brigte's successor.

== Footnotes ==
| Preceded by Fergus | Lord of Galloway; 1161–1185; With: Uchtred 1161–1174 | Succeeded by Lochlann |
| Preceded by Fergus | Lord of Carrick; 1161–1185 | Succeeded by Donnchad |
