= Walter de Berkeley =

Scottish noble

Sir Walter de Berkley 8th of Gartly was a 13th-14th century Scottish noble.

Walter was the son of John de Berkley, 7th of Gartly. He was a supporter of Robert de Brus.

He did homage to King Edward I of England at Berwick on 28 August 1296. With John Comyn, Lord of Badenoch he held out against the invasion of Edward I until forced to surrender in February 1304. He again swore fealty and homage to King Edward I of England on 14 March 1304 at St Andrews. Walter was appointed Sheriff of Banff by Edward I in September 1305.

Walter played an important part in the northern campaign of 1307 with King Robert I of Scotland. He also witnessed the submission of William, Earl of Ross in 1308.

== Family ==
Walter is known to have had the following issue:

- Andrew de Berkley, 9th of Gartly
