= Fergus of Galloway =

Lord of Galloway (died 1161)

- Lord of Galloway
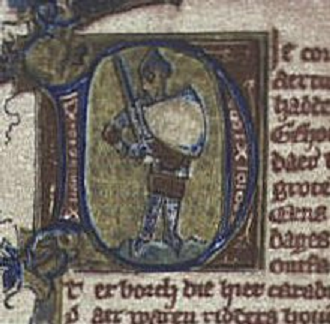
- Fourteenth-century illuminated initial of Leiden University Library Letterkunde 191 (Roman van Ferguut). The knight depicted in the initial may represent an Arthurian character who, in turn, may be named after Fergus himself.
- Died: 12 May 1161
- Spouse: Elizabeth Fitzroy (possibly)
- Issue: Affraic; Gilla Brigte; Uhtred

Fergus of Galloway (died 12 May 1161) was a twelfth-century Lord of Galloway. Although his familial origins are unknown, it is possible that he was of Norse–Gaelic ancestry. Fergus first appears on record in 1136, when he witnessed a charter of David I, King of Scotland. There is considerable evidence indicating that Fergus was married to an illegitimate daughter of Henry I, King of England. It is possible that Elizabeth Fitzroy was the mother of Fergus's three children.

Fergus forged a marital alliance with Óláfr Guðrøðarson, King of the Isles, through the marriage of the latter to Fergus's daughter, Affraic. As a consequence of this union, the leading branch of the Crovan dynasty descended from Fergus. When Óláfr was assassinated by a rival branch of the dynasty, Galloway itself was attacked before Fergus's grandson, Guðrøðr Óláfsson, was able to seize control of Isles. Both Fergus and his grandson appear to have overseen military operations in Ireland, before the latter was overthrown by Somairle mac Gilla Brigte, Lord of Argyll. The fact that there is no record of Fergus lending Guðrøðr support against Somairle could be evidence of a slackening of Fergus's authority. Contemporary sources certainly report that Galloway was wracked by inter-dynastic strife during the decade.

Fergus's fall from power came in 1160, after Malcolm IV, King of Scotland, settled a dispute amongst his leading magnates and launched three military campaigns into Galloway. The reasons for the Scottish invasion are unknown. On one hand, it is possible that Fergus had precipitated events by preying upon Scottish territories. In the aftermath of the attack, the king came to terms with Somairle which could be evidence that he had either been allied with Fergus against the Scots or that he had aided in Fergus's destruction. In any case, Fergus himself was driven from power, and forced to retire to the abbey of Holyrood. He died the next year. The Lordship of Galloway appears to have been partitioned between his sons, Gille Brigte and Uhtred, and Scottish influence further penetrated into Galloway.

== Origins ==
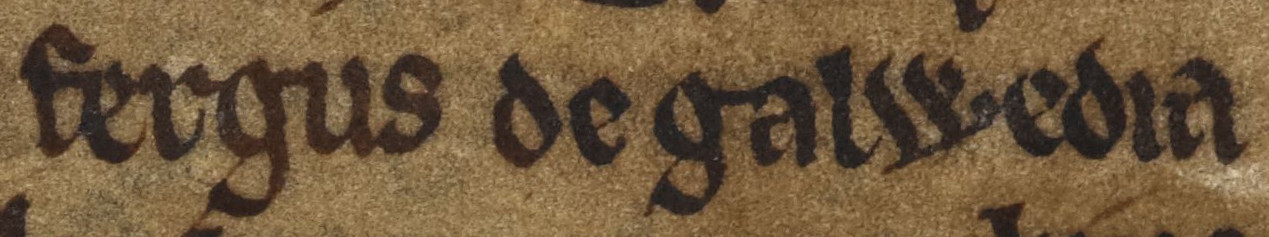
Fergus's name as it appears on folio 35v of British Library Cotton Julius A VII (the Chronicle of Mann): "Fergus de Galwedia"

Fergus's familial origins are unknown. He is not accorded a patronym in contemporary sources, and his later descendants are traced no further than him in their charters. (Note: The only known examples of surnames borne by members of Fergus's family in the Irish Annals are the following attributed to (Fergus's grandson) Roland fitz Uhtred, Lord of Galloway and his sons: "Ailín mac Uchtraigh", "Rolant mac Uchtraich", "Rollant mac Uchtraigh", "Tomas mac Uchtraigh", "Tomas mac Uchtraigh", "Tomás mac Uchtraigh", "Tomas mac Uchtraigh", "Tomass mac Uchtraigh", and "Tomáss macc Uchtraidh".) The fact that he tends to be styled "of Galloway" in contemporary sources suggests that he was the head of the most important family in the region. Such appears to have been the case with Fergus's contemporary Freskin, a significant settler in Moray, who was styled de Moravia.

One source that may possibly cast light on Fergus's familial origins is Roman de Fergus, a mediaeval Arthurian romance, mainly set in southern Scotland, which tells the tale of a knight who may represent Fergus himself. The name of the knight's father in this source is a form of the name borne by Fergus's neighbouring contemporary Somairle mac Gilla Brigte, Lord of Argyll, and could be evidence that Fergus's father bore the same name. (Note: Conversely, the name of the knight's father could indicate that this character represents the historical Somairle himself. Evidence that Somairle and Fergus were indeed related could be the fact that Gilla Brigte, who may have been Fergus's eldest son, bore the same name as Somairle's father, Gilla Brigte.) On the other hand, instead of being evidence of any historical relationship, the names could have been employed by the romance merely because they were regarded as stereotypically Gallovidian. In any case, there is reason to suspect that the romance is a literary pastiche or parody of the compositions of Chrétien de Troyes; and besides the coincidence of names, the tale has little to commend it as an authoritative source for the historical Fergus.

Despite the uncertainty surrounding his origins, it is possible that Fergus was of Norse–Gaelic and native Gallovidian ancestry. Traditionally, the Gallovidians appear to have looked towards the Isles instead of Scotland, and the core of his family's lands seems to have centred in valley of the river Dee and the coastal area around Whithorn, regions of substantial Scandinavian settlement. In any case, the fact that Fergus died as an old man in 1161 suggests that he was born before 1100.

== Early career ==
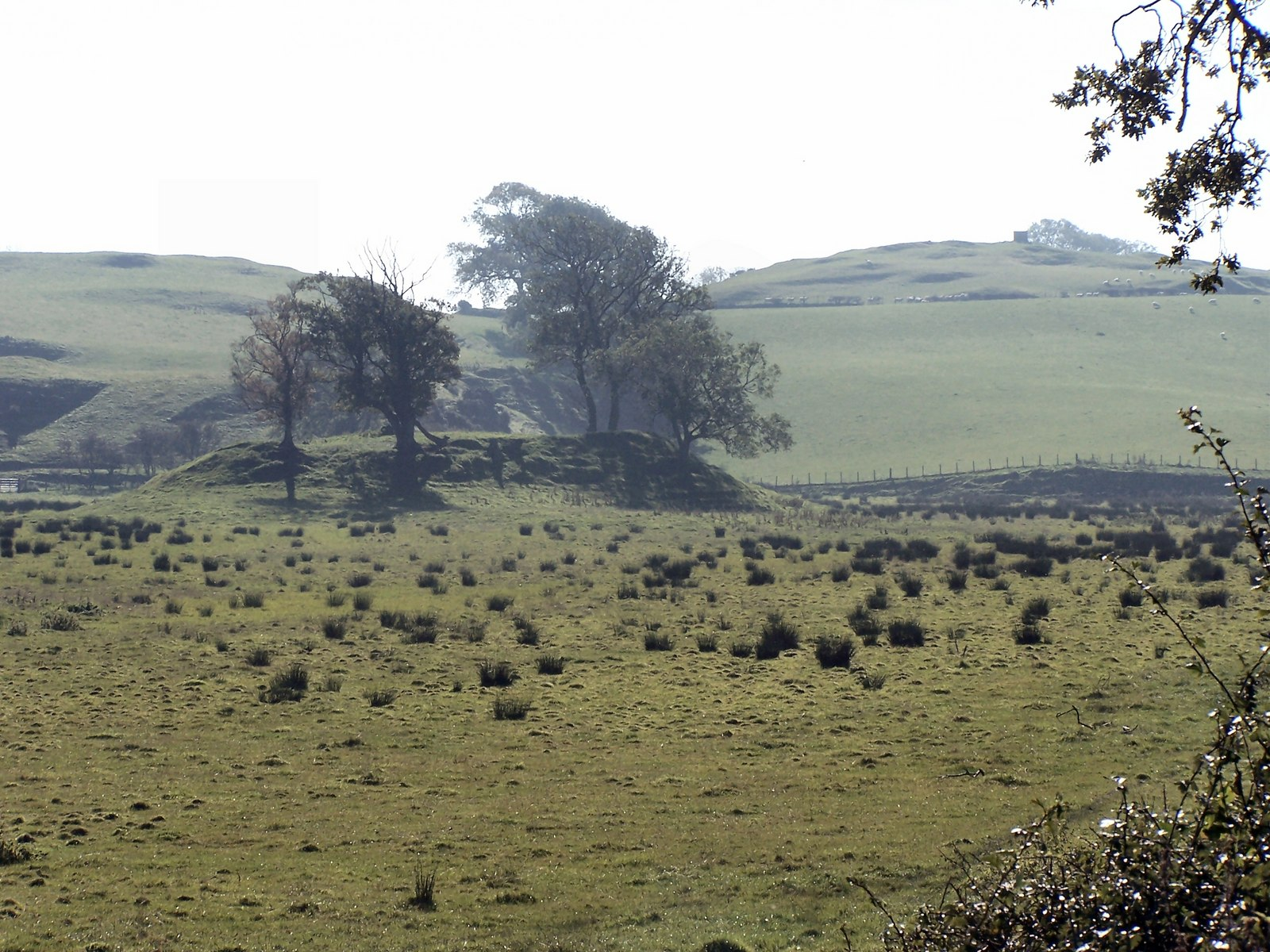
One of the mounds in Lochfergus, a now-drained lochan near Kirkcudbright, where Fergus may have had a fortress

Fergus first appears on record in about 1136×1141, when he and his son, Uhtred, witnessed the grant of the lands of Partick to the church of St Kentigern at Glasgow. (Note: At about the same time, Fergus also witnessed a grant of David to the church of St Kentigern in Glasgow concerning the king's gift of revenue from Strathgryfe, Cunningham, Kyle, and Carrick. Another grant witnessed by Fergus at about this date concerned David's grant of a cut of the profits from Cumberland to the church. Both of these acts were concluded at Cadzow. The three transactions are the only Scottish royal acts witnessed by Fergus. Although Fergus is generally styled Lord of Galloway in modern historiography, there is no evidence that Fergus himself bore such a title. Surviving sources typically fail to accord him any title whatsoever, although there a few that may allude to royal status. For example, a late mediaeval list of endowments to the Knights Hospitaller accords him the royal title "rex Galwitensium", a style unlikely to have been invented by the clerk. Vita Ailredi describes Fergus as a regulus, a title which can either represent a diminutive form of rex ("king"), or simply refer to a ruler without any royal connotations. The twelfth- to thirteenth-century Chronicle of Holyrood calls Fergus princeps Galwaie, a style that likewise does not necessarily refer to royalty. Nevertheless, this source styles both Óengus, Earl of Moray and Donnchad I, Earl of Fife as comites, which seems to be indicate that Fergus was regarded to be of a higher status to these men.) The exact extent of the twelfth-century Lordship of Galloway is unclear. Surviving acta of Fergus and Uhtred reveal a concentration of endowments in central Galloway, between the rivers Urr and Fleet. Subsequent grants of lands by later descendants of Fergus in the Dee valley could represent the expansion of territory from this original core. There is evidence indicating that Fergus's domain extended into western Galloway as well. His descendants were certainly associated with the castle of Cruggleton and dealt with lands in the vicinity.

In 1140, during the return journey of Máel Máedoc Ua Morgair, Archbishop of Armagh from Clairvaux to Ulster, the latter made landfall at Cruggleton, as evidenced by Vita Sancti Malachiae, composed by Bernard of Clairvaux. Although this source associates the castle with the Scots, it seems unlikely that Scottish royal authority extended to the Gallovidian coast, and the statement could therefore be a result of confusion with Máel Máedoc's previous stay at the castle of Carlisle, then controlled by David I, King of Scotland. In fact, Máel Máedoc's visit to Cruggleton may have involved the local lord of the region, conceivably Fergus himself. The mid-twelfth-century lordship, therefore, seems to have been centred in the region of Wigtown Bay and the mouth of the river Dee.

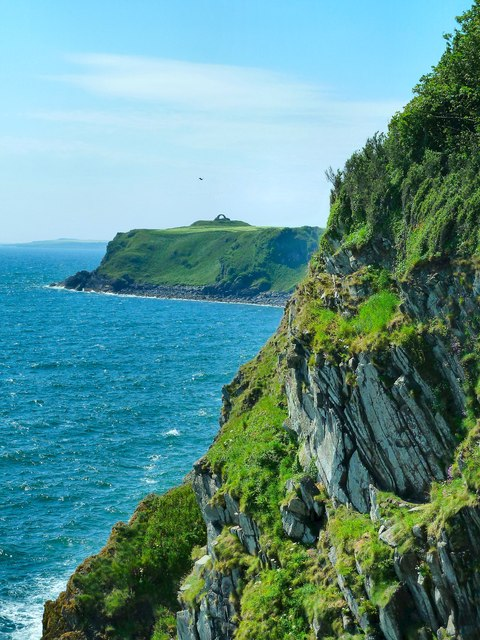
The ruinous castle of Cruggleton from a distance. This fortress was an ancient Gallovidian power centre, and the castle itself may have been built by Fergus's grandson, Roland fitz Uhtred.

The fact that Gilla Brigte, who may well have been Fergus's eldest child, later appears to have drawn his power from west of the river Cree could be evidence that this man's mother was a member of a prominent family from this region. Such an alliance could also explain Fergus's apparent westward expansion. Whatever the case, the fact that the Diocese of Whithorn was revived in about 1128, possibly at the hands of Fergus himself, could indicate that he purposely established an episcopal see that encompassed the entirety of his domain. The apparent extension of Fergus's authority into western Galloway may have been facilitated by the disintegration of the expansive nearby Kingdom of the Isles. Upon the death of the reigning Guðrøðr Crovan, King of the Isles, the Isles plunged into chaos, enduring periods of vicious dynastic kin-strife, overwhelming Norwegian overlordship, and Irish intrusion as well. By the end of the first quarter of the twelfth century, however, Guðrøðr Crovan's youngest son, Óláfr, seems to have been reinserted into the Isles by Henry I, King of England. This restoration of the Crovan dynasty appears to have formed part of the English Crown's extension of influence into the Irish Sea region. Another aspect of this expansion was the establishment of David, a younger brother of the reigning Alexander I, King of Scotland, as Henry I's vassal.

== Allied to the English ==
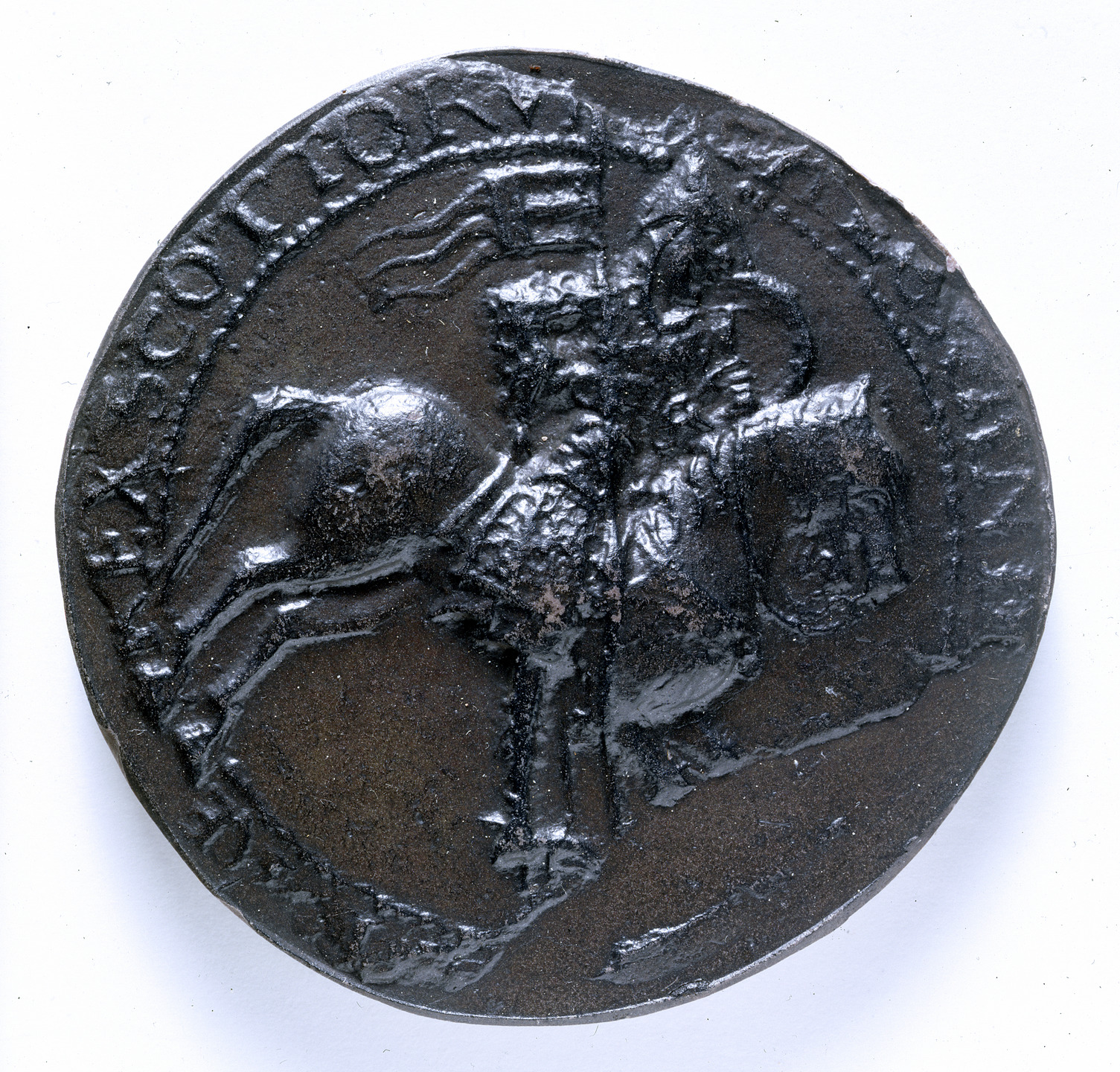
Seal of Alexander I, King of Scotland, apparent brother-in-law of Fergus

There is considerable evidence indicating that Fergus married a daughter of Henry I (many believe it was Elizabeth Fitzroy). For example, there is documentary evidence suggesting that all three of Fergus's children—Uhtred, Gilla Brigte, and Affraic—were related to the English royal family. Specifically, Uhtred was called a cousin of Henry I's grandson, Henry II, King of England, by Roger de Hoveden. Although sources specifically concerning Gilla Brigte fail to make a similar claim, potentially indicating that he had a different mother than Uhtred, Gilla Brigte's son, Donnchad, Earl of Carrick, was certainly regarded as a kinsman of Henry II's son and successor, John, King of England. In regard to Affraic, Robert de Torigni, Abbot of Mont Saint-Michel remarked that her son, Guðrøðr Óláfsson, King of Dublin and the Isles, was related to Henry II through the latter's mother, Matilda, one of Henry I's daughters.

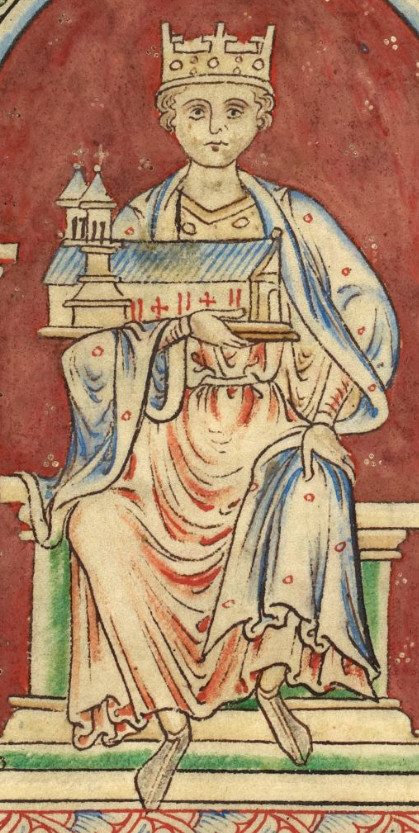
Henry I, King of England as depicted in British Library Royal 14 C VII

Henry I appears to have had about twenty-four illegitimate children. Although the name and identity of Fergus's wife is unknown, she would seem to have been one of Henry I's numerous illegitimate daughters through which the king forged marital alliances with neighbouring princes along the periphery of his Anglo-Norman realm. The date of Uhtred's earliest attestation suggests that he was born in about 1123/1124 at the latest, whilst the fact that Guðrøðr was old enough to render homage to the Norwegian king in 1153 suggests that Affraic herself was born no later than about 1122. Such birth dates suggest that Fergus's marriage dates to a period when the English Crown consolidated authority in the north-west and extended its influence into the Irish Sea. From the perspective of the English, an alliance between Henry I and Fergus would have secured an understanding with the man who controlled an important part of the north western flank of the Anglo-Norman realm. In fact, one of Henry I's bastard daughters, Sybilla, was wed to the reigning Alexander, seemingly not long after the latter's accession. Fergus's own apparent marriage, therefore, appears to evidence not only his pre-eminent status in Galloway itself, but the degree of political sovereignty he possessed as its ruler. The unions of Alexander and Fergus evidence Henry I's intent of extending English authority north of the Solway Firth.

== David and Scottish consolidation ==
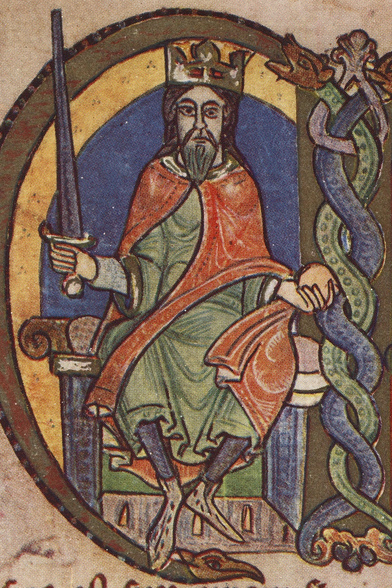
David I, King of Scotland as he is depicted in a mid-twelfth-century royal charter

The early twelfth century saw the rise of Alexander's younger brother, David. The latter's close connections with the English likely contributed to his eventual acquisition of a substantial part of southern Scotland from Alexander. In about 1113, David married Maud de Senlis, a wealthy English widow, and through her came into possession of extensive lordship that came to be known as the Honour of Huntingdon. As the mid-part of the century approached, the balance of power along the northern part of the Anglo-Norman realm began to shift in favour of David. (Note: David's latter's extension of authority into the Southern Uplands, in a specific region perhaps stretching from Strathgryffe to Carrick, appears to be evidenced by a later grant of his succeeding grandson, Malcolm IV, King of Scotland, which mentions unspecified Gall Gaidhel lands held by David during Alexander's reign.) In 1120, Henry I's only legitimate son died along with Richard d'Avranches, Earl of Chester in the White Ship disaster. The latter's lordship in the Welsh March was a critical region of Henry I's realm, and the English king responded by transplanting Ranulf le Meschin from his lordship of Carlisle to Richard d'Avranches's former lordship along the Welsh frontier.

Upon Alexander's death in 1124, David succeeded to the throne. The latter's subsequent endowment of Annandale to Robert de Brus appears to have not only signalled the Scottish Crown's intention of consolidating control of the region, but served as a declaration of the kingdom's claims to Cumbria. Fergus's marriage to Henry I's daughter, which appears to date to about this period, may have been arranged with such developments in mind. If so, the union could have been orchestrated as a means to not only compensate for Ranulf's removal, but to counter the dramatic rise of David and the resultant imbalance of power his ascent created. With Ranulf thus vacated from the north, Henry I had filled the power vacuum with various so-called "new men". One such incomer may have been Robert de Brus, a Norman who had previously received extensive lands from the English Crown. In fact, it is possible that it was in the wake of Ranulf's removal that Robert de Brus originally received the lordship of Annandale. If so, the latter may have been inserted into the region by Henry I, or perhaps through collaborative effort between Henry I and his then-vassal David as a means of securing the Anglo-Scottish border. (Note: Another possibility is that Robert de Brus had been originally installed in Annandale by Ranulf himself.) The apparent rise of Fergus at about this time may have also played a part in the infeftment of Annandale.

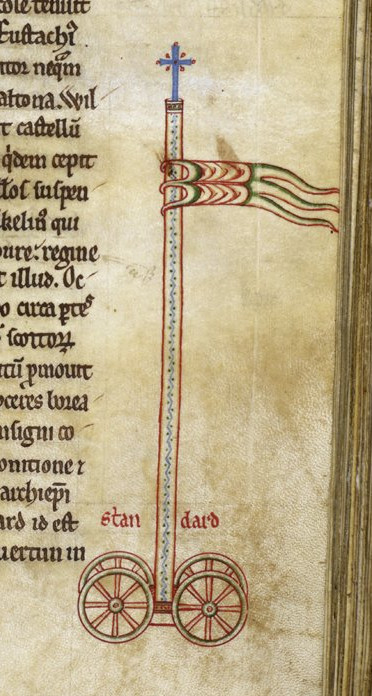
Marginal illustration in British Library Royal 14 C II (Chronica) of the standard after which the Battle of the Standard is named

Henry I himself was married to David's older sister, Edith, a union which closely bound him to the Scottish royal house. For as long as Henry I lived, relations between him and David remained harmonious. When the former died in 1135, however, the peace between the neighbouring realms was shattered when his nephew, Stephen of Blois, Count of Boulogne and Mortain, successfully seized the throne. Before the end of the year, the Scots surged forth and seized Carlisle and Cumberland before peace was restored. Relations broke down the following year, and the Scots again invaded in 1137, seizing Northumberland, and pushed forth towards York. The contemporary accounts of the English chroniclers Richard Hexham and Ailred, Abbot of Rievaulx single out Gallovidian soldiers for their excessive atrocities in David's campaign. Disaster struck the Scots in 1138 at the Battle of the Standard, when David's forces were utterly overcome by the English near Northallerton.

Although Gallovidians clearly took part in David's campaigning, there is no specific evidence connecting Fergus to the operations until after operations ceased. It is possible that Fergus's attestation of 1136 could have had bearing on Gallovidian participation in the king's campaigning. If Fergus's wife was indeed a bastard of Henry I, Fergus himself had a stake in the unfolding English succession crisis, as she would have been a half-sister of Stephen's opponent, Matilda, whom Henry I had nominated as his royal successor. Explicit confirmation of Fergus's involvement may exist in the terms of the subsequent peace treaty, as Richard Hexham recorded that one of the hostages that was handed over to the English for surety was the son of an earl named Fergus. The fact that there was no Scottish earl of that name suggests that, unless Richard Hexham was mistaken, it was Fergus himself who was referred to. In any case, after this date there is no further evidence of Fergus's involvement in Anglo-Scottish affairs.

== Ecclesiastical activities ==
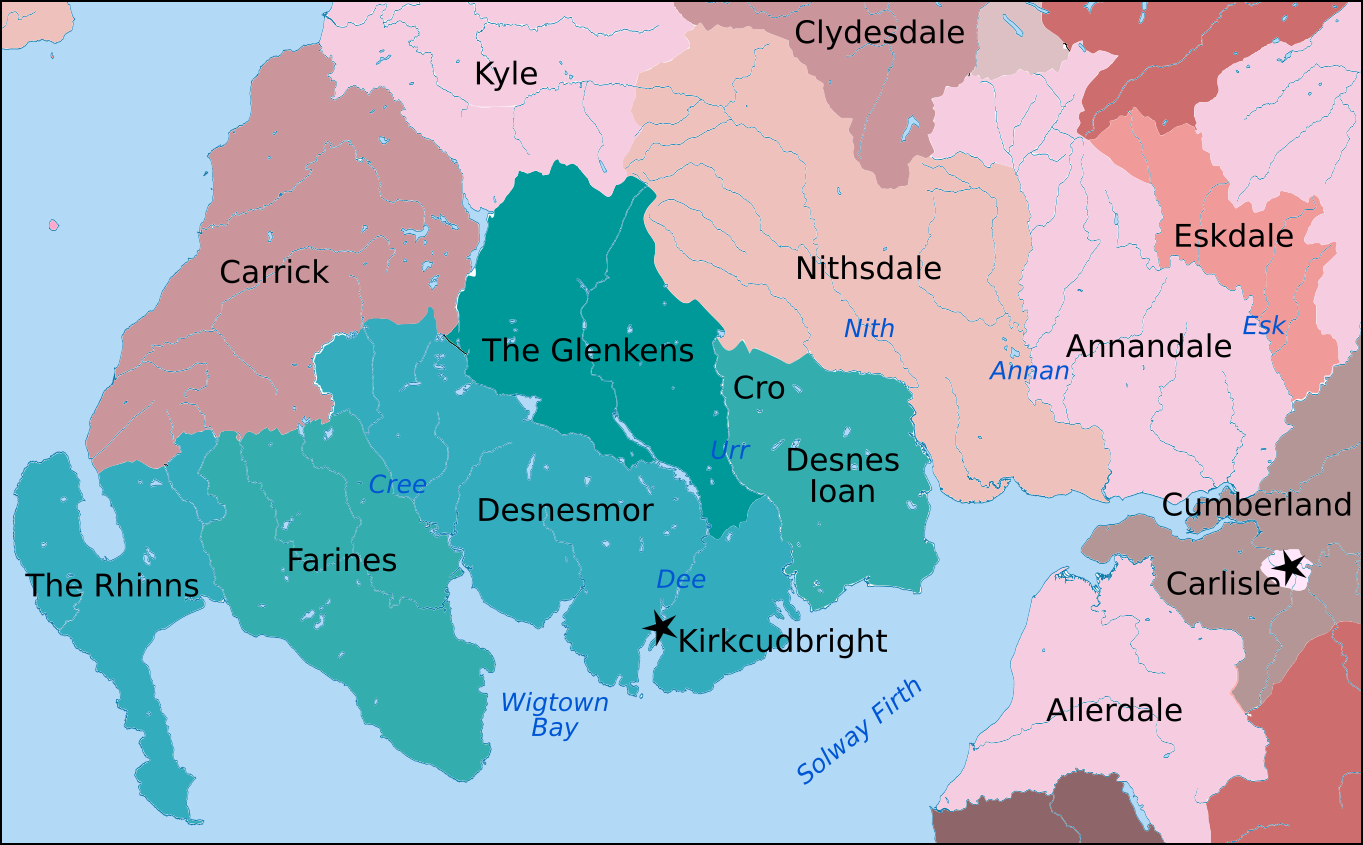
Divisions within the Lordship of Galloway (coloured green) and surrounding lordships in the twelfth century. (Note: The Gallovidian regions are the Rhinns, Farines, the Glenkens, Desnesmor, and Desnes Ioan.) The Diocese of Whithorn encompassed all Gallovidan regions except Desnes Ioan, which fell under the Scottish Diocese of Glasgow, and appears to have been only incorporated into the lordship during the tenure of Fergus's sons.

In about 1128, the Diocese of Whithorn was revived after three centuries had passed since the consecration of the last diocesan bishop. The revival itself is revealed by a papal mandate dated December 1128, and the record of the oath of the bishop-elect, Gilla Aldan, to Thurstan, Archbishop of York between about 1128 and 1140. It is uncertain who was the driving force behind the revival. David's known ecclesiastical activities could suggest that he was responsible. On the other hand, the extent of David's authority in Galloway is questionable. As for Fergus himself, there is no conclusive proof that he controlled the lordship at this point in time, or that he himself established the see.

The fact that Gilla Aldan was likely of native origin—as opposed to David's apparent preference for Anglo-Norman clergy—and the fact that Gilla Aldan professed obedience to the Archbishop of York—an ecclesiast whom David was attempting to exclude from influencing the Scottish Church—would both appear to indicate Gilla Aldan was a non-Scottish appointment. If Fergus was indeed responsible for Whithorn's revival, it would have almost certainly aided his royal aspirations since securing ecclesiastical independence could have been part of the process of ensuring political independence. Gilla Aldan's successor was Christian, a man who was consecrated in 1154 by Hugh d'Amiens, Archbishop of Rouen, who in turn may have been acting as a proxy for Roger de Pont l'Evêque, Archbishop-elect of York.

Fergus and his family were remarkable ecclesiastical patrons, working with Augustinians, Benedictines, Cistercians, and Premonstratensians. Surviving charter evidence reveals that Fergus granted the lands of Dunrod, St Mary's Isle (upon which a priory was at some point erected), and nearby Galtway to the Augustinian abbey of Holyrood. A fifteenth-century list of properties belonging to the Knights Hospitaller reveals that Fergus had granted this order of the lands of Galtway (within the mediaeval parishes of Balmaclellan and Dalry) at some point in his career. This transaction appears to further evidence Fergus's alignment with the English Crown.

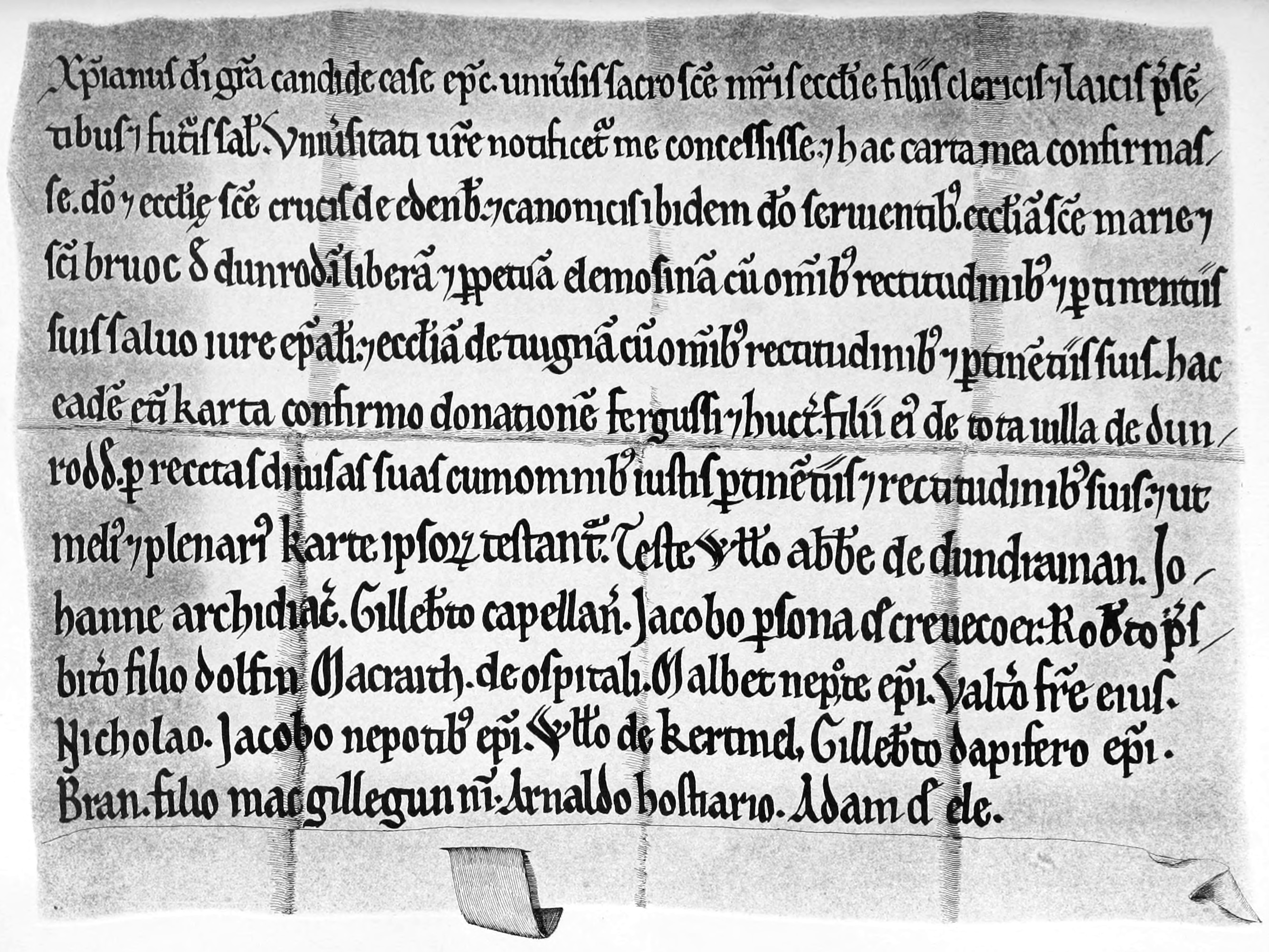
Confirmation charter noting Fergus's grant of lands of Dunrod to the Scottish abbey of Holyrood. Fergus's name appears on the sixth line.

The necrology of the abbey of Newhouse states that Fergus was the founder of a Premonstratensian house at Whithorn. Both he and Christian are stated by the necrology of the abbey of Prémontré to have founded a monastery at Whithorn. Christian's tenure as bishop (1154–1186), and Fergus's reign as lord (×1160), suggest that the priory of Whithorn was founded at some point between about 1154 and 1160. According to the annals of Maurice of Prato, this house was transformed into a Premonstratensian house by Christian in about 1177. These sources, therefore, appear to reveal that Fergus was responsible for the establishment of a possibly Augustinian house at Whithorn, whilst Christian was responsible for its later refoundation as a Premonstratensian institution. Such a switch was not an unknown occurrence in England or on the Continent.

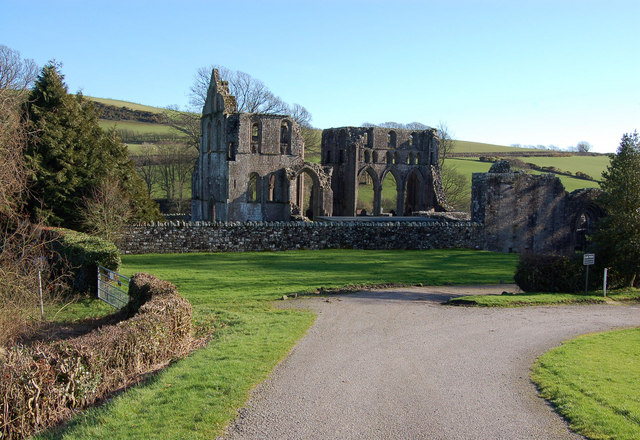
The ruinous remains of the Cistercian abbey of Dundrennan, perhaps founded or co-founded by Fergus. It is possible that monastery was founded partly as an act of penitence for Gallovidian atrocities committed in 1138 during the Scottish Crown's invasion of northern England.

Either Fergus or David—or perhaps both Fergus and David—may have been responsible for the foundation of the abbey of Dundrennan, a Cistercian house situated well within the confines of Fergus's lordship. John Fordun and Walter Bower accord its foundation solely to David, although the near contemporary John Hexham failed to note the house amongst David's known foundations. The fact that Walter Daniel, a Cistercian monk from the community at Rievaulx, was highly critical of Galloway and its inhabitants may be evidence that Fergus was unlikely to have been the sole founder. David's own close connections with the Cistercians could suggest that the monastery owed its formation, as a daughter house of Rievaulx, to cooperation between David and Fergus.

The abbey of Dundrennan appears to have been founded in about 1142, which in turn places its formation at a time when David had extended his power in the south west. Such a date also places the foundation at about the time Máel Máedoc was in the region, which in turn may hint at his own involvement. In any case, if Fergus and David were involved in the abbey's endowment, the fact that it was colonised by Cistercians from Rievaulx suggests that it was somewhat of a penitential foundation in regard to the infamous Gallovidian contribution at the Battle of the Standard four years previously. Furthermore, the fact that Thurstan himself had been responsible for the English resistance meant that Fergus had warred against his own spiritual overlord, and had almost certainly endured ecclesiastical repercussions as a result. In the eyes of the Cistercians, Fergus and David were both responsible for failing to curb atrocities committed during the campaign, and Fergus himself was held accountable by Walter Daniel's Vita Ailredi for thousands of deaths.

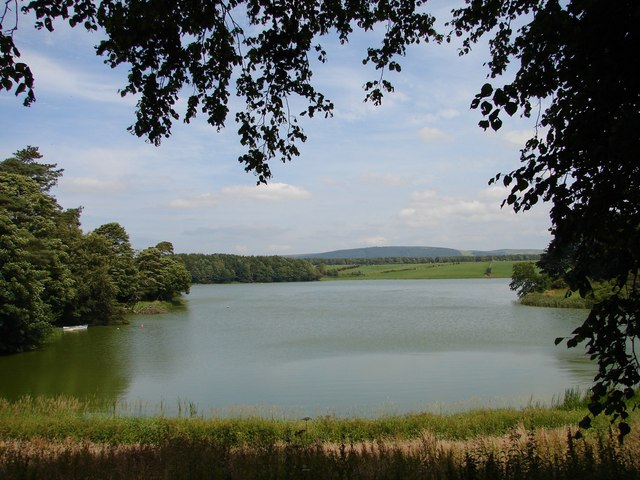
Soulseat Loch, sometimes called the Green Lake, where the abbey of Soulseat once stood. The abbey could be identical to "Viride Stagnum" ("green lake"), where Máel Máedoc founded a monastery.

Another religious house possibly founded by Fergus was the abbey of Soulseat, a Premonstratensian house seated near Stranraer. Walter Bower and the necrologies certainly state as such. However, the fact that this house appears to be identical to the "Viride Stagnum" attested by the contemporary Vita Sancti Malachiae seems to be evidence that Soulseat originated as a Cistercian house founded by Máel Máedoc himself. If Máel Máedoc and Fergus met during the former's apparent stay in Cruggleton, it is conceivable that Fergus granted him the lands upon which he founded a religious house at Soulseat. If Máel Máedoc indeed founded a Cistercian house on this site, it clearly was converted to a Premonstratensian monastery not long afterwards, under the advocacy of Fergus. The church of Cruggleton, near the site of the like-named castle, could have also been constructed by Fergus.

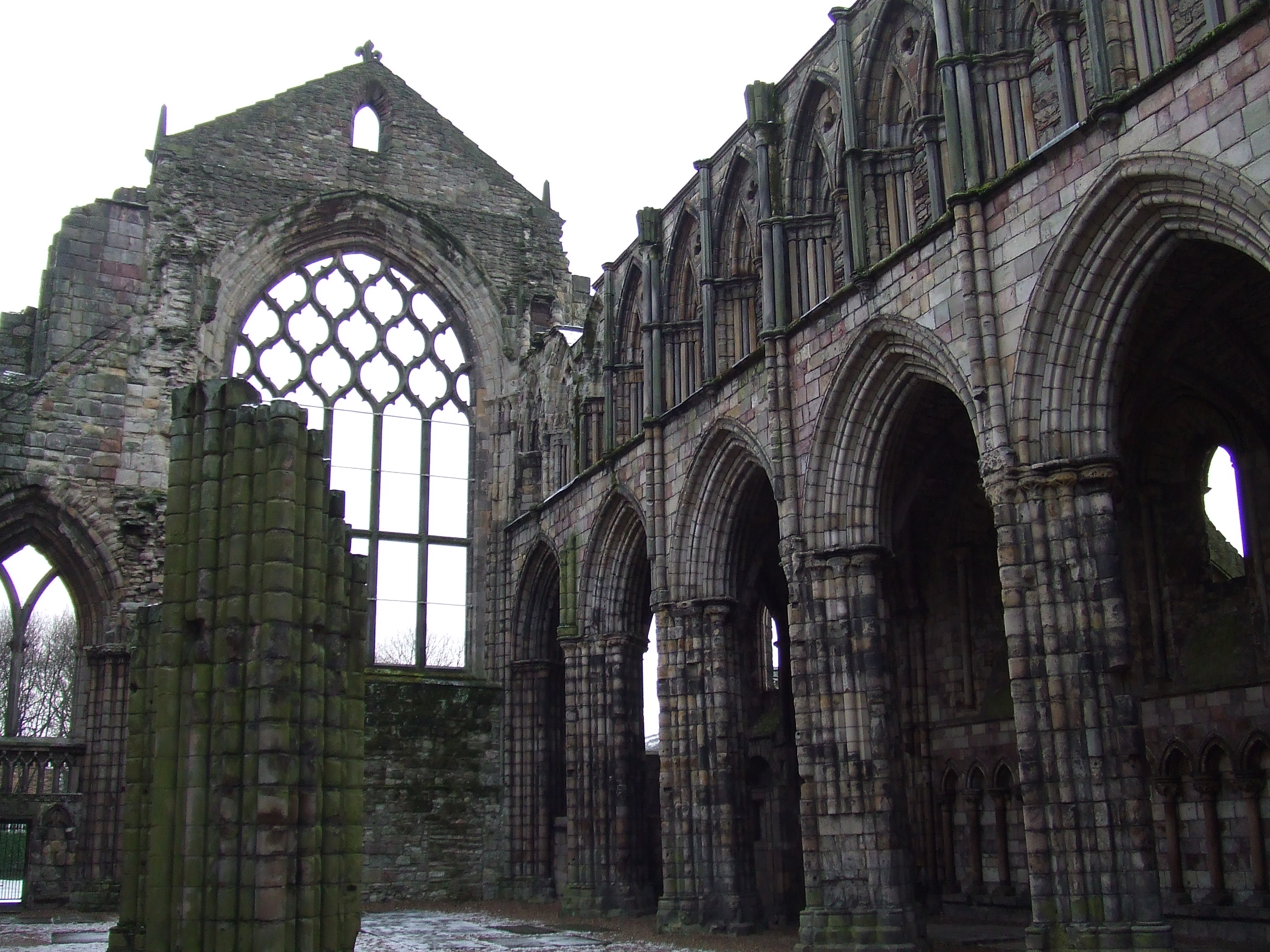
The ruinous remains of the Augustinian abbey of Holyrood, where Fergus retired in 1160

Although the late mediaeval Hystoria Fundacionis Prioratus Insule de Traile claims that Fergus founded the priory of St Mary's Isle, the fantastical foundation claims preserved by this source are not corroborated by contemporary sources. According to a confirmation charter dating to within the decade after Fergus's death, Fergus granted the house to the abbey of Holyrood. A confirmation charter of William I, King of Scotland reveals that the priory of St Mary's Isle may have been in existence by the time of Fergus's grandson, Roland fitz Uhtred, Lord of Galloway, although the first recorded prior appears in the thirteenth century. Fergus's supposed links with this house, therefore, are dubious. Although Walter Bower declared that Fergus was responsible for the foundation of the abbey of Tongland, his great-grandson, Alan fitz Roland, Lord of Galloway, appears to have founded it in the thirteenth century. The erroneous attribution of Fergus to this house may be the result of an attempt to enhance the antiquity of its establishment by linking it with the progenitor of Alan's family.

It is a wild country [Galloway] where the inhabitants are like beasts, and altogether barbarous. ... Rievaulx made a foundation in this savagery, which now, by the help of God, who gives the increase to a new plantation, bears much fruit.

— excerpt from Vita Ailredi depicting the perceived contrast between the Gallovdian culture and the reformed religious foundations introduced by Fergus.

The inspiration behind Fergus's ecclesiastical patronage is uncertain. On one hand, it is conceivable that he was imitating or competing with the extensive patronage of the Scottish monarchy. On the other hand, familial connections with the rulers of England and the Isles could have played a part in his ecclesiastical interests. Contact with influential ecclesiasts like Máel Máedoc and Ailred could have also inspired Fergus's benefactions. (Note: Considering Fergus's apparent connections with Cistercians, Augustinians, and Premonstratensians, a possible relationship between him and Máel Máedoc is not inconceivable. Fergus may have also possessed connections with Ailred, who spent part of his career as a member of David's court before becoming Abbot of Rievaulx. According to Vita Ailredi, it was Ailred who later reconciled Fergus with his sons, and further prevailed upon him to retire from the lordship to the abbey of Holyrood.)

Furthermore, the introduction of Augustinians and Premonstratensians into Galloway may have been part of a process of revitalising the newly reformed diocese. The construction of ecclesiastical buildings, much like castles, was often a means by which mediaeval rulers displayed their pre-eminent status, which in turn could explain Fergus's ecclesiastical activities. In effect, his religious foundations may evince attempts to assert his authority in the region. While the foundation of an episcopal see seems to have been a means by which Fergus sought to reinforce his independence from the Scots, his remarkable support of reformed religious orders may have been a way in which he attempted to legitimise his regal aspirations.

== Unravelling of the Isles ==
=== Alliance with Óláfr Guðrøðarson ===
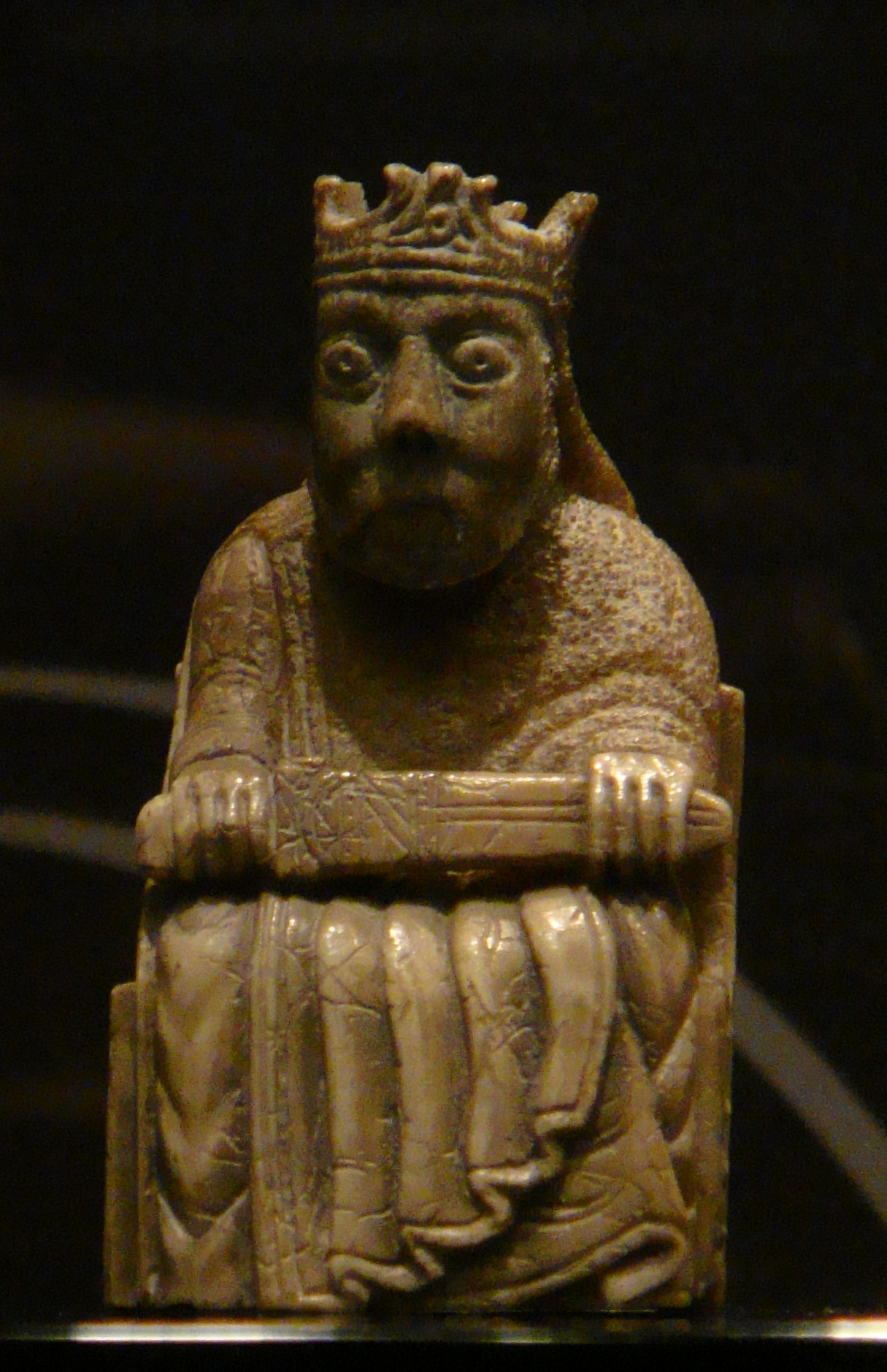
A king gaming piece of the so-called Lewis chessmen. Some of the pieces may have arrived in the Isles as a result of Guðrøðr's dealings in Norway.

Early in his career, Fergus bound himself to the Isles in the form of a marital alliance between Affraic and Óláfr, the reigning King of the Isles. Although the union itself is not dated in contemporary sources, the Scandinavian sojourn undertaken the couple's son in 1152 suggests that the marriage was arranged in the 1130s or 1140s. The alliance forged between Óláfr and Fergus gave the former's family valuable familial-connections with the English Crown, one of the most powerful monarchies in western Europe. As for Fergus, the union bound Galloway more tightly to a neighbouring kingdom from which an invasion had been launched during the overlordship of Magnús Óláfsson, King of Norway. The alliance with Óláfr also ensured Fergus the protection of one of Britain's most formidable fleets, and further gave him a valuable ally outwith the orbit of the Scottish Crown.

One possible reason for Fergus's apparent lack of further participation in Anglo-Scottish affairs may have been due to events in the Isles. Although the thirteenth- to fourteenth-century Chronicle of Mann portrays Óláfr's reign as one of tranquillity, a more accurate evaluation of his reign may be that he adeptly managed to navigate an uncertain political climate. In regard to Fergus, the acquisition of the Dublin kingship in 1142, by the Islesman Ottar mac meic Ottair, may well have represented a threat to the authority of Óláfr, and the prospects of Fergus's grandson. By the mid-part of the twelfth century, however, the ageing Óláfr's realm may well have begun to buckle under the strain, as perhaps evidenced by the depredations wrought on the Scottish mainland by Óláfr's leading ecclesiast, Wimund, Bishop of the Isles. Confirmation of Óláfr's concern over the royal succession may well be preserved by the chronicle, which states that Guðrøðr journeyed to the court of Ingi Haraldsson, King of Norway in 1152, where Guðrøðr rendered homage to the Norwegian king, and seemingly secured recognition of the royal inheritance of the Isles.

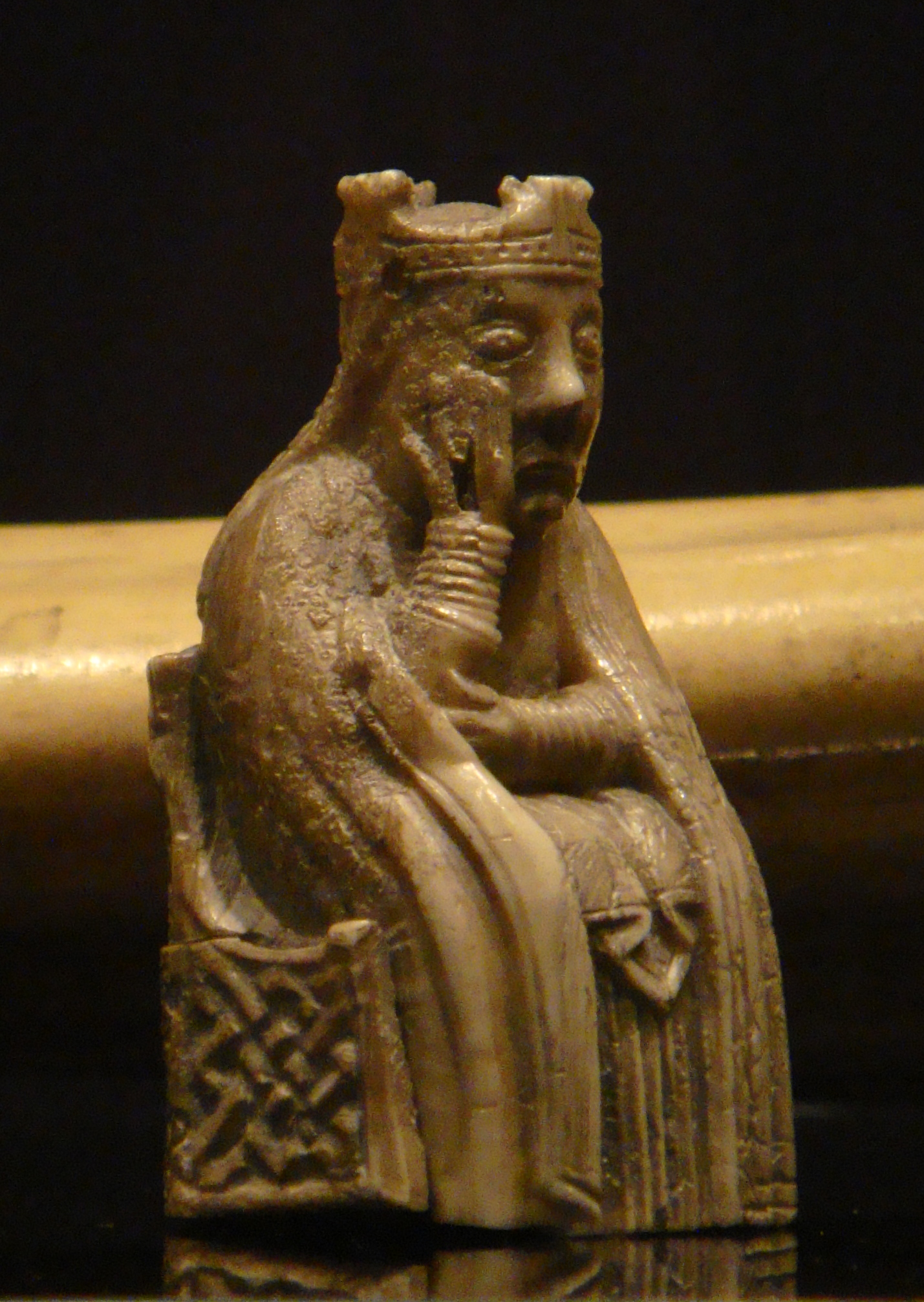
A queen gaming piece of the so-called Lewis chessmen Almost nothing is known of queenship in the Isles.

The following year marked a watershed in the history for the Kingdom of the Isles with the successive deaths of David and Óláfr. The latter was slain by three Dublin-based sons of his exiled brother, after which these men—the Haraldsonnar—partitioned Mann amongst themselves. Once in control, the chronicle reveals that the Haraldsonnar fortified themselves against forces loyal to the kingdom's legitimate heir by launching a pre-emptive strike against Fergus. Although the invasion of Galloway was repulsed with heavy casualties, once the Haraldsonnar returned to Mann the chronicle records that they slaughtered and expelled all resident Gallovidians that they could find. This ruthless reaction evidently reveals an attempt to uproot local factions adhering to Affraic and her son. Whatever the case, within months of his father's assassination, Guðrøðr executed his vengeance. Enstrengthened with Norwegian military support, Guðrøðr overcame his three kin-slaying cousins, and successfully secured the kingship for himself.

=== Rise of Somairle mac Gilla Brigte ===
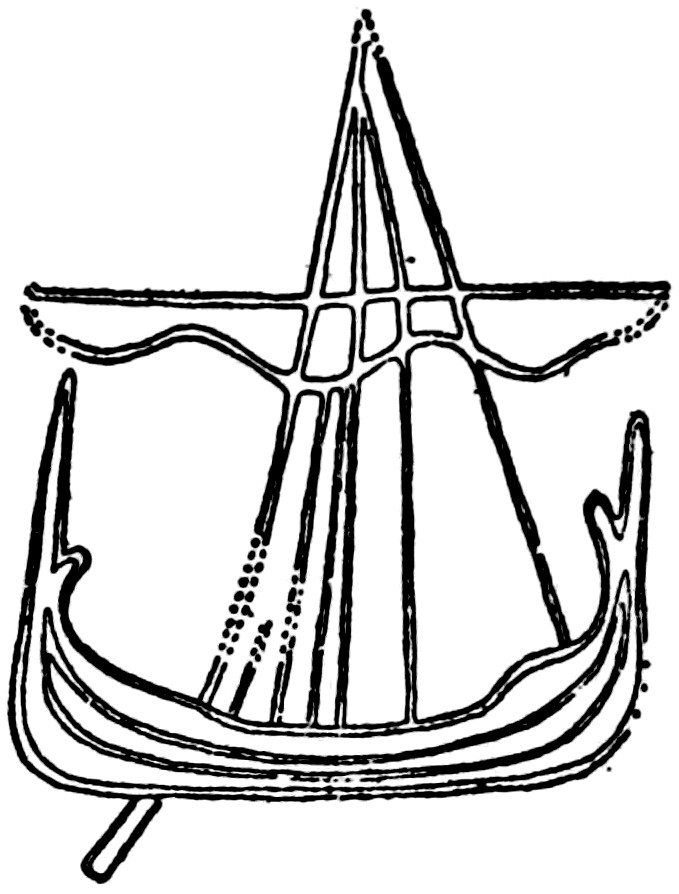
Detail from Maughold IV, a Manx runestone displaying a contemporary sailing vessel. The power of the kings of the Isles laid in their armed galley-fleets.

Midway through the twelfth-century, Muirchertach Mac Lochlainn, King of Tír nEógain pressed forth his claim to the high-kingship of Ireland, an office then held by the elderly Toirrdelbach Ua Conchobair, King of Connacht. In 1154, the forces of Toirrdelbach and Muirchertach met in a major maritime conflict off the Inishowen coast. According to the seventeenth-century Annals of the Four Masters, Muirchertach's maritime forces were mercenaries drawn from Galloway, Arran, Kintyre, Mann, and "the territories of Scotland". This record appears to be evidence that Guðrøðr, Fergus, and perhaps Somairle, provided ships to Muirchertach's cause. (Note: An alternate possibility is that the annal does not refer to Galloway at all, and that it actually refers to the Gall Gaidheil of Arran, Kintyre, Mann, and the territory of Scotland.) Although Toirrdelbach's forces obtained a narrow victory, his northern maritime power seems to have been virtually nullified by the severity of the contest, and Muirchertach soon after marched on Dublin, gained overlordship over the Dubliners, and effectively secured himself the high-kingship of Ireland for himself.

The defeat of forces drawn from the Isles, and Muirchertach's subsequent spread of power into Dublin, may have had severe repercussions concerning Guðrøðr's career. In 1155 or 1156, Somairle and an apparent relative of Ottar precipitated a coup against Guðrøðr, presenting Somairle's son, Dubgall, as a replacement to Guðrøðr's rule. Late in 1156, Somairle and Guðrøðr clashed and divided the Kingdom of the Isles between themselves. Two years later the former drove the latter from the kingship and into exile.

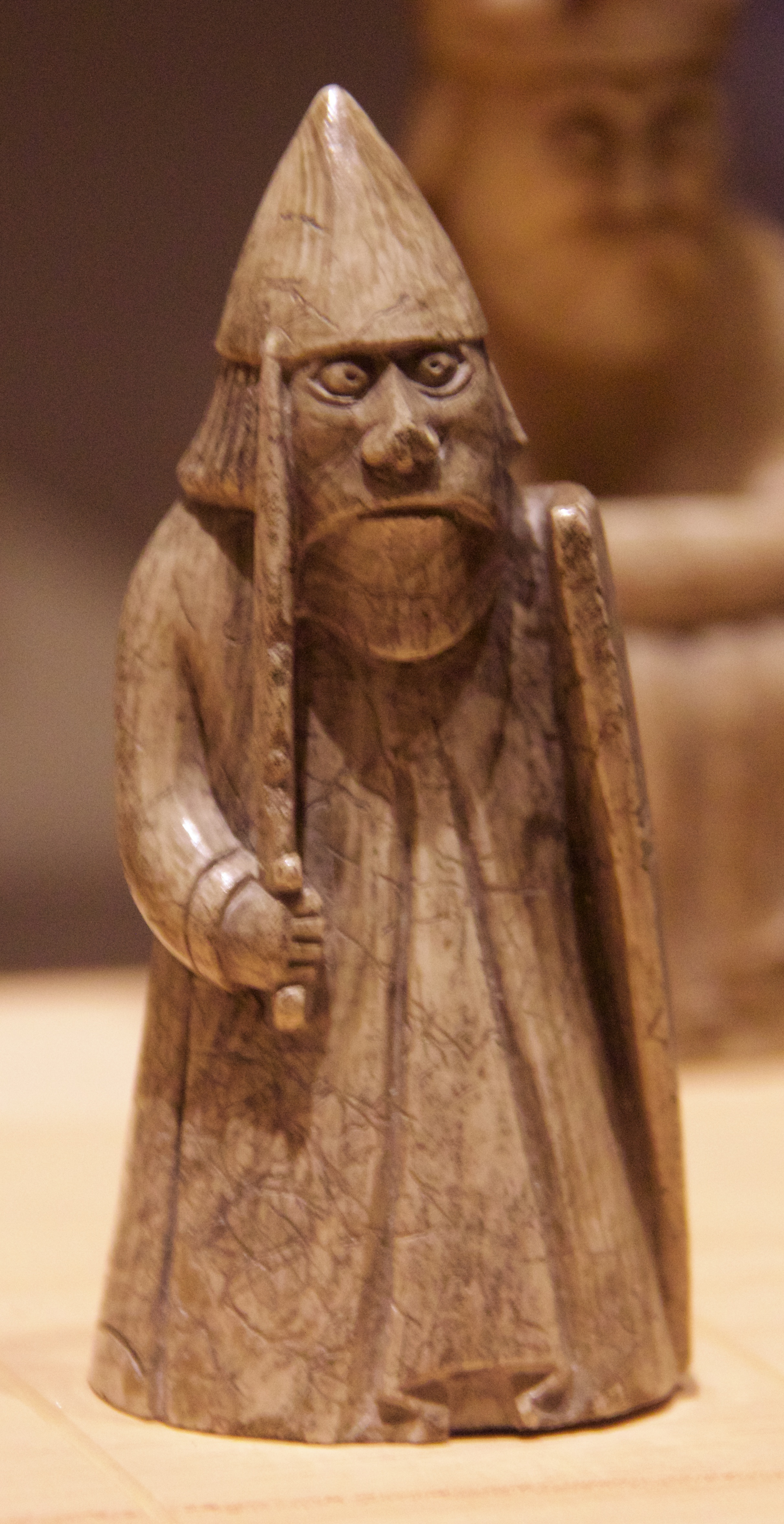
A rook gaming piece of the so-called Lewis chessmen

It is uncertain why Fergus failed to support his grandson against Somairle. The record of the capture of Domnall mac Máel Coluim at Whithorn in 1156, as recorded by the twelfth- to thirteenth-century Chronicle of Holyrood, and Gesta Annalia I, may have bearing on Fergus. Domnall appears to have been a son of Máel Coluim mac Alasdair, who was in turn a claimant to the Scottish throne and somehow related to Somairle. Following David's death in 1153, Somairle and Máel Coluim had risen in revolt against a newly inaugurated Malcolm without much success. Domnall's later capture in western Galloway, therefore, could be evidence that the Meic Máel Coluim claimants had attempted to forcefully carve out a power base in western Galloway. However, the fact that the chronicle makes no mention of such conflict in Galloway, coupled with the fact that Whithorn was a spiritual centre rather than a secular power centre, could suggest that Domnall was in the region under less violent circumstances. If so, it is conceivable that Fergus could have originally forged an understanding with the Meic Máel Coluim before pressure from his sons forced him to desert Domnall's cause. The fact that the latter's capture preceded Somairle's coup could suggest that, although Domnall may have been in the midst of securing Gallovidian support, once Somairle's designs against Guðrøðr became apparent, the Gallovdians handed over Somairle's kinsman to the Scots. (Note: Domnall's involvement in western Galloway may also hint at a possible connection between Somairle and Galloway, perhaps forming further evidence of kinship between Fergus and Somairle.)

== Scottish subjection of Galloway ==
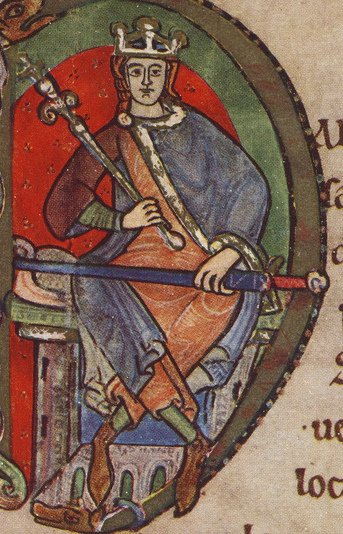
Malcolm IV, King of Scotland as he is depicted in a mid-twelfth-century royal charter

There is evidence to suggest that Fergus struggled to maintain control of his lordship during the decade. Such a crisis could well have kept him from intervening in the Isles on Guðrøðr's behalf. As with the latter, the failure of Muirchertach's mercenary fleet could have contributed to a loss of Fergus's own authority. Disarray in the lordship is evidenced by Vita Ailredi, which reveals that the region was wracked by inter-dynastic strife during this period.

In 1160, Malcolm returned to Scotland having spent months campaigning in the service of the English on the Continent. After successfully dealing with a considerable number of disaffected magnates at Perth, the Chronicle of Holyrood and the twelfth- to thirteenth-century Chronicle of Melrose reveal that he launched three military expeditions into Galloway. The circumstances surrounding these invasions is unclear, although what is clear is that Fergus submitted to the Scots before the end of the year. (Note: There is a fantastical account of Fergus's revolt preserved by Hystoria Fundacionis Prioratus Insule de Traile.) Specifically, according to Gesta Annalia I, once the Scots subdued the Gallovidians, the conquerors forced Fergus to retire to the abbey of Holyrood, and hand over his son, Uhtred, as a royal hostage. The Chronicle of Holyrood and the fifteenth-century Ordinale of Holyrood corroborate Fergus's monastic retirement, with the former source further recording Fergus's grant of the lands of Dunrod to the abbey. (Note: Later evidence reveals that Fergus's descendants chose to regard his submission and retirement as one of piety rather than political submission. The Ordinale of Holyrood reveals that the souls of Fergus, Uhtred, Roland, and Alan were commemorated at the abbey as late as the fifteenth century.)

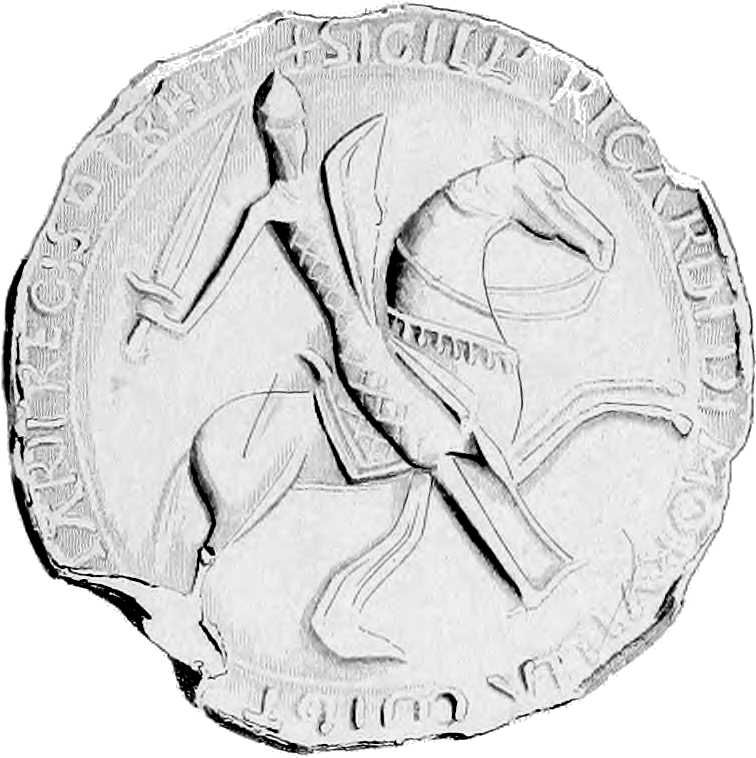
Seal of Richard de Morville, Constable of Scotland. The Morvilles were one of numerous knightly families used by the Scottish Crown to encircle Fergus's lordship. (Note: The Morville's were settled in Cunningham, north of Galloway. Richard himself was the father-in-law of Roland.)

On one hand, it is possible that Fergus himself had precipitated Malcolm's reaction by raiding into the territory between the rivers Urr and Nith. The fact that the Chronicle of Holyrood describes Malcolm's Gallovidian opponents as "federate enemies", and makes no mention of his sons, suggests that Fergus was supported by other accomplices. In fact, it is possible that Malcolm had encountered an alliance between Fergus and Somairle. Evidence of such a coalition may exist in the dating clause of a royal charter that notes a formal agreement between Somairle and Malcolm that Christmas. Additionally, the fact that several churches near Kirkcudbright are recorded to have once belonged to Iona, an ancient ecclesiastical centre that Somairle attempted to revive during his reign in the Isles, could suggest some sort of concord between the rulers. If Somairle and Fergus had indeed been allies, the fall of the latter, coupled with the further advancement of Scottish authority into the Solway region, may have finally brought Somairle to terms with the Scots. An alternate possibility is that the charter clause could be evidence that Somairle supported Malcolm in his suppression and destruction of Fergus. There is also reason to suspect that Ferteth, Earl of Strathearn possessed some sort of affiliation with Fergus. Not only does Ferteth appear to be the most prominent of the disaffected magnates who confronted Malcolm in 1160, but his father is recorded to have taken a leading part in the Battle of the Standard, and Ferteth himself was married to a woman whose name may be evidence that she was a native of Galloway. (Note: According to Ailred, there was much confusion and consternation on the Scottish side before the Battle of the Standard, with the Gallovidians claiming the right to occupy the front line. Ailred states that it was Ferteth's father, Máel Ísu I, Earl of Strathearn, who convinced David to acquiesce to his Gallovidian troops.) The kin-strife noted by Vita Ailredi could be evidence that Fergus's sons assisted in his overthrow, or at least did little to arrest it.

== Death and aftermath ==
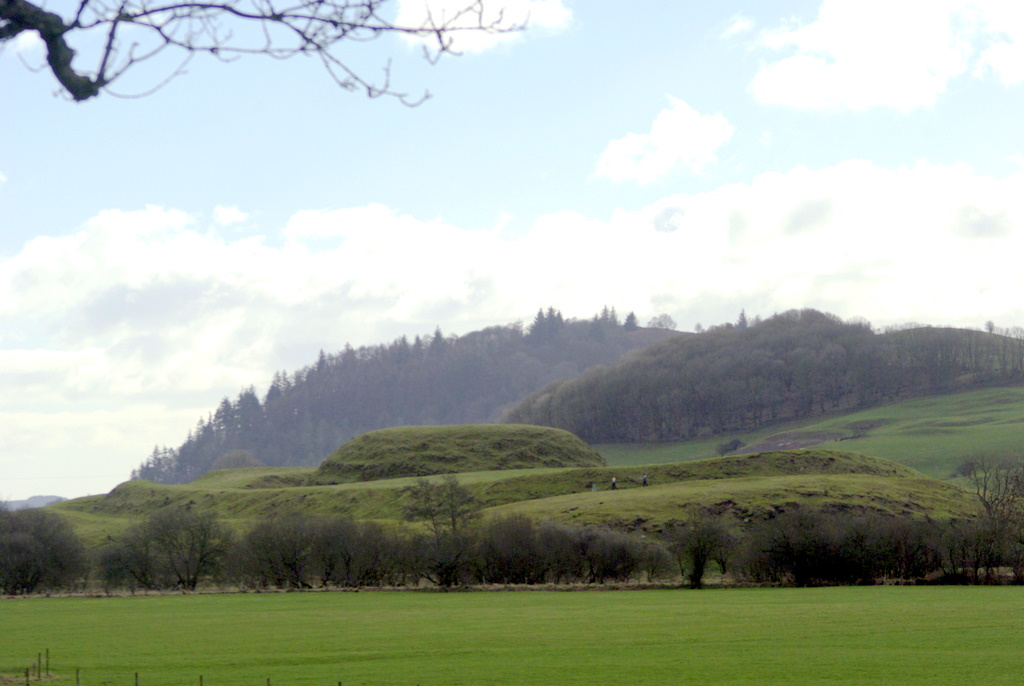
The remains of Motte of Urr, the earthen remains of a twelfth-century motte-and-bailey castle. The motte may have been the site of a castle of Walter de Berkeley, Chamberlain of Scotland, an Anglo-Norman settled in Galloway by Uhtred in the 1160s.

Fergus did not live long after retiring, and died on 12 May 1161, as evidenced by the Chronicle of Holyrood. Surviving sources reveal that he overshadowed his sons during his lifetime, with Uhtred witnessing only three charters and Gilla Brigte none at all. The latter's apparent exclusion from affairs of state could be relevant to the subsequent animosity between the siblings, as well as the difficulties Fergus faced with the men late in his career. Upon Fergus's death, the lordship appears to have been split between the brothers. Although there is no specific evidence for Gilla Brigte's share, later transactions involving Uhtred reveal that the latter held lands in the lower Dee valley, seemingly centred in an area around Kirkcudbright. The fact that this region appears to have formed the core of Fergus's holdings could be evidence that Uhtred was the senior successor. Conceivably, Uhtred's allotment consisted of the lordship's territory east of the river Cree, whilst Gilla Brigte's share was everything east of this waterway.

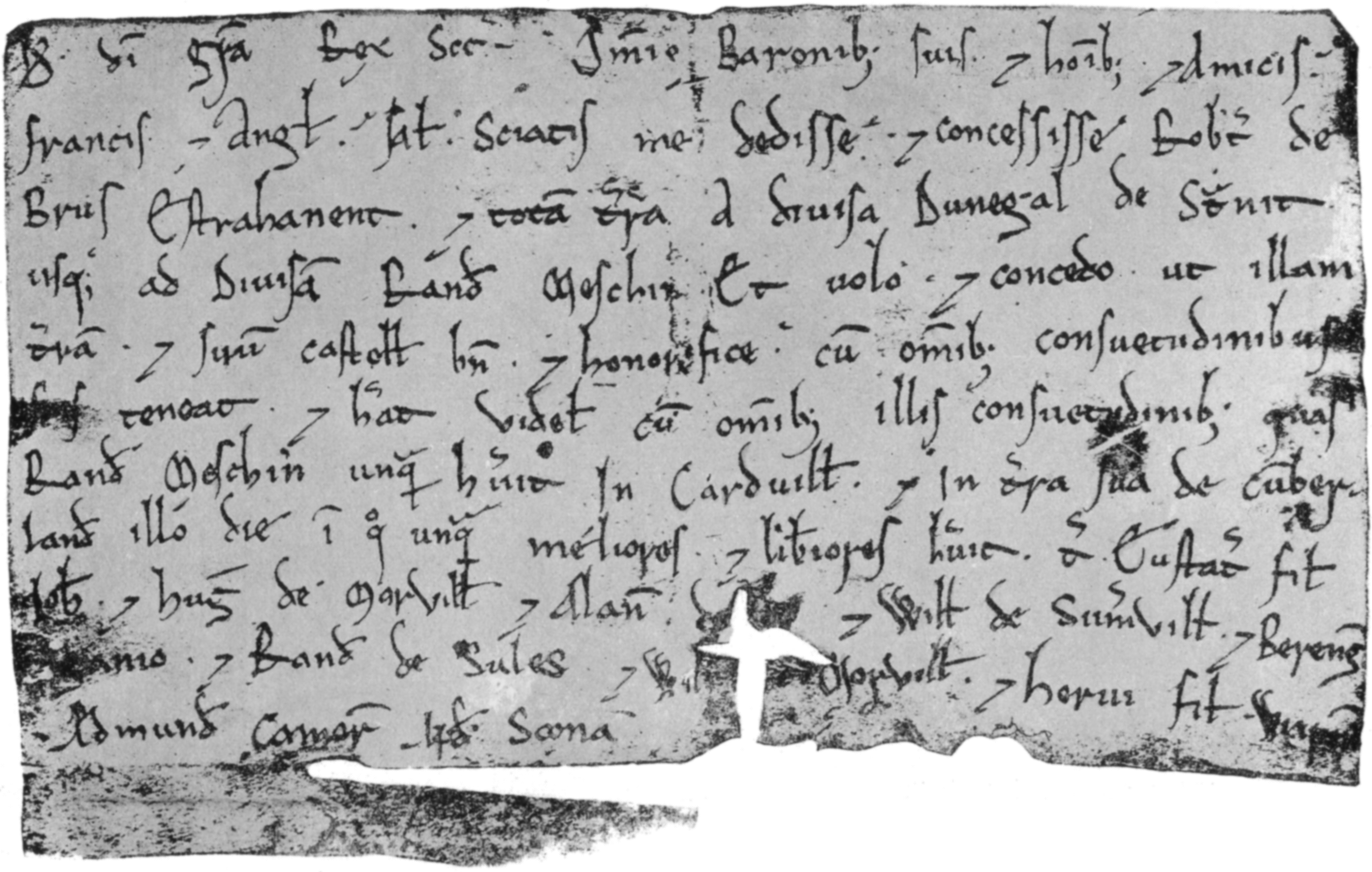
Charter of David to Robert de Brus concerning Annandale. The settlement of such men in southern Scotland may have been a means of countering the rise of Fergus.

In the wake of Malcolm's destruction of Fergus, the Scottish Crown moved to further incorporate Galloway into the Scottish realm. Uhtred appears to have been granted the territory between the rivers Nith and Urr, whilst Gilla Brigte may have been wed to a daughter or sister of Donnchad II, Earl of Fife, the kingdom's foremost Gaelic magnate. Scottish authority penetrated into the lordship through the installation of royal officials, and Scottish power was perhaps further projected into Galloway by a royal castle at Dumfries. Surviving royal acta dating to after the fall of Fergus indicate that, from the perspective of the Scottish Crown, the Lordship of Galloway had been integrated into the Kingdom of Scotland, and was subject to the overlordship of Malcolm himself.

== Citations ==
Regnal titles
Unknown	Lord of Galloway ×1160	Succeeded by Gilla Brigte
Unknown	Lord of Galloway ×1160	Succeeded by Uhtred
