= Glencarnie =

Provincial lordship in Strathspey, Scotland

Glencarnie was a provincial lordship in Strathspey, Scotland, co-extensive with the parish of Duthil. It was, alongside Badenoch, Lochaber, The Aird, Stratha'an, Abernethy, Strathbogie and Garioch, one of the eight militarised provincial lordships north of the Mounth that were first documented in the reign of William the Lion and held by families loyal to the crown. These may have been created to secure the Province of Moray during the uprisings of the MacWilliams between 1180 and 1230, or may be the result of an earlier plan to establish royal control over the valley of the Spey dating back to the defeat of Oengus of Moray at the Battle of Stracathro in 1130.

The lordship was associated with the family of the Earls of Strathearn for over 200 years until 1392, when it was exchanged with Thomas Dunbar, 5th Earl of Moray for the lands of Easter and Wester Fochabers.

== Bibliography ==
- Ross, Alasdair (2003). "The Lords and Lordship of Glencarnie". In Boardman, Steve; Ross, Alasdair (eds.). The Exercise of Power in Medieval Scotland, 1200-1500. Four Courts Press. pp. 159–174. ISBN 1851827498.
