= House of Moray =

Medieval Scottish family

The House of Moray or Clann Ruaidrí (Note: Not to be confused with the 13th–14th-century Clann Ruaidhrí.) is a historiographical and genealogical construct to illustrate the succession of rulers whose base was in Moray and who ruled sometimes a larger kingdom, mainly the Kingdom of Scotland. An important feature of Scottish politics throughout the 11th century, they reached the height of their power with the reign of Macbeth between 1040 and 1057.

Clann Ruaidrí first appears in the documentary record in 1020 with the killing of Findláech mac Ruaidrí by his nephews, the sons of Máel Brigte. Findláech's death is recorded in both the Annals of Tigernach, where he is described as Mormaer of Moray, and the Annals of Ulster, where he is described as King of Alba.

Clann Ruaidri has been claimed to have been descended in the male line from the Cenél Loairn, one of the ruling kindreds of Gaelic Dál Riata, based on a genealogy of Máel Snechtai reproduced in four Irish manuscripts. This genealogy has now been shown to be a clear and chronologically impossible fabrication made in the 11th or 12th century, constructed by joining three existing genealogies together. The pedigree lists only one further name beyond the ancestors of Máel Snechtai already identifiable from annalistic sources — that of Domnall, the father of Ruaidrí, who was the father of Findláech of Moray. The immediate ancestor of Domnall is given as Mongán mac Domnaill, who in fact died c. 700, over three centuries before the death of Findláech in 1020.

At the times when the rival house held the throne, the Moray leaders usually had their effectively independent state of Moray, where a succession of kings (kinglets) or mormaers ruled.

The succession followed quite loyally the rules of tanistry, resulting in practice to outcomes where branches of the leaders' extended family rotated on the rulership, possibly keeping a balance between important branches. This is quite typical for tribal societies, where primogeniture is much less usual than agnatic seniority or turns on the throne. For example, Macbeth, King of Scotland descended from one branch, and his stepson Lulach from another.

== Genealogy and recorded titles ==
Clann Ruaidrí or the "House of Moray"

Ruaidrí (fl. c. 1000)
Máel Brigte (fl. c. 1000) | Findláech (d. 1020); King of Scotland
Máel Coluim (d. 1029); King of Scotland | Gille Coemgáin (d. 1032); Mormaer of Moray | Mac Bethad (d. 1057); Over-king
Lulach (d. 1058); Over-king
Máel Snechtai (d. 1085); King of Moray | Daughter (fl. 1080) m. unknown
Óengus (d. 1130); King of Moray

== See also ==
- Scotland in the Early Middle Ages
- Scotland in the High Middle Ages
- Scottish monarchs family tree
- Style of the monarchs of Scotland

== Bibliography ==
- Broun, Dauvit (2019). "The genealogy of the king of Scots as charter and panegyric". In Davies, John Reuben; Bhattacharya, Swapna (eds.). Copper, Parchment, and Stone - Studies in the sources for landholdingand lordship in early medieval Bengal and medieval Scotland. Glasgow: University of Glasgow Centre for Scottish and Celtic Studies. pp. 209–260. ISBN 9780852619575.
- McGuigan, Neil (2021). Máel Coluim III, 'Canmore': An Eleventh-Century King. Edinburgh: John Donald. ISBN 9781910900192.
- Ross, Alasdair (2011). The Kings Of Alba: c.1000-c.1130. Edinburgh: John Donald. ISBN 9781906566159.
- Woolf, Alex (2000). "The 'Moray Question' and the Kingship of Alba in the Tenth and Eleventh Centuries". Scottish Historical Review. 79 (2): 145–164. doi:10.3366/shr.2000.79.2.145. S2CID 162334631.
- Woolf, Alex (2007). From Pictland to Alba 789–1070. Edinburgh: Edinburgh University Press. ISBN 9780748612345.
