= Province of Moray =

Former lordship of the medieval Kingdom of Scotland

Moray (Middle Irish: Muréb; Medieval Latin: Moravia; Old Norse: Mýræfi) was a province within the area of modern-day Scotland, that may at times up to the 12th century have operated as an independent kingdom or as a power base for competing claimants to the Kingdom of Alba. It covered a much larger territory than the modern council area of Moray, extending approximately from the River Spey in the east to the River Beauly in the north, and encompassing Badenoch, Lochaber and Lochalsh in the south and west.

Moray emerged in the 10th century as a successor to the dominant Pictish kingdom of Fortriu. The status of its rulers was ambiguous: being described in some sources as mormaers, in others as Kings of Moray, and in others as Kings of Alba. The ruling kin-group of Moray, sometimes called the House of Moray, attained the throne of Alba between 1040 and 1058 in the person of Mac Bethad mac Findláich (Shakespeare's Macbeth) and his stepson Lulach. After Lulach was killed and succeeded by Máel Coluim mac Donnchada of the House of Dunkeld, Lulach's son Máel Snechtai and grandson Óengus continued to rule Moray and challenge the kings to the south until Óengus' defeat and death at the Battle of Stracathro in 1130.

Over the following decades David I of Scotland and his successors established institutions to bring Moray more directly under Scottish control, suppressing the office of mormaer, founding monasteries, burghs and sheriffdoms within the province, and granting large areas of it as provincial lordships to loyal followers. However Moray continued to be a base for rebellions by the Meic Uilleims, the descendants of the last mormaer William fitz Duncan, until the last of the line was killed in 1230.

== Name ==
The placename "Moray" could have either a Pictish or a Gaelic origin, but its earliest attested form as Moreb makes a Pictish origin more likely. Moreb is cognate with the Middle Welsh moreb and Cornish morab, which survives as murriph in Cornish English, all of which mean "low lying land near to the sea". William Watson's earlier derivation of Moray from the unattested Gaelic *mori-treb meaning "sea-settlement" is now considered less likely.

Historians have suggested that the topographical nature of the placenames of Moray and Ross, coupled with their origins as local divisions of the kingdom of Fortriu, may mean that they were originally qualified as Mureb Fortrenn and Ros Fortrenn, respectively the "Coastland of Fortriu" and "Headland of Fortriu". While there is no direct evidence of the provinces having these names, it is possible that the phrase "ros (headland) of Fortriu" may underlie the place-name Fortrose, referring to nearby Chanonry Point.

== Geography ==
In the century or two before 1130 the name Moray described a polity far larger than the later county or council area of the same name.

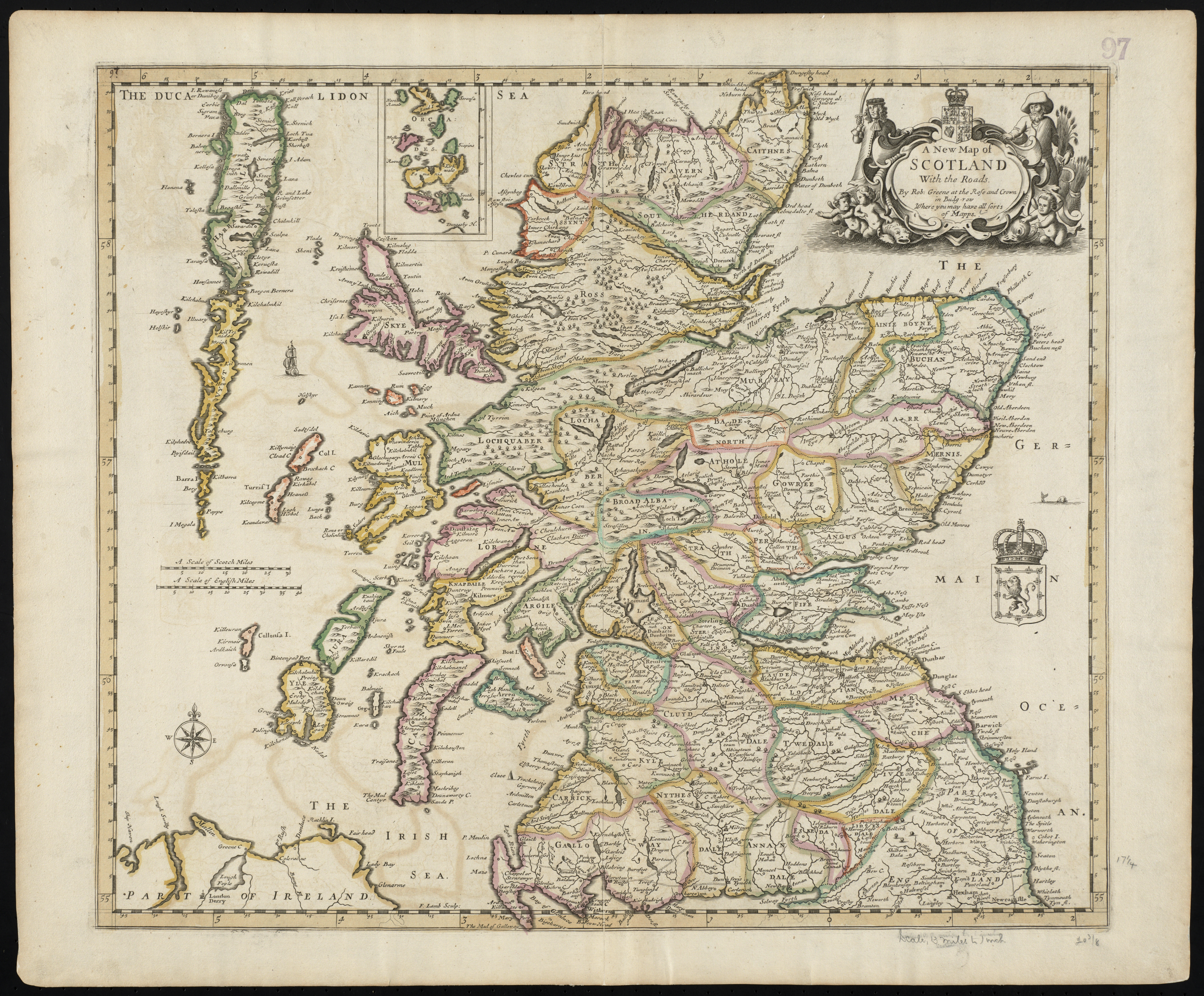
Map of Scottish provinces of 1689 showing the larger Moray stretching from the coast west of Loch Ness eastwards to the River Spey

The boundaries of Moray were explicitly documented in the charter of Robert the Bruce that granted the recreated earldom to Thomas Randolph in 1312. The eastern boundary of the province was described as following the River Spey south from its mouth, though including all of the lands of Fochabers, Rathenach, Rothes and Boharm, and all of the lordships of Badenoch, Kincardine, Glencarnie and Lochaber, all of which also included land on the east bank of the river. North of Lochaber the province included Glenelg on the west coast – an area described as "Argyll of Moray" – from where the northern boundary of the province followed the River Beauly to the Moray Firth. Unusually, this document does not name any perambulators, so probably reflects an earlier perambulation of the borders, most likely dating from the period when Moray was taken into crown hands after 1130.

Before the early 13th century Moray was not considered part of "Scotland" (Latin: Scotia, Old Irish: Alba) which was thought to extend only between the Firth of Forth and the River Spey. As late as 1214 the Gesta Annalia recorded how William the Lion "returned from Moray to Scotland, and progressed from Scotland into Lothian". Placename evidence also suggests that the people of Moray did not consider themselves "Scots".

== History ==
=== Origins and early history ===
Moray and neighbouring Ross were the heartlands of the powerful Pictish kingdom of Fortriu, which was last recorded in entries in the Annals of Ulster in 904, and in the Fragmentary Annals of Ireland in 918, and from which both Moray and Ross probably emerged as successor polities in the 10th century. Moray is first recorded in a reference in the Chronicle of the Kings of Alba describing how Malcolm I of Scotland, who reigned from 943 to 954, "crossed into Moray and slew Cellach". The identity of this Cellach is not known: while it is possible that he was a ruler of Moray, the name was a common one during this period. The entry does however imply that Moray at this time did not lie within Malcolm I's home territory.

There is no direct mention of Moray in any other contemporary record from the 10th century, but circumstantial evidence suggests that Moray was probably the home territory for some of the Kings of Alba during the period. From 889 until 997 the Kingship of Alba alternated between two distinct families descended from two sons of Kenneth MacAlpin: Clann Aeda, the descendants of King Áed, and Clann Chausantin, the descendants of Constantine I. Surviving records show the kings of Clann Chausantin constantly in conflict with the men of Moray: Donald II is recorded in the Chronicle of Melrose and the Pictish King lists dying at Forres in 900; Malcolm I is recorded in the same sources being "killed by the Moravians by treachery" at Blervie, just south of Forres, in 954; and King Dub is recorded in the Annals of Ulster being killed in Forres "by the Scots themselves" in 967, with his body being hidden under the bridge at nearby Kinloss. Although some sources record other locations for the deaths of these kings, no kings from Clann Chausantin are recorded in any source as being killed south of the Mounth. In contrast no kings from Clann Aeda seem to have faced opposition in the north. and the one recorded being killed north of the Mounth was Ildulb, who died at Cullen at the hands of the Vikings. It therefore seems likely that Moray was the power base for Clann Aeda, while Clann Chausantin were probably based south of the Grampian Mountains.

Forres appears to have been the major political centre of Moray during this period, a status it probably inherited after the destruction of Burghead Fort by Vikings in the 9th century, and which may be commemorated by the monumental carved Sueno's Stone that survives on the outskirts of the modern town. The rulers of Moray appear to have controlled the more easterly provinces of Buchan and Mar until the 12th century, but the extent of their power to the north is unclear.

Njal's Saga, a Saga of the Icelanders, mentions Mormaers and Kings in northern Scotland from the later 10th century, namely Jarl Melsnatr (Máel Snechtai) and King Melkofr (Máel Coluim) of "Scotland". Both date from the period 976 to 995. However no king named Máel Coluim reigned in Scotland in this period. Njal's Saga was not written as a historical guide for details outside Iceland or Scandinavia and the text is notoriously unreliable.

=== 1014 to 1130: Dynasty of Findláich to Óengus ===
Moray was ruled by a Gaelic-speaking dynasty, the most notable perhaps being King Macbeth of Scotland, who ruled from 1040 to 1057. These rulers were sometimes styled Ri meaning king or mormaer meaning great steward.

Irish annals record the killing of Findláech, son of Ruaidri, 'mormaer of Moray', in 1020 by the sons of his brother, Mael Brigte. Both Findlaech and Mael Coluim are styled 'king of Alba' rather than 'of Moray' in one obituary but this may be an error or exaggeration. Mael Coluim's brother and successor, Gillie Coemgáin is recorded as Mormaer of Moray. The death of Mael Coluim, son of Mael Brigte, is recorded in 1029 and, in 1032 that of his brother Gilla Comgain, killed along with 50 of his men.

Gilla Comgain's successor and probably also his killer, was his cousin Macbeth (Mac Bethad mac Findlaig). Macbeth married Gilla Comgain's widow Gruoch, a princess of the mac Alpin dynasty, and became king of Scots in 1040, after defeating and killing Duncan I of Scotland (Donnchad ua Mail Choluim) in battle. Later sources suggest that MacBeth had a claim to the Scottish throne through his mother, but his Gaelic pedigree, on record only two generations after his death, traces his descent through his father Findlaech, and grandfather Ruaidri, from the house of Loarn, Kings of Dál Riata.

The pedigree of Macbeth from the Loarn kings of Dál Riata offers a clue to the origins of his dynasty in Moray. Moray may have been a separate kingdom for a time, independent of the dynasty of Kenneth mac Alpin. However it seems likely that rulers of Moray were subject loosely to the Kings of Alba. Moray acted as a buffer against further Scandinavian penetration from the north, and its rulers were remembered with respect in Scandinavian sources such as Orkneyinga Saga.

Macbeth himself was in turn killed and defeated in 1057. After which, his stepson Lulach, son of Gilla Comgain, and Gruoch, claimed the Scottish throne briefly before being himself killed in 1058. Lulach's son, Mael Snechtai, died in 1085 as 'king of Moray'. Later, an earl named Aed or 'Heth' who witnesses royal charters early in the next century may also have been based in Moray. The last ruling member of the dynasty, styled 'king' or 'earl' of Moray, was Óengus (Angus) son of the daughter of Lulach. Óengus (Angus) challenged David I of Scotland in battle, but was defeated and killed at Stracathro in Angus, in 1130 and thus the Kingdom of Moray was destroyed by David I of Scotland.

Claims that William fitz Duncan became the last Mormaer of Moray cannot be substantiated and his claim for the Scottish throne proved unsuccessful. Malcolm MacHeth, who rebelled against David I, but was later made Earl of Ross may have been related to the old rulers of Moray, as may also have been the mysterious Wimund. Later MacHeth claimants to Moray were unsuccessful.

=== After 1130: Suppression of Moray ===
David I of Scotland's suppression of the Kingdom of Moray in 1130 did not mark the end of the province's significance or of the problems its management caused to the kings of Scotland. Despite the expulsion of its line of rulers, Moray continued to be referred to in the early 13th century as a land separate to Scotia. Even when the realm of Scotland was recognised as stretching as far north as Caithness, Moray was still recognised as one of the chief northern provinces. The Gaelic notes in the Book of Deer dating from the mid 12th century offer a glimpse of the holding of land and the ordering of society in Moray.

The actions of the crown's royal government during the century after 1130 seemed to create differences between the upland regions of the province and the coastal districts of the Laich of Moray, between the River Spey and Inverness. The crown's existing estates were concentrated in these coastal regions and between 1130 and 1230 the kings established sheriffdoms or shires centred on Inverness, Nairn, Forres and Elgin, providing a framework for royal authority in the province.

The extension of royal government was accompanied by the settlement of immigrants in the Laich of Moray. Lands were given to the crown's supporters, the most important of whom was Freskin, who was of Flemish – Norman descent. Freskin founded the 'de Moravia' or 'Moray family'. The senior line of de Moravias would later become Earls of Sutherland, chiefs of Clan Sutherland until the line passed via the female line to the Gordon family. Another branch of the same family who took the name Murray were the Murrays of Bothwell, and yet another line who may be related to this branch, became chiefs of Clan Murray and later Earls of Atholl.

The final area of change in the province of Moray after 1130 was religion. There was a Bishop of Moray before 1130, however a Diocese of Moray with an established centre at Elgin Cathedral with a parochial structure was achieved only during the 13th century. Reformed religious houses were founded at Beauly, Pluscarden and Kinloss.

While the changes that took place in the centuries following the 1130 defeat of the kings of Moray secured the Laich of Moray under the authority of the crown, the interior of the province from Lochalsh to Strathbogie remained a source of difficulty and threat. Attempts to revive the old earldom of Moray and challenge the king of Scotland found support in these areas. Leaders such as Wimund, the son of the Earl of Angus and the MacWilliam family were able to raise allies from the Gaelic uplands of Moray which led to warfare in the region from the 1140s to the 1220s. The kings normally left the defeat of these enemies to their aristocratic vassals. The interior of the province from the Great Glen to Strathbogie was divided between six or more families, the greatest of which, at this time was the Clan Comyn lords of Badenoch and Lochaber.

=== 1296 to 1346: Wars of Independence and creation of the earldom of Moray ===
Moray's importance as part of the kingdom of Scotland was demonstrated during the years of major warfare between 1296 and 1340. The province was relatively untouched by direct fighting and Royal-led English armies penetrated Moray on only three occasions in 1296, 1303 and 1335, and significant English occupation occurred only in 1296–97. This security meant that it was a vital refuge and recruitment ground for the Scottish guardians between 1297 and 1303, and provided Robert I of Scotland with a base and allies during his northern campaign against the Comyns and their allies in 1307–08. The province was forced to submit to Edward I of England in 1303 and Robert I of Scotland therefore clearly recognised the significance of Moray for the security of his realm. In 1312 Robert I re-established the earldom of Moray for his nephew, Thomas Randolph, 1st Earl of Moray. The new earldom included all of the old province and the crown lands of the Laich.

Thomas's son John Randolph was killed in 1346, leaving no heir and the other noble families including the Comyns, Strathbogies and Morays had all disappeared from or left the province by between 1300 and 1350. With the absence of noble leaders, power fell to lesser figures who functioned in kin-based groups such as the Clan Donnachaidh of Atholl and the Chattan Confederation which centred on Badenoch. This drew in lords and men from outside of the province, from further south such as the Dunbars and Stewarts who staked claims to rule the province of Moray. In 1372 the earldom of Moray was divided between them with John Dunbar receiving the coastal districts and Alexander Stewart, favourite son of Robert II of Scotland being made lord of Badenoch in the uplands

== Relationship to later territories ==
Across Scotland, the shires which had been created after the 12th century were gradually given more administrative functions. By contrast, the older provinces under the authority of mormaers, earls or other nobles declined in significance, albeit were never explicitly abolished. The shires which broadly covered the province of Moray were Elginshire, Nairnshire, parts of Banffshire, and most of the mainland part of Inverness-shire.

Elginshire was seen as the core of the old Moray territory, and so in 1919 Elginshire County Council changed its name to Moray County Council. The county's statutory name was subsequently changed from Elgin to Moray in 1947. The county of Moray ceased to be used for local government purposes in 1975, when a new Moray district was created covering most of the pre-1975 county of Moray plus western parts of Banffshire. The district of Moray was redesignated as a council area in 1996.

== Comparative Moravian and Scottish genealogies ==
This table is a comparison of the genealogies apparently used by the Kings of Muireb and of (southern) Alba. Both trace their descent to Erc of Dalriada. All three, incidentally, are called King of Alba in the manuscript.

Comparative Genealogies from the Genelaig Albanensium, dating to the early 11th century
Genealogy of Máel Snechtai	Genealogy of Macbethad	Genealogy of Máel Colum II
Máel Snechtai; Lulach; Gille Comgáin; Máel Brigte; Ruadrí; Domnall; Morggán; Cathamal; Ruadrí; Ailgelach; Ferchar; Feradach; Fergus; Nechtan; Colmán; Báetán; Echdach; Muiredach; Loarn (hence Cenél Loairn); Ercc; Echdach Muinremuir	–; –; Macbethad; Findláech; Ruadrí; Domnall; Morggán; Cathamal; –; –; –; –; –; –; –; –; –; –; –; –; –	–; –; –; Máel Coluim; Cináed; Máel Coluim; Domnall; Causantín; Cináed; Alpín; Eochaid; Áed Find; Domangard; Domnall Brecc; Eochaid Buide; Áedan; Gabrán (hence Cenél nGabráin); Domangard; Fergus (Mór); Ercc; Echach Muinremuir

== List of Mormaers ==
The following names and dates are based on people named in sources. All are Moravians named in sources either as King of Scotland or just Mormaer. The beginning and end dates are virtually always based on known death date, and assuming the next named successor actually did succeed, and succeeded immediately:

Kings/Mormaers of Moray
Findláech mac Ruaidrí	before 1014–1020
Máel Coluim mac Máil Brigti	1020–1029
Gille Coemgáin mac Máil Brigti	1029–1032
Mac Bethad mac Findláich (?)	1032–1057 (?)
Lulach mac Gille Coemgáin (?)	1057–1058 (?)
Máel Snechtai mac Lulaich	? 1058-1078/1085
?
Óengus	?-1130
? William fitz Duncan	1130s–1147
Annexed to Kingdom of Scotland.

== See also ==
- Fortriu
- Earl of Moray

== Bibliography ==
=== Primary sources ===
- Anderson, Alan Orr (1922). Early sources of Scottish history, A.D. 500 to 1286. Edinburgh: Oliver and Boyd.
- Anderson, Alan Orr, Scottish Annals from English Chroniclers: AD 500–1286, (London, 1908), republished, Marjorie Anderson (ed.) (Stamford, 1991)

=== Secondary sources ===
- Anderson, Marjorie O., Kings and Kingship in Early Scotland, (Edinburgh, 1973)
- Barrett, John R. (2019). The Civilisation of Moray: Burghs in the Landscape and the Landscape of Burghs, C.1150 – C.1250. Aberdeen: Aberdeen University.
- Broun, Dauvit (2007). Scottish Independence and the Idea of Britain From the Picts to Alexander III. Edinburgh: Edinburgh University Press. ISBN 9780748623617.
- Evans, Nicholas (2019). "A historical introduction to the northern Picts". In Noble, Gordon; Evans, Nicholas (eds.). The King in the North: The Pictish realms of Fortriu and Ce. Collected essays written as part of the University of Aberdeen's Northern Picts project. Edinburgh: Birlinn. pp. 10–38. ISBN 9781780275512.
- Grant, Alexander, "The Province of Ross and the Kingdom of Alba" in E.J. Cowan and R.Andrew McDonald (eds.) Alba: Celtic Scotland in the Medieval Era, (Edinburgh, 2000)
- Jackson, Kenneth (ed), The Gaelic Notes in the Book of Deer (The Osborn Bergin * Memorial Lecture 1970), (Cambridge (1972)
- Hudson, Benjamin T., Kings of Celtic Scotland, (Westport, 1994)
- McGuigan, Neil (2021). Máel Coluim III, 'Canmore': An Eleventh-Century King. Edinburgh: John Donald. ISBN 9781910900192.
- Roberts, John L., Lost Kingdoms: Celtic Scotland in the Middle Ages, (Edinburgh, 1997)
- Ross, Alasdair (2011). The Kings Of Alba: c.1000-c.1130. Edinburgh: John Donald. ISBN 9781906566159.
- Ross, Alasdair (2015). Land Assessment and Lordship in Medieval Northern Scotland. Turnhout: Brepols. ISBN 9782503541334.
- Sellar, W. D. H.; Brown, Michael (2001). "Moray". In Lynch, Michael (ed.). Oxford Companion to Scottish History. Oxford: Oxford University Press. pp. 428–430. ISBN 0199234825.
- Woolf, Alex (2000). "The 'Moray Question' and the Kingship of Alba in the Tenth and Eleventh Centuries". Scottish Historical Review. 79 (2): 145–164. doi:10.3366/shr.2000.79.2.145. S2CID 162334631.
- Woolf, Alex (October 2006). "Dén Nechtain, Fortriu and the Geography of the Picts". Scottish Historical Review. 85 (2): 182–201. doi:10.3366/shr.2007.0029. ISSN 0036-9241. S2CID 161978981.
- Woolf, Alex (2007). From Pictland to Alba 789–1070. Edinburgh: Edinburgh University Press. ISBN 9780748612345.
