= Gaelicisation =

Act or process of making something Gaelic

Gaelicisation, or Gaelicization, is the act or process of making something Gaelic or gaining characteristics of the Gaels, a sub-branch of Celticisation. The Gaels are an ethno-linguistic group, traditionally viewed as having spread from Ireland to Scotland and the Isle of Man.

Gaelic (or Goidelic), as a linguistic term, refers to the Gaelic languages but can also refer to the transmission of any other Gaelic cultural feature such as social norms and customs, music and sport. It is often referred to as a part of Celtic identity since Ireland, Scotland and the Isle of Man are all considered Celtic nations, and the Gaelic languages are considered a sub-group of the Celtic languages.

== Early history ==
Examples of ethnic groups that have gone through a period of Gaelicisation in history include the Norse-Gaels, the Picts, the Britons of south-western Scotland, the Scoto-Normans, and the Hiberno-Normans. Picts, whose language is believed to be Brythonic or of a close distinct Insular Celtic branch, have been fully assimilated by Gaelic culture and language during 12th and 13th centuries, as last Pictish names date to 14th century.

== Modern era ==
Today, Gaelicisation, or more often re-Gaelicisation, of placenames, surnames and given names is often a deliberate effort to help promote the languages and to counteract centuries of anglicisation.

=== Isle of Man ===
Manx, a language that is very similar to Irish, has undergone a major revival in recent years, although Manx is so rarely used that it was even mislabelled as extinct by a United Nations report as recently as 2009. The decline of the language on the island was primarily as a result of stigmatisation and high levels of emigration to England.

There are now primary schools teaching in the medium of Manx Gaelic; efforts are modelled mainly on the Irish system. The efforts have been widely praised, with further developments such as using technology to teach the language being put into place.

=== Ireland ===
Estimates of numbers of native speakers of Irish in the Republic of Ireland in 2000 ranged from 20,000 to 80,000. According to the 2006 census for the Republic, 85,000 people used Irish daily outside of school and 1.2 million used Irish at least occasionally. In the 2011 Census, these numbers increased to 94,000 and 1.3 million, respectively. Active Irish speakers probably comprise 5 to 10 per cent of Ireland's population.

In recent decades, there has been a significant increase in the number of urban Irish speakers, particularly in Dublin. The dispersed but large, educated and middle-class urban Gaeilgeoir community enjoys a lively cultural life and is buoyed by the growth of Irish medium education and Irish-language media.

In some official Gaeltachtaí (Irish-speaking regions) areas, Irish remains a vernacular language alongside English.

In Northern Ireland, the Gaelicisation process is significantly slower and less-supported than elsewhere on the island and the status of the Irish language in Northern Ireland is the subject of heated political debates.

=== Scotland ===
In Scotland, Scottish Gaelic and traditional Gaelic customs such those manifested at the Highland Games, with traditional sports such as the caber toss, are mainly restricted to the Highlands and islands. In the 21st century, Scottish Gaelic literature has seen development and challenges within the area of prose fiction publication, and phrases such as Alba gu bràth may be used today as a catch-phrase or rallying cry. Gaelicised areas are referred to as Gàidhealtachd.

== See also ==
- Celticisation
- Hiberno-Normans
- More Irish than the Irish themselves
- Norman Ireland
- Norse-Gaels
- Old English (Ireland)
- Scotland in the High Middle Ages
- Statutes of Kilkenny

== Bibliography ==
- Ball, Martin J. & Fife, James (eds.) The Celtic Languages (Routledge Language Family Descriptions Series), (2002)
