= Erin go bragh =

Anglicised Irish language phrase

Representation of the flag of Los San Patricios

Erin go Bragh (/ˌɛrɪn ɡə ˈbrɑː/ ERR-in gə BRAH), sometimes Erin go Braugh, is the anglicisation of an Irish language phrase, Éirinn go Brách, and is used to express allegiance to Ireland. It is most often translated as "Ireland Forever."

== Origin ==
Erin go Bragh is an anglicisation of the phrase Éirinn go Brách in the Irish language.

The standard version in Irish is Éire go Brách, which is pronounced [ˈeːɾʲə ɡə ˈbˠɾˠaːx]. Some uses of the phrase will use Éirinn, which survives as the dative form in the modern standard form of Irish and is the source of the poetic form, Erin.

The term brách is equivalent to "eternity" or "end of time", meaning the phrase may be translated literally as "Ireland until eternity" or "Ireland to the end (of time)". Éire go Bráth (or Éirinn go Bráth) is also used in Irish and means the same thing. Go is a preposition, translatable as "to", "till/until", "up to".

== Usage ==
=== United Irishmen ===
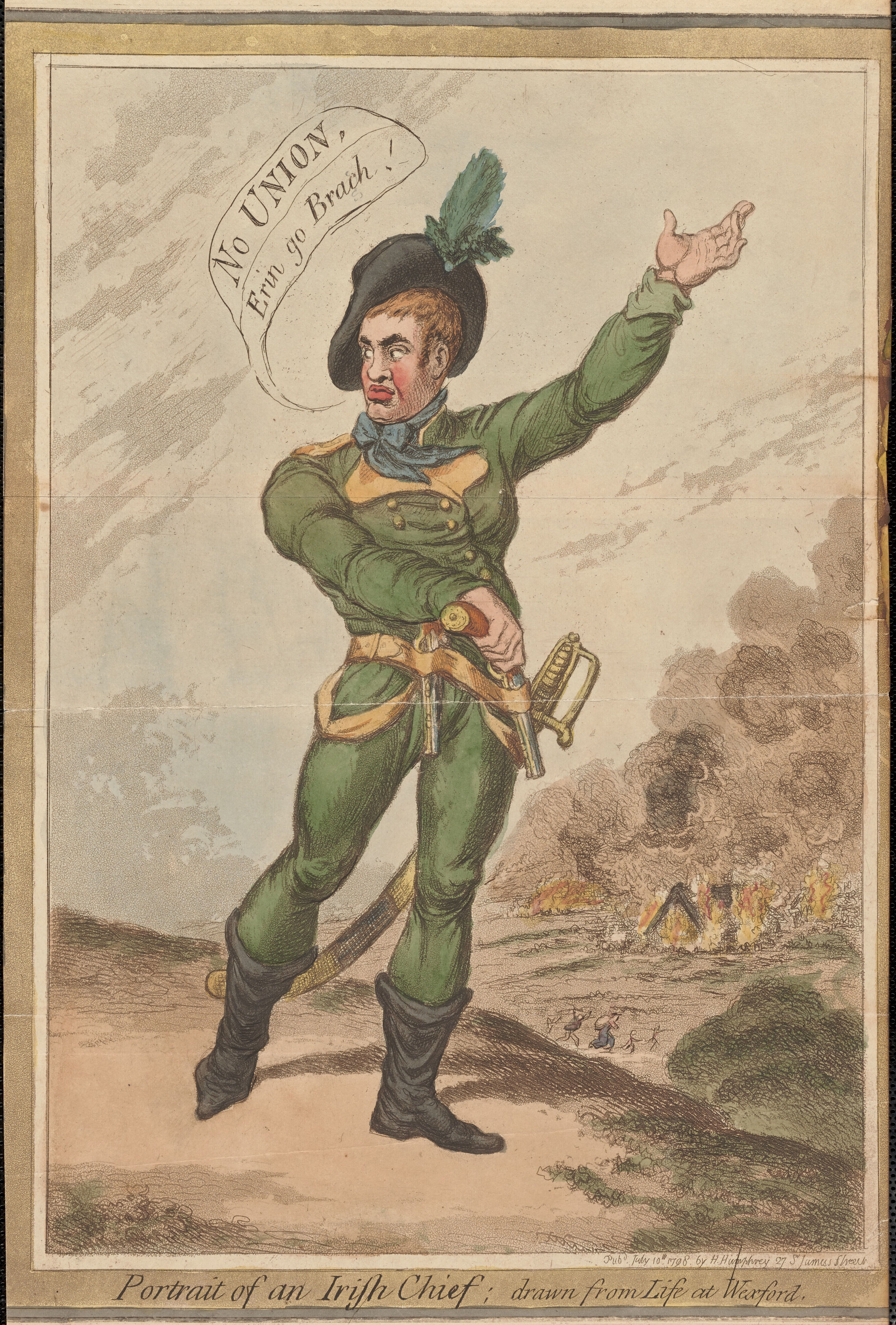
1798 caricature of Henry Grattan showing him saying the phrase

The phrase was used by the United Irishmen organisation in the 1790s.

=== Emigrant nationalism ===
In 1847, a group of Irish volunteers, including U.S. Army deserters, joined the Mexican side in the Mexican–American War. These soldiers, known as Los San Patricios or Saint Patrick's Battalion, flew as their standard a green flag with a harp and the motto Erin Go Bragh. Similar flag designs have been used at different times to express Irish nationalism.

In 1862, when a large number of families on the estate of Lord Digby, near Tullamore, County Offaly, were given notice to quit, a local priest, Father Paddy Dunne, arranged passage for 400 people to Australia. A ship was chartered from the Black Ball Line and named the Erin-go-Bragh. The voyage of the Erin-go-Bragh, a "crazy, leaky tub", took 196 days, the longest recorded passage to Australia. A passenger nicknamed the ship the "Erin-go-Slow", but eventually it landed in Moreton Bay near Brisbane.

A pub in Sydney, Australia, in the 19th century that catered to Irish immigrants was called The Erin-Go-Bragh.

=== Unionism ===
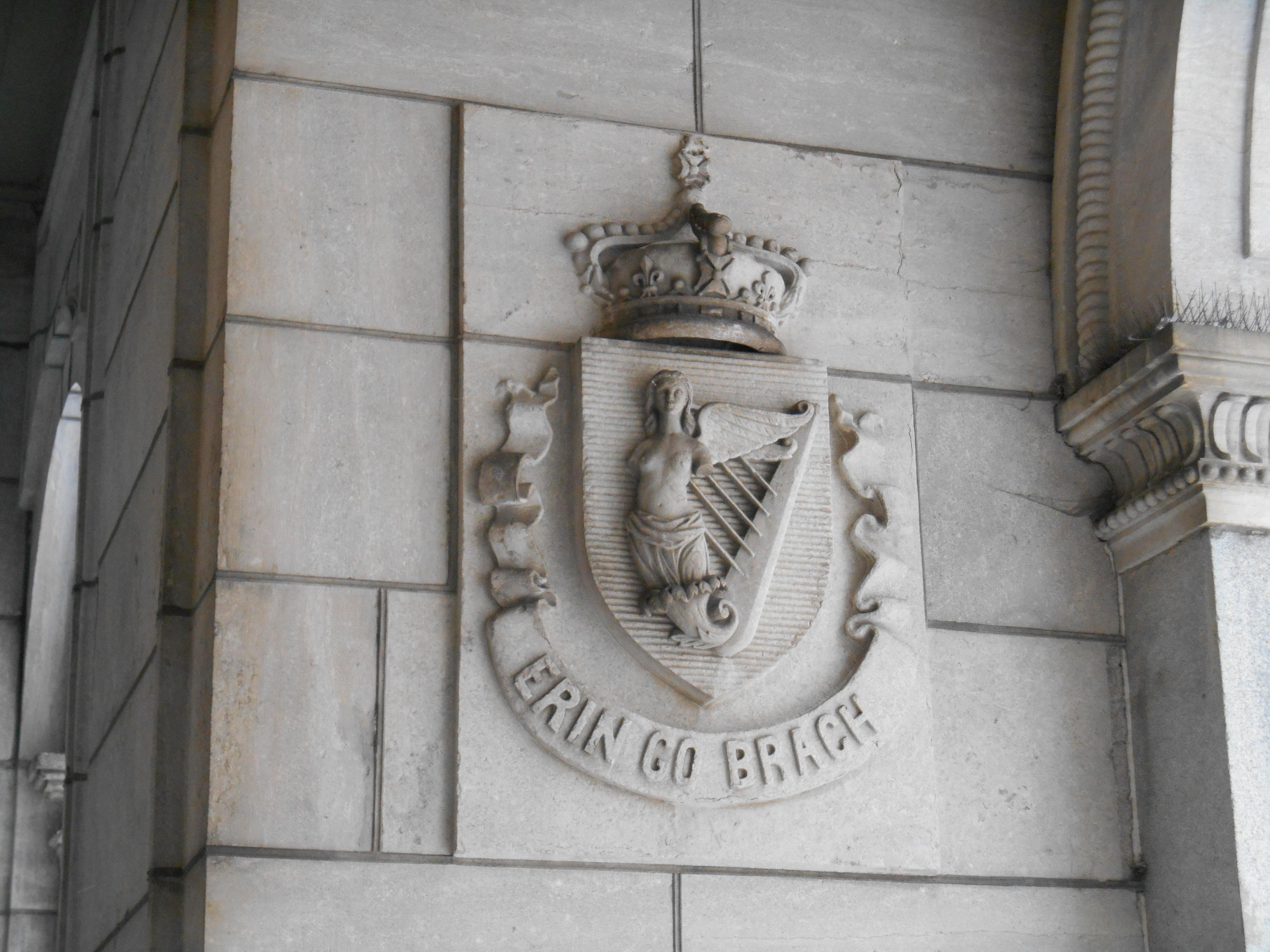
The historic royal badge of Ireland above the motto Erin go Bragh on the 1887 Gérard-D.-Levesque Building in Quebec City

At the height of decades of negotiation regarding home rule in Ireland, in the late 19th century the Irish Unionist Party used the slogan on a banner at one of their conventions, expressing their pride in Irish identity.

=== Sport ===
In the late 19th century, the Edinburgh football club Hibernian F.C. adopted Erin Go Bragh as their motto and it adorned their shirts accordingly. Founded in 1875 by Edinburgh Irishmen and the local Catholic Church, St Patrick's, the club's shirts included a gold harp set on a green background. The flag can still be seen at Hibernian matches to this day.

In 1887, a gaelic games club was set up in Clonsilla, Dublin under the name Erin go Bragh GAA. There is also an "Erin go Bragh GAA" club in Warwickshire, England.

In 1906, three Irishmen went to Athens, Greece, to compete in the 1906 Intercalated Olympics as an Irish team independent of Britain. They had distinct uniforms and intended to compete for the first time as representatives of their own country. Once in Athens, the Irishmen became aware that the British committee had decided that they would instead compete under the British flag. Peter O'Connor won the silver medal for the long jump. As he was about to receive his medal, he rushed to the flagpole, climbed it, and flew the Erin Go Bragh flag, as the Tricolour had not yet gained widespread acceptance. The other Irish athletes and a number of Irish-American athletes fended off security for a few minutes while the flag was flown. It was the first time an Irish flag had been flown at a sporting event.

=== Other uses ===
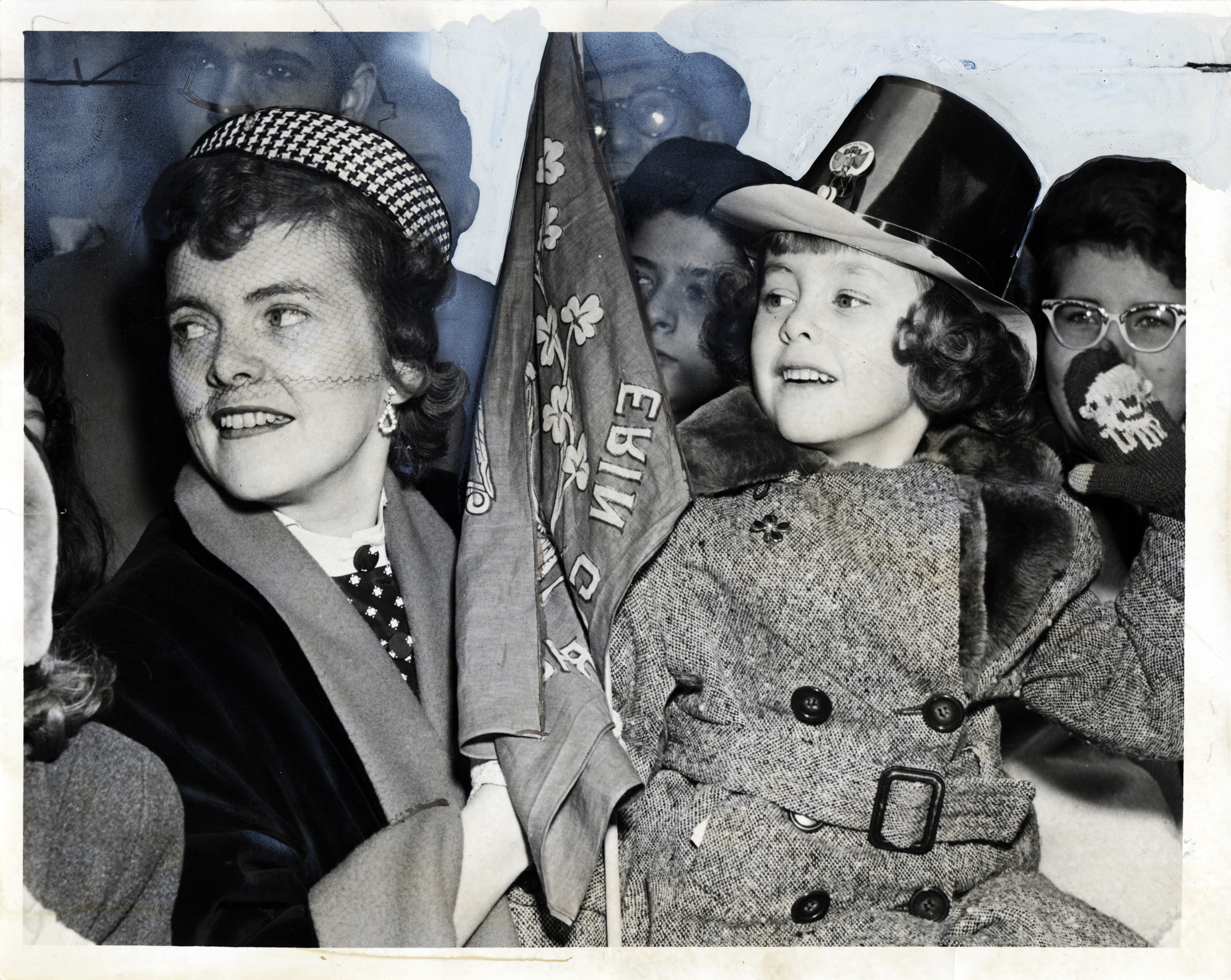
Mother and child with an "Erin Go Bragh" banner during a Saint Patrick's Day Parade in New York, 1951

- A traditional Scottish song from the 19th century entitled "Erin-go-Bragh" tells the story of a Highland Scot who is mistaken for an Irishman. The first two verses are:

My name's Duncan Campbell from the shire of Argyll
I've travelled this country for many's the mile
I've travelled through Ireland, Scotland and a'
And the name I go under's bold Erin-go-bragh

One night in Auld Reekie as I walked down the street
A saucy big polis I chanced for to meet
He glowered in my face and he gi'ed me some jaw
Sayin' "When cam' ye over, bold Erin-go-bragh?"

— 19th Century Scottish song

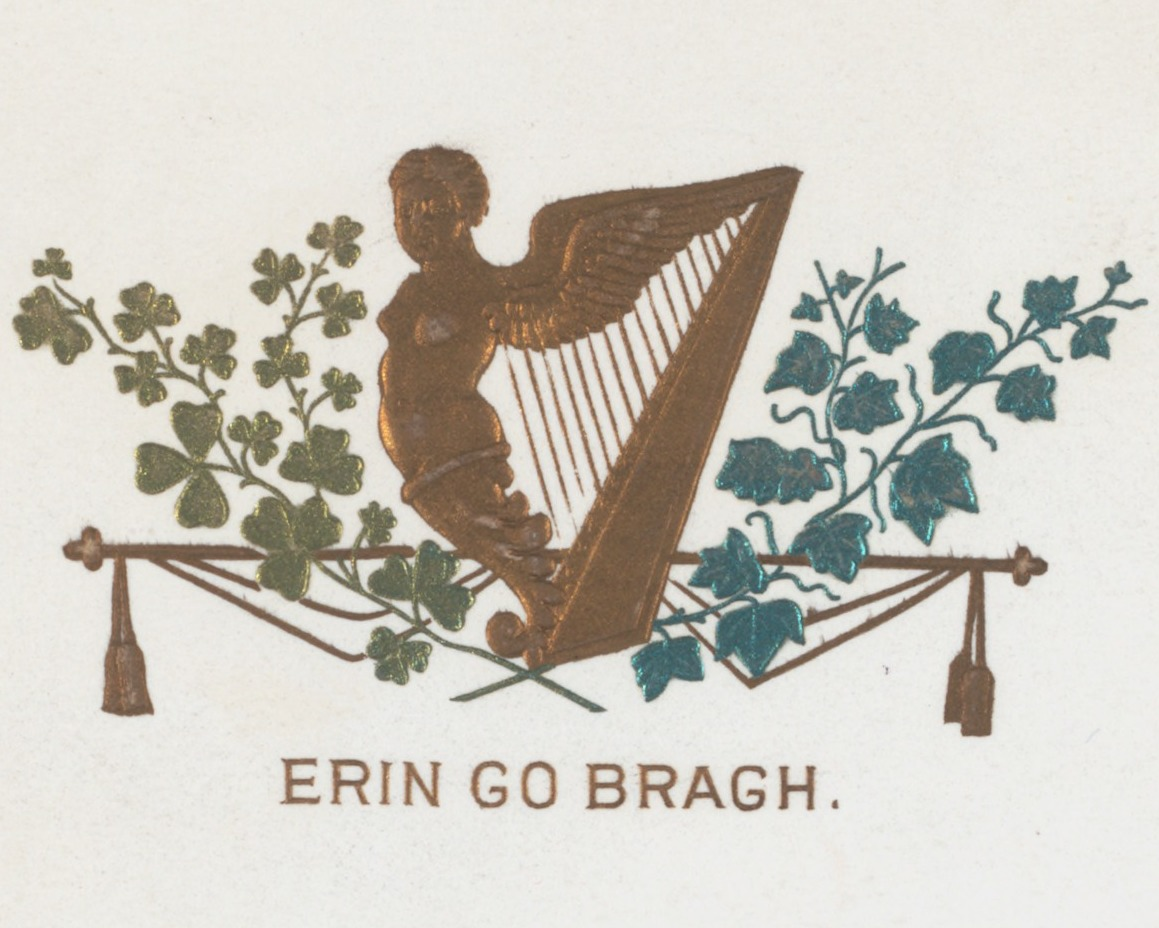
Art from the 106th annual banquet of the Friendly Sons of St. Patrick

Patrick Keohane's sledge flag

- Patrick Keohane, an Irish member of the Terra Nova Expedition in Antarctica from 1910–1913, used a sledge flag consisting of the motto "ERIN GO BRAUGH" beneath a gold harp on a green field, with a Cross of Saint George in the hoist.
- Erin Go Bragh is the motif of the episode The Kidnapped Prime Minister in series two of Agatha Christie's Poirot, originally aired in 1990.
- A version of the traditional Scottish song opens Dick Gaughan's 1981 album Handful of Earth. Andy Irvine and Patrick Street recorded Gaughan's version of the song on their 2007 album On the Fly.
- The expression was paraphrased by a punning New York Times headline Erin go broke, written by economist Paul Krugman, referring to the post-2008 Irish financial crisis.
- In the 2009 film The Boondock Saints II: All Saints Day, Norman Reedus's character Murphy MacManus phrases it as: "It's Irish for, 'you're fucked.'"
- "Erin go Bragh" (1943) is also a rhapsody for brass band, composed by Joan Trimble (1915–2000)
- Peadar Kearney, author of the Irish national anthem, wrote a song entitled 'Erin go Bragh'. The song tells about the Easter Rising in Dublin in sarcastic fashion, with all 6 verses ending in "Erin Go Bragh".
- In 1969, the band The Wolfe Tones released a cover of Kearney's song "Erin Go Bragh" on their LP Rifles of the I.R.A.

== See also ==
- Alba gu bràth (Scottish Gaelic cry: 'Scotland forever!')
- Faugh A Ballagh (Irish: Fág an Bealach "Clear the way!")
- Tiocfaidh ár lá ('Our day will come!')
- Cymru am byth (Welsh cry: 'Wales forever!')
- Breizh da viken or Breizh atao (Breton: 'Brittany forever!')
