= Alba gu bràth =

Scottish Gaelic nationalistic slogan

Alba gu bràth (pronounced [ˈal̪ˠapə kə ˈpɾaːx]) is a Scottish Gaelic phrase used to express allegiance to Scotland (Alba). Idiomatically it translates into English as 'Scotland forever', though the literal meaning is 'Scotland until judgement' referring to the religious idea of a great judgement at the end of time.

The phrase is parallel to the Irish Éirinn go Brách ('Ireland Forever'), Welsh language slogan Cymru am byth ('Wales forever'), the Breton Breizh da viken ('Brittany forever') or the Cornish language Kernow bys vykken ('Cornwall forever').

== Popular culture ==
In the 1995 film Braveheart, Scottish knight William Wallace (portrayed by Mel Gibson) shouts "Alba gu bràth" as he gallops across the front of his assembled Scottish troops just prior to their decisive victory at the Battle of Stirling Bridge.

In 2019 the Alba Gu Bràth tartan was added to the Scottish Register of Tartans.

For the 2024-2025 season, the Scottish Rugby team wore a white & sky blue away jersey with "Alba gu bràth" written on the cuffs.

It has also been used on some Scotland Football National team shirts over the past few seasons.
