= Alba =

Scottish Gaelic name for Scotland

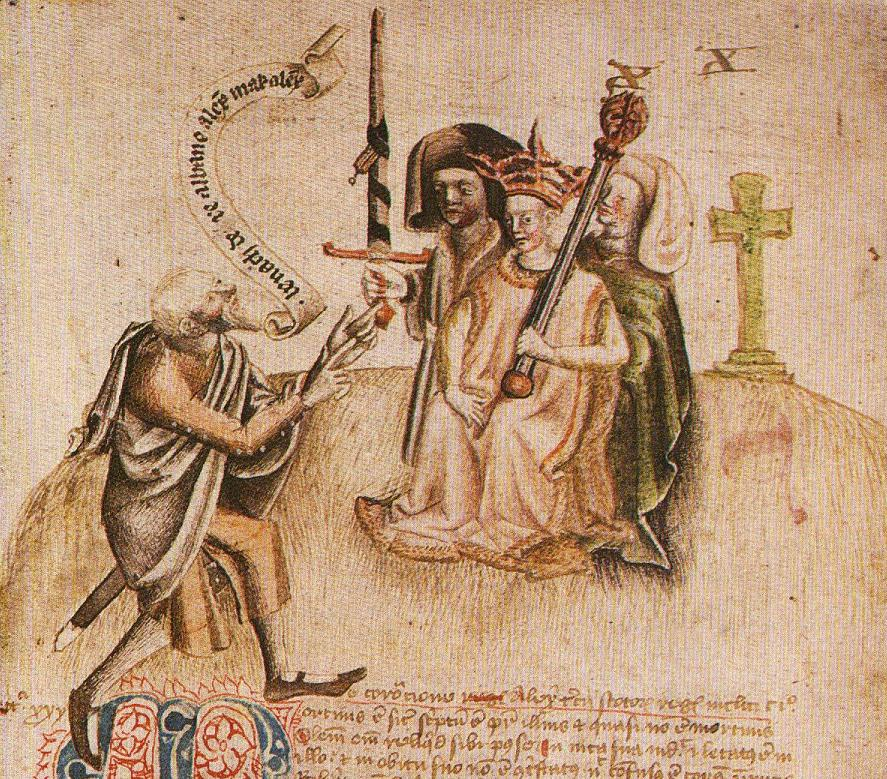
Coronation of King Alexander III on Moot Hill, Scone, on 13 July 1249. He is being greeted by the ollamh rìgh, the royal poet, who is addressing him with the proclamation "Benach De Re Albanne" (= Beannachd do Rìgh Albann, "Blessings to the King of Scotland"); the poet goes on to recite Alexander's genealogy.

Alba (/ˈælbə, ˈælvə/ AL-bə, AL-və, Scottish Gaelic: [ˈal̪ˠəpə]) is the Gaelic name for Scotia. It is also, in English-language historiography, used to refer to the polity of Picts and Scotti united in the ninth century as the Scotia, until it developed into the Kingdom of Scotland of the late Middle Ages following the absorption of Strathclyde and English-speaking Lothian in the 12th century. It is cognate with the Irish term Alba (gen. Alban, dat. Albain) and the Manx Gaelic term Nalbin, the two other Gaelic languagess Insular Celtic languages, as well as contemporary words used in Cornish language (Alban) and Welsh language (Yr Alban), both of which are Brythonic Insular Celtic languages. The third surviving Brythonic language, Breton, instead uses Bro-Skos, meaning 'country of the Scots'. In the past, these terms were names for Great Britain as a whole, related to the Brythonic name Albion.

== Etymology ==
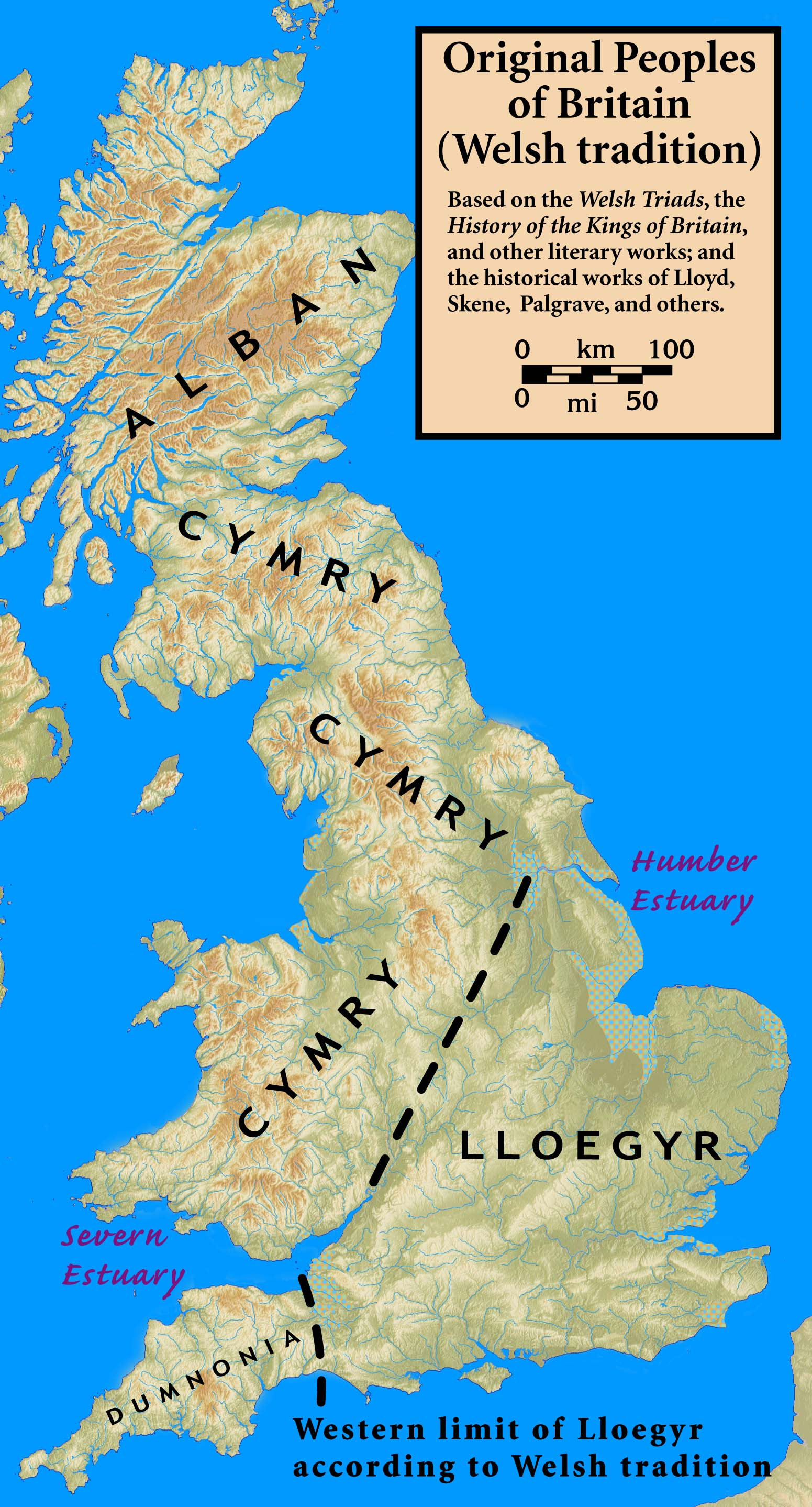
The peoples of Britain

The term first appears in classical texts as Ἀλβίων Albíōn or Ἀλουΐων Alouíōn (in Ptolemy's writings in Greek), and later as Albion in Latin documents. Historically, the term refers to Britain as a whole and is ultimately based on the Indo-European root for "white". It later came to be used by Gaelic speakers in the form of Alba (dative Albainn, genitive Albann, now obsolete) as the name given to the former kingdom of the Picts which, when first used in this sense (around the time of king Causantín mac Áeda (Constantine II, 943–952)), had expanded. The region of Breadalbane (Bràghad Albann, the upper part of "Alba") takes its name from it as well.

As time passed, that kingdom incorporated other territories to its south. It became re-Latinised in the High Medieval period as "Albania" (it is unclear whether it may ultimately share the same etymon as the modern Albania). This latter word was employed mainly by Celto-Latin writers, and most famously by Geoffrey of Monmouth. It was this word which passed into Middle English as Albany, although very rarely was this used for the Kingdom of Scotland, but rather for the notional Duchy of Albany. It is from the latter that Albany, the capital of the US state of New York, and Albany, Western Australia, take their names.

It also appears in the anglicised literary form of Albyn, as in Byron's Childe Harold:

And wild and high the 'Cameron's gathering' rose,

The war-note of Lochiel, which Albyn's hills

Have heard, and heard, too, have her Saxon foes

== Modern uses ==
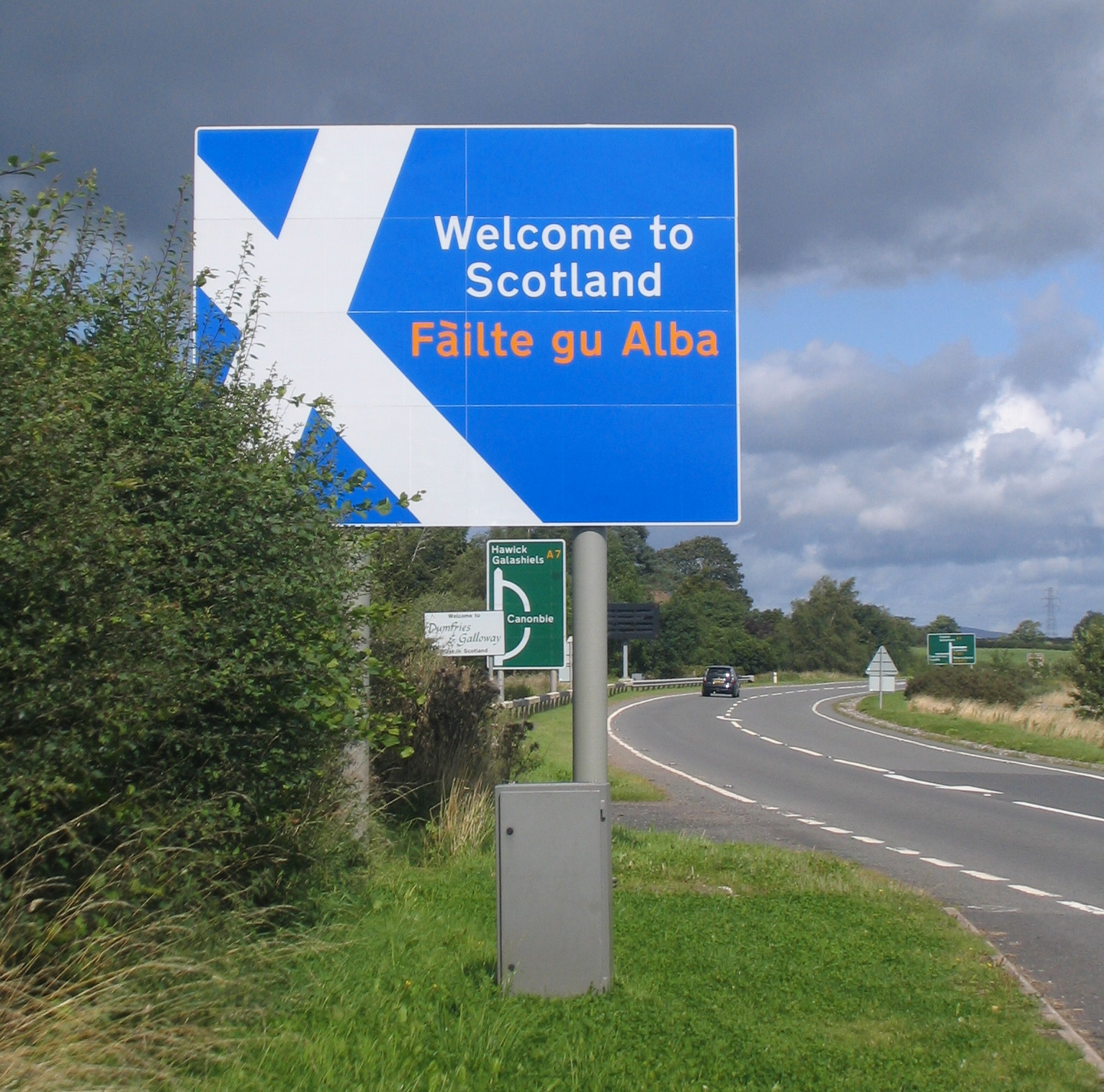
Scotland welcomes arrivals on the A7: Fàilte gu Alba.

BBC Alba, a television channel broadcasting mainly in Scottish Gaelic, was launched in September 2008 as a joint venture between the British Broadcasting Corporation (BBC) and Gaelic company MG Alba. A new version of Runrig's song Alba (originally on their album, The Cutter and the Clan) was featured on the channel's launch.

In the mid-1990s, the Celtic League started a campaign to have the word "Alba" on the Scottish football and rugby tops. Since 2005, the SFA have supported the use of Scottish Gaelic by adding Alba on the back of the official team strip. However, as of 2008, the SRU is still being lobbied to have Alba added to the national rugby union strip.

In 2007, the then Scottish Executive re-branded itself as "The Scottish Government" and started to use a bilingual logo with the Gaelic name Riaghaltas na h-Alba. However, the Gaelic version from the outset had always been Riaghaltas na h-Alba. The Scottish Parliament, likewise, uses the Gaelic name Pàrlamaid na h-Alba.

A new welcome sign on the historic A7 route into Scotland was erected in 2009, with the text Fàilte gu Alba.

Phrases such as Alba gu bràth may be used as a catch-phrase or rallying cry. It was used in the movie Braveheart as William Wallace encouraged the troops at the Battle of Stirling Bridge.

In March 2021, former first minister of Scotland and leader of the SNP Alex Salmond launched the pro-independence Alba Party, set to contest the 2021 Scottish Parliament elections.

== See also ==
- Albanactus
- Caledonia
- Kingdom of Alba
- Scotia
