= Battle of Stracathro =

1130 battle near Brechin, Scotland

Coordinates: 56.741°N 2.655°W

Date	16 April 1130
Location	near Brechin, Angus, Scotland
Result	Scottish Crown victory

Belligerents
Kingdom of Scotland	Kingdom of Moray; Kingdom of Ross

Commanders and leaders
Constable Edward	Angus of Moray †; Malcolm MacAllister

Strength
10,000	5,000

Casualties and losses
1,000+	4,000

The Battle of Stracathro, also known as the Battle of Inchbare, took place on 16 April 1130 about three miles (4.8 km) north of Brechin, Scotland, near the River North Esk.

Óengus of Moray and Máel Coluim mac Alaxandair invaded Scotland with 5,000 warriors according to the Anglo-Norman chronicler Orderic Vitalis. This invasion was launched by the joint forces of Moray and Ross at an opportunistic moment to destabilise David I of Scotland's control as he was visiting England. David had spent most of 1130 in England to serve as a judge at Henry I's court, as well as to attend the dedication service of Canterbury Cathedral.

The rebellion was led by two pretenders to the Scottish crown, Máel Coluim mac Alaxandair (Malcolm)—the illegitimate son of Alexander I of Scotland—and Óengus of Moray (Angus). Angus was the grandson of King Lulach who had been deposed and killed by David's father Malcolm "Canmore". Details of the invasion are sparse in the historical record; however, it is recognised that the aim was to depose David and replace him with Angus—as a legitimate heir.

The forces loyal to David were led by Edward, Constable of Scotland. Edward's army defeated the invading rebellion at Stracathro. Óengus of Moray was killed in the battle. Contemporary reports differ in the scale of the loss of the rebels, with some estimating as many as 4,000 may have been killed but other sources claiming a much smaller battle.

Malcolm, having escaped, took up the mantle as the new pretender to the Scottish crown after the death of Angus. He was later betrayed in 1134 and imprisoned in Roxburgh by David for life.
