= Máel Snechtai =

Ruler of Moray, Scotland (died 1085)

Máel Snechtai mac Lulaich
- Reign: 1058–1085
- Predecessor: Lulach mac Gillai Coemgáin
- Successor: Óengus
- Died: 1085
- House: House of Moray
- Father: Lulach, King of Scotland

Máel Snechtai mac Lulaich (died 1085) was the ruler of Moray, and the son of Lulach, King of Scotland.

He is called on his death notice in the Annals of Ulster, "Máel Snechtai m. Lulaigh ri Muireb" ("Máel Snechtai, Lulach's son, King of Moray"), which is a significant terminological development, since previously the titles for the ruler of Moray had either been "King of Scotland" or "Mormaer." The title is repeated for his successor, Óengus (if indeed the latter were his successor).

Perhaps then the events of Máel Snechtai's death caused some kind of identity disassociation between the Men of Moray and the Men of Scotland. The Anglo-Saxon Chronicle, s.a. 1078, reports that "In this year Máel Coluim seized the mother of Máel Snechtai ...and all his treasures, and his cattle; and he himself escaped [only] with difficulty." The ... represents a lacuna in the text one line long; but it is clear that Máel Snechtai was defeated by King Máel Coluim III in some kind of conflict. Grant's suggestion that Máel Snechtai subsequently retired to a monastery is based only on textual innuendo, and is made unlikely by the fact that he was called "King of Moray" on his death. Máel Snechtai, as the son of King Lulach, undoubtedly perceived himself as the rightful king of Scotland, and the already noted conflict with Máel Coluim III strongly suggests that he pursued his claim.

His death date is based on the year given by the Annals of Ulster, s.a. 1085.

== Sources ==
- Anderson, Alan Orr, Early Sources of Scottish History: AD 500-1286, 2 Vols, (Edinburgh, 1922)
- Anderson, Alan Orr, Scottish Annals from English Chroniclers: AD 500-1286, (London, 1908), republished, Marjorie Anderson (ed.) (Stamford, 1991)
- Grant, Alexander, "The Province of Ross and the Kingdom of Alba", in E.J. Cowan and R.Andrew McDonald (eds.), Alba: Celtic Scotland in the Medieval Era, (Edinburgh, 2000)

Preceded by Lulach mac Gillai Coemgáin	Mormaer of Moray; 1058–1085	Succeeded by Óengus
