= Abernethy and Kincardine =

Coordinates: 57.265278°N 3.658056°W

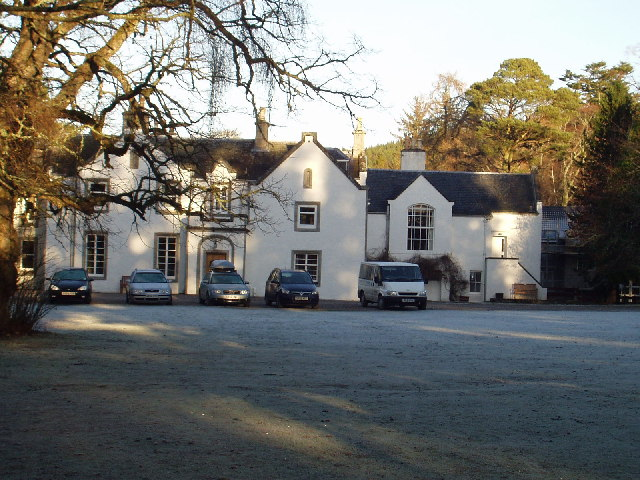
- Abernethy Outdoor Centre, by Nethy Bridge

- Location within the Badenoch and Strathspey area
- Council area: Highland
- Country: Scotland
- Sovereign state: United Kingdom
- Police: Scotland
- Fire: Scottish
- Ambulance: Scottish

Abernethy and Kincardine is a civil parish, and former registration district and ecclesiastical parish, in the Highland council area of Scotland. The name is not in use for any modern administrative entity, but remains as the usual description for historical purposes, in the case of the registration district being only a name change.

The name "Abernethy" is derived from the local River Nethy ("aber" is Pictish for a river mouth or junction). The name Kincardine is of mixed Gaelic and Pictish origin, "ceann" being Scots Gaelic for head and "cardden" the Brythonic/Pictish for a wooded area; the latter element also features as "garten" in other nearby placenames.

The current main village, Bridge of Nethy, now more well known as Nethy Bridge was located around the confluence of the River Nethy and the Duack Burn, at grid reference NJ001206; its earlier growth was mostly upriver along the banks of the Nethy.

== The Ecclesiastical Parish ==
The Church of Scotland parish was created in the 16th century by the combination of the parishes of Kincardine and Abernethy, both of which have ancient origins and past or later associations with other churches. Both parish churches (and associated burial grounds) remain in use.

The baptism registers (up to 1856, since deposited with the Registrar General with microfilm copies at a number of places) have poor coverage around the 1820s, apart from those events not recorded if the parishioners were members of other churches. The pre-1855 marriage registers are in a similar condition but also contain some "extra" entries concerning parishioners who married in other parishes or denominations, including some Roman Catholic marriages (indicated as "married by a priest").

Changes in modern church-going habits have led to Church of Scotland ministers usually covering more than one of the original parishes, in this case resulting in the once "United Parish" of Abernethy and Kincardine becoming separated again and the parts joined to neighbouring parishes; the 2006 circuits for the area are now advertised as "Abernethy, Cromdale and Advie" and "Boat of Garten and Kincardine with Duthil Carrbridge".

=== Abernethy Kirk ===
This church is on the West side of the Nethy Bridge to Grantown-on-Spey road, beside the ruins of Castle Roy. The burial ground has been extended in recent years and is in current use for new lairs. Most pre-1855 inscriptions have been recorded and published A rough-surfaced roadside parking area with space for a number of vehicles gives level access to the church and also serves Castle Roy (to which casual pedestrian access is officially not recommended for safety reasons).

=== Kincardine Kirk ===
This church is on a small knoll set back from the road between Auchgourish and West Croftmore. It is somewhat smaller than Abernethy Kirk and few new lairs have been created in recent years but burials still take place in existing lairs. Most pre-1855 grave inscriptions have been recorded and published. The churchyard contains a very old Yew tree as often found where such a site has pre-Christian associations. There is usually room for two or three vehicles to park on a grassed area beside the churchyard gate; the lane leading to the church is gated to protect animals in the adjacent fields but not locked.

== The Civil Parish and Registration District ==
The civil parish (based on the boundary of the ecclesiastical parish) originally straddled parts of Inverness-shire and Morayshire; county boundary changes in the latter half of the 19th century resulted in the entire parish being contained within Inverness-shire. The parish council has since been abolished.

It remained as a registration district (since 1972 renamed as Nethybridge) until 2001, generally matching the 19th century census district; from 2002 it became part of the Grantown on Spey and Nethybridge registration district. Due to a combination of registration district boundaries not being tied to local authority boundaries and later changes of the county boundary, events will be found described as happening in Invernessshire or (until 1862) Morayshire but (barring any confusion with the Perthshire town of Abernethy) the same address within this parish is usually being referred to if only the county varies. The Glenmore area (at the southern end of the parish) was moved to the Rothiemurchus registration district on 1 October 1956 thus transferring some places which would have been recorded as being within Kincardine in this parish and still might be so described in some more recent registrations.

== People ==
- Colonel John Roy Stewart (1700–1752), war poet in English and Scottish Gaelic, military officer, covert operative, and Jacobite.
- Duncan Phyfe (1770-1854), United States most celebrated cabinetmaker.
- Rev. William Forsyth (1825–1907), parish minister and author of In the Shadow of Cairngorm; his book is now out of copyright and online copies other than those listed below can usually be found.
- Thomas King, Police Constable, was killed by Allan McCallum, a local poacher, when he and a Constable MacNiven attempted to execute an arrest warrant on 20 December 1898. Allan McCallum was tried in Inverness for murder in February 1899, but found guilty of culpable homicide and sentenced to 15 years imprisonment; he was released in 1910. Constable King is buried at Abernethy Kirk.
