= Óengus of Moray =

Last king of Moray

Óengus of Moray (Oenghus mac inghine Lulaich, ri Moréb) was the last king of Moray of the native line, ruling Moray in what is now northeastern Scotland from an unknown date until his death in 1130.

Óengus is known to have been the son of the daughter of King Lulach of Scotland. This was perhaps how he attained the kingship of the Men of Moray. Óengus' last known predecessor was his uncle, Máel Snechtai (d. 1085). If Óengus ruled during this whole period, then he would have been the one who incurred the wrath of King Alexander I when the Moravians (people of Moray) murdered Ladhmunn, his nephew and son of Domnall, the son of King Malcolm III by Ingibjorg.

Orderic Vitalis wrote that in the year 1130, Óengus with Máel Coluim mac Alaxandair invaded Gaelic Scotia with 5000 warriors. The Moravians were met by King David's general, an old Anglo-Saxon noble named Edward Siwardsson, causing the Battle of Stracathro. The Anglo-Saxon Chronicle reported "a great slaughter" . The Annals of Ulster tells that 4000 Moravians were killed, and only 1000 Gaels. The Annals of Innisfallen makes clear that what Orderic Vitalis wrote regarding the battle having taken place in Scotia indicates that it was an invasion. Edward defeated the Moravians and Óengus was killed. The Scoti then invaded Moray, which, as Orderic Vitalis put it, "lacked a defender and lord."

After Óengus' defeat, Moray was probably granted to William fitz Duncan. After his death in 1147, it was to some extent colonized by King David's French, Flemish and English followers, although in the longer term, most of these became Gaelicized.

== Bibliography ==
- Anderson, Alan Orr, Early Sources of Scottish History: AD 500-1286, 2 Vols, (Edinburgh, 1922)
- Anderson, Alan Orr, Scottish Annals from English Chroniclers: AD 500-1286, (London, 1908), republished, Marjorie Anderson (ed.) (Stamford, 1991)
- Roberts, John L., Lost Kingdoms: Celtic Scotland in the Middle Ages, (Edinburgh, 1997)

Preceded by ?Máel Snechtai mac Lulaich	Mormaer of Moray ?-1130	Succeeded by Annexed to Scotland; given to Uilleam mac Donnchada
