= Somerled =

- Somerled's name as it appears on folio 35v. of British Library MS Cotton Julius A VII (the Chronicles of Mann): "Sumeledo".

King of the Isles
- Reign: c. 1158–1164
- Died: 1164; Battle of Renfrew
- Burial: probably Iona
- Consort: Princess Ragnhildis Olafsdottir of Man
- Issue: GilleBride, Dubgall, Ragnall, Aonghas, Olaf, Bethóc
- Father: GilleBride

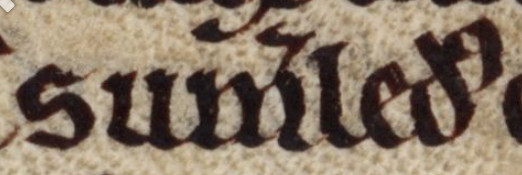
Sumerledus with scribal abbreviations (Cambridge Corpus Christi College 139, folio ar)

Somerled (died 1164), known in Middle Irish as Somairle, Somhairle, and Somhairlidh, and in Old Norse as Sumarliði [ˈsumɑrˌliðe], was a mid-12th-century Norse-Gaelic lord who, through marital alliance and military conquest, rose in prominence to create the Kingdom of Argyll and the Isles. Little is certain of Somerled's origins, although he may have been born in the north of Ireland and appears to have belonged to a Norse–Gaelic family of some prominence. His father, GilleBride, of royal Irish ancestry, appears to have conducted a marriage alliance with Máel Coluim mac Alaxandair, son of Alexander I of Scotland, and claimant to the Scottish throne. During a period of alliance with David I of Scotland, Somerled married Ragnhild, daughter of Óláfr Guðrøðarson, King of Man and the Isles in 1140. In 1153, Olaf of Man died and was succeeded by his son, Godred. But Godred Olafsson was a very unpopular ruler. Somerled was asked by Thorfinn Ottarson, a Manx chief, to allow Somerled's son, Dugall, to be appointed king of Man and the Isles. Somerled agreed and with 80 ships confronted Godred off the coast of Islay on January 5–6, 1156. After the sea battle, Somerled and Godred divided the Kingdom of Man and the Isles between them but Godred did not accept Dugall as King of Man. Accordingly, two years later, Somerled defeated and drove Godred from power. Dugall continued as King of Man and Somerled thus ruled the entire kingdom of Argyll, Man and the Isles until his death.

Somerled was slain in 1164 at the Battle of Renfrew, amidst an invasion of mainland Scotland, commanding forces drawn from all over his kingdom. The reasons for his attack are unknown. He may have wished to nullify Scottish encroachment, but the scale of his venture suggests that he nursed greater ambitions. On his death, Somerled's vast kingdom disintegrated, although his sons retained much of the southern Hebridean portion. Compared to his immediate descendants, who associated themselves with reformed religious orders, Somerled may have been something of a religious traditionalist. In the last year of his life, he attempted to persuade the head of the Columban monastic community, Flaithbertach Ua Brolcháin, Abbot of Derry, to relocate from Ireland to Iona, a sacred island within Somerled's sphere of influence. Unfortunately for Somerled, his demise denied him the ecclesiastical reunification he sought, and decades later his descendants oversaw the obliteration of the island's Columban monastery. Iona's oldest surviving building, St Oran's Chapel, dates to the mid-12th century, and may have been built by Somerled or his family.

Traditionally considered a Celtic hero, who vanquished Viking foes and fostered a Gaelic renaissance, contemporary sources reveal that while Somerled considered himself the leader of the Gaels of what was once old Dalriada, he operated in, and belonged to, the same Norse-Gaelic cultural environment as his maritime neighbours. By the time he took as his wife Ragnhild, daughter of Olafr Godredsson, King of the Isles, a member of the Crovan dynasty, Somerled was already Lord of Argyll, Kintyre and Lorne. Through Ragnhild and his descendants, he claimed the Kingdom of Man and the Isles. A later medieval successor to this kingdom, the Lordship of the Isles, was ruled by Somerled's descendants until the late 15th century.

Regarded as a significant figure in 12th-century Scottish, Gaelic and Manx history, Somerled is proudly proclaimed as a patrilineal ancestor by several Scottish clans. Recent genetic studies suggest that Somerled has hundreds of thousands of patrilineal descendants and that his patrilineal origins lie in Norway rather than Ireland.

== Sources ==
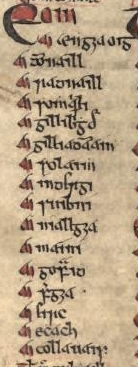
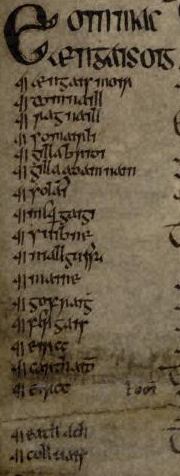
The late fourteenth- and early fifteenth-century Book of Ballymote (left) and Great Book of Lecan (right) contain versions of Somerled's traditional pedigree. (Note: These particular pedigrees concern Somerled's great-great-great grandson, John MacDonald, Lord of the Isles (d. 1387), and trace his lineage back to Colla Uais.)

Somerled's career is patchily documented in four main contemporary sources: the Chronicle of Holyrood, the Chronicle of Melrose, the Chronicles of Mann, and the Carmen de Morte Sumerledi. The chronicles of Holyrood and Melrose were originally compiled in the late 12th century. As products of Scottish reformed monasteries, these sources tend to be sympathetic to the cause of the Scottish kings descended from Malcolm III of Scotland. The Chronicle of Mann was first compiled in the mid-13th century, and concerns itself with the history of the Crovan dynasty, a rival kindred of Somerled and his descendants. For similar reasons, the aforementioned sources and the Carmen de Morte Sumerledi, a late 12th-century Latin poem by a Scottish cleric who witnessed Somerled's final invasion against the Scots, are partisan accounts slanted against Somerled. Various Irish annals are also useful sources of information, although they usually only corroborate what is documented in other sources. Later clan histories, such as the early modern History of the MacDonalds and the Books of Clanranald, although unreliable as historical narratives, contain a considerable amount of detailed information. The late provenance and partisan nature of these histories means that their uncorroborated claims, particularly those concerning early figures such as Somerled and his contemporaries, need to be treated with caution. Another relevant source is a particular charter, issued by Malcolm IV, King of Scotland (d. 1165) in 1160, that briefly notes Somerled in its dating clause.

== Origins ==
Somerled's origins are masked in obscurity and myth. Although no contemporary pedigree exists that outlines his ancestry, there are over a dozen later medieval, early modern, and modern sources that purport to outline Somerled's patrilineal descent. The names that these sources give for his father (GilleBride) and paternal grandfather (GilleAdamnan) appear to be corroborated in patronymic forms recorded in the Annals of Tigernach and the Annals of Ulster. (Note: The record in the latter source may refer to a lineal ancestor, rather than an actual father. The historicity of GilleBride is further corroborated by the 17th and 18th century accounts of an inscription on the gravestone of Somerled's daughter.) The names in preceding generations, however, become more unusual, and the more authoritative sources begin to contradict each other. In consequence, two or three generations may be the furthest that Somerled's patrilineal lineage can be traced with any degree of accuracy. (Note: Many of the sources trace Somerled's lineage to Fergus Mór, a legendary king of Dál Riata; and more trace Somerled's line further back to Colla Uais, a legendary Irish king. With the exception of these figures, and other somewhat legendary figures who are listed as Somerled's earliest ancestors, the historicity of the other men in the traditional lineage beyond his grandfather cannot be corroborated. Solam appears as Somerled's great-grandfather in the more authoritative sources, which suggests that his placement may well be accurate. Solam's name is rather unusual, although not unattested for other individuals in other sources; as such, its occurrence in Somerled's traditional lineage could be evidence of its accuracy.) Somerled was almost certainly of Norse–Gaelic ancestry, and nothing is known of his early life. The History of the MacDonalds and the Book of Clanranald relate that his immediate ancestors were prominent in Argyll before being unjustly ejected by Scandinavians and Scots. Although these specific claims concerning his ancestors cannot be corroborated, Somerled's eventual marriage to a daughter of a reigning King of the Isles, and the marriage of one of the former's immediate kinswomen to the son of a King of Scotland, suggests that Somerled belonged to a family of considerable status.

== Kinship with the Scottish royal house ==
The precise identity of Somerled's aforementioned kinswoman is uncertain. The following pedigrees illustrate three possible ways in which her marriage bound Somerled's family with a senior branch of the Scottish dynasty. According to the Chronicle of Holyrood, the sons of Máel Coluim mac Alaxandair (fl. 1134), son of Alexander I of Scotland (d. 1124), were Somerled's "nepotes". This Latin term could be evidence that the mother of Malcolm's sons was either a sister, or a daughter of Somerled; or Somerled and Malcolm were maternal half-brothers.

1. The sons of Malcolm as maternal nephews of Somerled, descended from the latter's sister.

Malcolm III
GilleBride	Alexander I	David I
Somerled	unnamed	Máel Coluim	Henry
sons	Malcolm IV

2. The sons of Malcolm as maternal grandsons of Somerled, descended from the latter's daughter.

GilleBride	Malcolm III
Somerled	Alexander I	David I
unnamed	Malcolm	Henry
sons	Malcolm IV

3. The sons of Malcolm as maternal half-nephews of Somerled, descended from the latter's mother.

Malcolm III
GilleBride	unnamed	Alexander I	David I
Somerled	Malcolm	Henry
sons	Malcolm IV

== Emergence ==
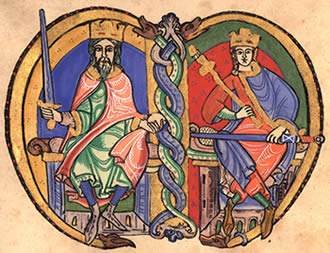
Mid-12th-century depiction of David I, and his grandson, Malcolm IV. Earlier that century, Somerled's family appears to have bound itself in marriage to an opposing branch of the Scottish royal house.

Somerled's first appearance in contemporary sources occurs in 1153. (Note: A misplaced entry in the Annals of the Four Masters places Somerled's death in 1083, about 81 years too early. This entry has led some historians to state that Somerled's father, GilleBride, was the son of GilleAdamnan, the son of another GilleBride, the son of another GilleAdamnan.) In May of that year, the reigning David I, King of Scotland died, and was succeeded by his twelve-year-old grandson, Malcolm IV, son of Henry, Earl of Northumberland (d. 1152). Less than six months later Somerled emerges into recorded history: the Chronicle of Holyrood states that he rose in rebellion that November, allied with his aforementioned nepotes, against the recently inaugurated king. A further account of this rising may also be preserved in the Carmen de Morte Sumerledi, which recounts Somerled's devastating sack of Glasgow, its cathedral, and surrounding countryside. As noted above, the father of Somerled's nepotes was Malcolm, illegitimate son of Alexander. As a son of David's elder brother and royal predecessor, this Malcolm represented a lineally senior branch of the Scottish royal house. Succession by primogeniture was not an established custom in 12th-century Scotland, and surviving sources reveal that Alexander's heirs received substantial support for their claims to the throne. The remarkable haste with which Malcolm IV succeeded his grandfather further exemplifies the perceived risk that David's line faced from rival royal claimants. (Note: The exact date when David was buried is uncertain. However, the chronology preserved by lists of Scottish kings suggests that Malcolm IV was inaugurated only three days after David's death—too short a time for the latter's body to have been conveyed from Carlisle to Dunfermline Abbey, a journey of almost 150 miles (240 km).) Kinship with the sons of Malcolm, members of the royal derbfine, gave Somerled a serious stake in the contested royal succession, and his participation in the insurrection of 1153 was likely undertaken in this context. (Note: The regular misidentification of this Malcolm with Malcolm MacHeth has plagued historians until recently. In Gaelic society, a derbfine was a kin-group of men patrilineally descended from a common ancestor in four generations. Members of a royal derbfine appear to have been potential royal candidates, although the precise prerequisites for eligibility for kingship are uncertain.)

Contemporary sources reveal that, during the first third of the 12th century, Malcolm and David had bitterly struggled for control of the Scottish kingdom, before Malcolm was finally captured and imprisoned in 1134. The chronology of Malcolm's capture, and the rising of his sons in league with Somerled, suggests that an alliance between Malcolm and Somerled's family may date from prior to his capture, possibly in about the 1120s. Surviving charter evidence reveals that, on at least two occasions before about 1134, David temporarily based himself at Irvine in Cunningham, a strategic coastal site from where Scottish forces may have conducted seaborne military operations against Malcolm's western allies. Aelred of Rievaulx's Relatio de Standardo reveals that David received English military assistance against Malcolm. This source specifies that a force against Malcolm was mustered at Carlisle, and notes successful naval campaigns conducted against David's enemies, which suggests that Malcolm's support was indeed centred in Scotland's western coastal periphery. By the mid 1130s, David had not only succeeded in securing Malcolm, but also appears to have gained recognition of his overlordship of Argyll.

Evidence that Somerled or his father acknowledged David's dominance may exist in the capture of Malcolm itself, as Ailred's Relatio de Standardo indicates that treachery contributed to Malcolm's downfall. Furthermore, this chronicle reveals that men from the Isles and Lorne or Argyll formed part of the Scottish army at the Battle of the Standard, when David was defeated by the English, near Northallerton in 1138. This could also indicate that Somerled himself campaigned in David's service; on the other hand, it could be evidence that Somerled merely provided mercenary forces for the Scots. There may be further evidence that David regarded himself as overlord of Argyll. One charter, dating to between 1141 and 1147, records that David granted Holyrood Abbey half the teind of his portion of "cain" (see below) from Kintyre and Argyll. This particular charter is the earliest Scottish administrative document concerning Argyll. The word "cain" is ultimately derived from the Gaelic cáin, and refers to a payment (although not every payment) of tribute due to a lord. It appears to concern a regular payment of produce or foodstuffs, raised not only from a lord's personal possessions, but also from more remote regions that acknowledged his overlordship. Cain should not be confused with conveth or wayting, the rights of a lord to hospitality for himself and his retinue. Another charter, dating from between 1145 and 1153, records that he granted Urquhart Priory the teind of his portion of cain from Argyll, and his pleas and revenues from there. A later charter, dating from between 1150 and 1152, records that David granted the other half the teind of his cain from Argyll and Kintyre to Dunfermline Abbey. This latter charter includes the caveat "in whatever year I should receive it", which may suggest that whatever control David had exerted in Argyll at the time of the first charter had eroded by the time of the latter. Thus, Somerled's rise to power may have taken place sometime between 1141 and 1152. Although David may well have regarded Argyll as a Scottish tributary, the ensuing career of Somerled clearly reveals that the latter regarded himself a fully independent ruler.

One consequence of David's westward consolidation appears to have been a series of marital alliances conducted by the rulers of Argyll, Galloway, and the Isles. By about 1140, not only had Somerled married Ragnhild, illegitimate daughter of Olafr Godredsson, King of the Isles (d. 1153), but Olafr was wed to a daughter of Fergus, Lord of Galloway (d. 1161). Olaf himself appears to have enjoyed amicable relations with Stephen, Count of Boulogne and Mortain (d. 1154), which may indicate that Olafr supported Stephen as King of England after 1135. The marital binding of Olafr with dependants of David roughly coincided with the latter's endeavour to establish control of Cumbria after 1138, and may have formed part of a Scottish strategy to isolate Olafr from an English alliance, to project Scottish authority into the Irish Sea, and to draw Olafr into David's sphere of influence. Although support from the rulers of Galloway and Scotland may well have strengthened Olaf's position in the Isles, and the Chronicle of Mann portrays his reign as one of peace, other sources vaguely refer to mainland depredations wrought by Wimund, Bishop of the Isles (fl. c. 1130–c. 1150). The bloodshed attributed to the latter, a shadowy figure who appears to have violently sought the inheritance of the Mormaer of Moray in the late 1140s, suggests that Olafr may have struggled to maintain authority throughout his expansive island-kingdom. Olafr sent his son, Godred Olafsson, to Norway in 1152, where he rendered homage to Inge I of Norway; this could be evidence that there was anxiety over the succession to the kingship of the Isles. The following year, only weeks after David's death, Olafr was assassinated by the Dublin-based sons of his brother. Although Godred was able to return, avenge the murder of his father, and succeed to the kingship, the events of 1153 appear to have destabilised the entire region. The after-effects saw Godred, Fergus, and likely Somerled himself, involve themselves in conflicts in Ireland.

== Conquest of the Isles ==
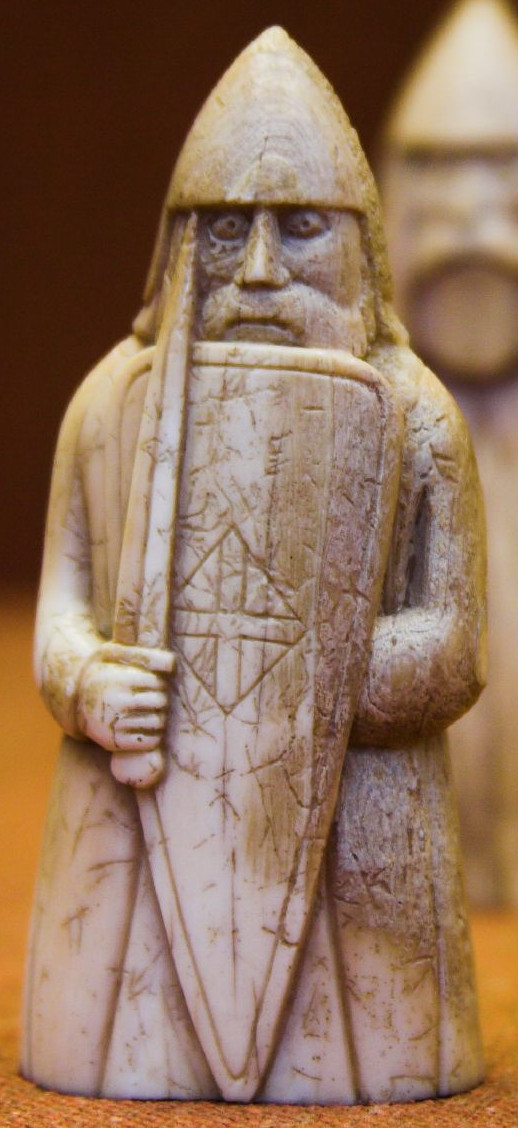
Lewis chess piece depicting the armament of a Norse warrior roughly contemporaneous to Somerled. (Note: The Lewis chessmen consist of pieces from at least four different sets. They were likely crafted in Norway in the 12th and 13th centuries, and were found in the early 19th century in a hoard on Lewis. Although the hoard appears to have been deposited in the early 13th century, some of the pieces may have arrived in the Isles as a result of Godred's journey to Norway in 1152, possibly as a gift between kings, or from the Archbishop of Nidaros to the Bishop of the Isles. The pictured piece, likely a warder, is armed with sword, helmet, and kite shield.)

In 1154, war broke out in Ireland between Muirchertach Mac Lochlainn, King of Cenél nEógain (d. 1166) and Toirdelbach Ua Conchobair, King of Connacht (d. 1156), as the two rivals renewed their struggle for domination over the island. In one particular clash, recorded in the Annals of the Four Masters, a savage sea-battle was fought near Inishowen, where Toirdelbach's forces encountered Muirchertach's mercenary fleet, mustered from Galloway, Arran, Kintyre, Mann, and "the shores of Scotland" (which possibly refers to Argyll and the Hebrides). The ensuing conflict saw Toirdelbach's Connachtmen crush Muirchertach's mercenaries, and the losses suffered by the forces supplied by Godred appear to have undermined the latter's authority in the Isles. Possibly about two years later, although the chronology of events within the relevant sources is unclear, Godred appears to have suffered another setback, when he unsuccessfully attempted to secure control of the Kingdom of Dublin. (Note: The chronology within the Chronicle of Mann is notoriously suspect in places. This source places Godred's dealings in Dublin in the third year of his reign. Irish sources may well corroborate the chronicle's account, although they appear to date the Dublin episode to 1162. For further information, see the following Wikipedia article: Godred Olafsson § King of Dublin?.) In 1156, Malcolm's son, Donald, was captured and imprisoned by the Scots. With this event likely marking the collapse of the insurrection of his nepotes, Somerled appears to have abandoned their cause, and shifted his focus towards the deteriorating situation in the Isles, where disaffected elements appear to have taken root against not only Godred's rule, but also Muirchertach's influence in the region.

In the same year, Somerled is recorded to have participated in a coup d'état against his brother-in-law, as the Chronicle of Mann relates that, Thorfinn Ottarsson, one of the leading men of the Isles, produced Somerled's son Dugald (d. after 1175), as a replacement to Godred's rule. As a grandson of Olaf, and the son of a man with the enterprise and power to confront Muirchertach, Dugald was evidently favoured by a significant number of leading Islesmen, disillusioned with Godred's rule; Somerled, therefore, appears to have taken full advantage of the situation to secure his eldest son a share in the kingdom. Somerled's stratagem does not appear to have received unanimous support, since the chronicle relates that, as Dugald was conducted throughout the Isles, the leading Islesmen were made to render pledges and surrender hostages to him. Following an inconclusive but bloody sea-battle, possibly fought off Mann the following January, the chronicle records that Somerled and Godred divided the kingdom between themselves. (Note: The Chronicle of Mann dates this conflict to the night of the Epiphany. The battle has been variously interpreted to have been fought in either January 1156, or January 1157. The chronology presented in the article follows that latter interpretation. Whatever the year, the weather conditions must have been particularly good to permit a naval battle in January.) According to the History of the MacDonalds, Somerled had previously aided Godred's father in military operations (otherwise unrecorded in contemporary sources) against the "ancient Danes north of Ardnamurchan". (Note: In the Book of Clanranald, the term "Danes" loosely refers to Scandinavians.) Together with its claim that Olaf had also campaigned on North Uist, this source may be evidence that the partitioning of the Isles between Godred and Somerled can be viewed in the context of Somerled taking back territories that he had helped secure into Olaf's kingdom. There is reason to suspect that portions of the Isles had previously fallen under the influence of the Earls of Orkney, before being reclaimed by the Kings of Isles during this period.

At about the time of the partitioning of the Isles, Malcolm IV was reconciled with Malcolm MacHeth (d. 1168), and restored the latter as Earl of Ross, an investiture which may have been a consequence of Somerled's threatening territorial expansion. After the partition, Somerled and Godred appear to have agreed to a truce. However, about two years later in 1158, the chronicle records that Somerled launched a second assault upon Godred, and drove him from the kingdom altogether. From this date until his death, Somerled ruled the entire Kingdom of the Isles, and may well have exerted some degree of influence in Galloway. The Chronicle of Melrose and the Chronicle of Holyrood record that Malcolm IV launched military operations in Galloway in about 1160, with the latter chronicle specifying that the king subdued his "confederate enemies". The exact identity of these enemies is unknown, but the chronicles may document a Scottish victory over an alliance between Somerled and Fergus. (Note: There is reason to suspect that Fergus and Somerled may have been related, possibly as close as brothers or cousins. The name of Somerled's father and his (possibly) eldest son was GilleBride, whilst Fergus' (possibly) eldest son appears to have borne this name as well. If Somerled and Fergus were indeed related, Fergus' rise to power in Galloway may have taken place in the context of David's successful military actions against Malcolm's western allies; which may have marginalised Somerled's family. The Roman de Fergus, a medieval Arthurian romance largely set in southern Scotland, tells the tale of a knight who may represent Fergus himself. The name of the knight's father in this source is a form of the name Somerled, which has led to the supposition that this was also the name of Fergus' father. On the other hand, this character's name may suggest that he instead represents Somerled himself, rather than Fergus' father. Whatever the case, the character has no special role in the romance.) Before the end of the year, Fergus had retired to Holyrood Abbey, and a charter records that Somerled had come into the king's peace. The precise occasion on which Somerled was reconciled with Malcolm IV may have been the king's Christmas feast, held at Perth in that year. This occasion may well have been the origin of the epithet "sit-by-the-king", accorded to Somerled in the Carmen de Morte Sumerledi. Although the concordat between Malcolm IV and Somerled may have taken place after the Scottish king's subjugation of Somerled and Fergus, another possibility is that the agreement was concluded after Somerled had aided the Scots in their overthrow of Fergus.

== Rule and ecclesiastical patronage ==
The Latin title "regulo Herergaidel" ("Lord of Argyll") accorded to Somerled in the Chronicle of Mann, in an entry concerning his marriage to Ragnhild. (Note: In an entry outlining Somerled's final foray of 1164, years after he had acquired the kingship of the Isles, the Chronicle of Melrose styles Somerled in Latin "regulus Eregeithel". The Latin regulus is also a title accorded to Fergus, and appears to betray a biased outlook from contemporary Scottish sources. The authors of these sources may well have wished to downplay the regal status of these peripheral rulers.)

According to the Chronicle of Mann, Somerled and Ragnhild had four sons: Dugald (fl. 1175), Ranald (fl. 1192), Angus (d. 1210), and Olaf. The Chronicle of Mann, Orkneyinga saga, and later tradition preserved in the 18th-century Books of Clanranald, reveal that the claim of Somerled and his descendants to the kingship in the Isles rested upon Ragnhild's descent from the Crovan dynasty. The founder of this Norse-Gaelic kindred was Ragnhild's paternal grandfather, Godred Crovan, King of Dublin and the Isles (d. 1095). (Note: Godred Crovan's place at the apex of the two dynasties who contested the kingship of the Isles in the 12th and 13th centuries suggests that he is the same Godred proclaimed as a significant ancestor in two 13th-century poems concerning descendants of Somerled. As such, Godred Crovan may be the basis of Godfrey MacFergus, a genealogical figure who appears in later sources outlining Somerled's patrilineal ancestry.) Although no acta from Somerled's reign survive, he would have likely been styled in Latin rex insularum (king of the Isles), a charter style borne by one of his descendants (Ranald). This style appears to have been derived from the same title borne by the Crovan dynasty, and was a precursor to the Latin dominus insularum (Lord of the Isles), a title borne by several of Somerled's and Ragnhild's later descendants. The Latin rex insularum was a translation of the Gaelic rí Innse Gall, a title accorded to Kings of the Isles since the late 10th century. A record illustrating the zenith of Somerled's military might is preserved as an entry in the Annals of Ulster. The entry, which outlines his final foray, states that Somerled commanded forces drawn from Argyll, Kintyre, the Isles, and Dublin. It is not improbable that this massive host also included men from Galloway, Moray, and Orkney.

From about 1160 to 1164, Somerled disappears from the historical record, and little is known of his activities. In 1164, the Annals of Ulster reveal that he attempted to persuade Flaithbertach Ua Brolcháin, Abbot of Derry (d. 1175) to relocate to Iona. As head of the Columban monastic community, a network of religious houses once centred on Iona, Flaithbertach's removal to the island would have placed the community's leadership within the heart of Somerled's sphere of influence. Although Somerled's stratagem was met with significant opposition, particularly from Muirchertach, Flaithbertach's secular overlord, the proposed move suggests that Somerled nursed ambitions beyond the Isles in northern Ireland. These ambitions came to nothing with his death later that year. Compared to his immediate descendants, who associated themselves with reformed monastic orders from the continent, Somerled appears have been something of a religious traditionalist. His attempt to restore the Columban leadership to Iona starkly contrasted with the actions of his descendants, who oversaw the obliteration of the island's Columban monastery, and founded a Benedictine monastery in its place.

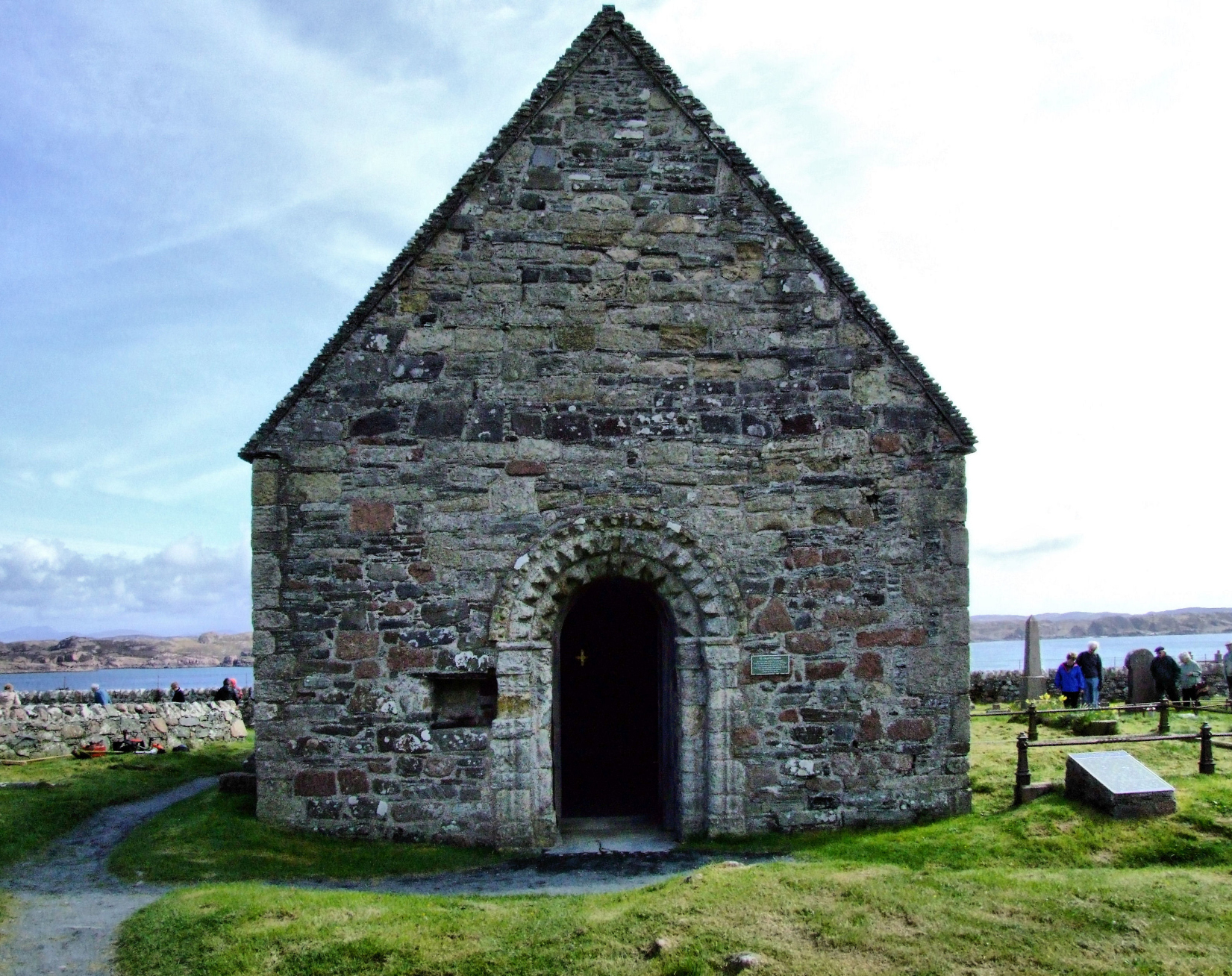
St Oran's Chapel, the oldest intact building on Iona, may have been built by Somerled, Ranald, or members of the Crovan dynasty.

Either Somerled or Ranald could have founded Saddell Abbey, a rather small Cistercian house, situated in the traditional heartland of Somerled's later descendants. This, now ruinous monastery, is the only Cisterian house known to have been founded in the Scottish Highlands. Surviving evidence from the monastery itself suggests that Ranald was the founder. However, evidence that Somerled was the founder may be preserved in a 13th-century French list of Cistercian houses which names a certain "Sconedale" under the year 1160. One possibility is that, while Somerled may have begun the planning a Cistercian house at Saddell, it was Ranald who first endowed it. However, Somerled's attempt to relocate the Columban leadership to Iona in 1164, when Cistercians were already established in the Isles, may be evidence that he found newer reformed orders of continental Christianity unpalatable. Furthermore, the ecclesiastical patronage of his immediate descendants reveals that they were not averse to such orders, which may suggest that Ranald was indeed the monastery's founder. Although 19th-century tradition claimed that Somerled was buried at the abbey, he is more likely to have been laid to rest on Iona, as claimed in 17th-century tradition. The oldest intact building on Iona is St Oran's chapel. Certain Irish influences in its architecture indicate that it dates to about the mid-12th century. The building was used as a mortuary by later descendants of Somerled's son Ranald, and either Ranald or Somerled may have built it. (Note: It is also possible that St Oran's chapel was erected by members of the Crovan dynasty: either Somerled's brother-in-law Godred, who was buried on the island in 1188, or Godred's father (and Somerled's father-in-law) Olaf.)

== Death ==
19th-century illustration of the seal of Walter FitzAlan, depicting a mounted knight, armed with a pennoned lance and shield. Somerled's forces may have fought those of Walter at the Battle of Renfrew.

In 1164, Somerled died in a seaborne invasion of Scotland, which culminated in the disastrous Battle of Renfrew, fought near Renfrew, against forces led by Herbert, Bishop of Glasgow (d. 1164), and Baldwin of Biggar, Sheriff of Lanark (fl. 1160s). The invasion appears to have been well-planned. The Chronicle of Melrose describes Somerled's invasion force as vast, and the Chronicle of Mann numbers it at 160 ships, although the accuracy of such a precise count is contentious given the propensity of mediaeval chroniclers to exaggerate their figures. Both these chronicles record that his forces landed at Renfrew, where they engaged the Scots, suffering "innumerable" casualties at the hands of a much smaller force. According to the Carmen de Morte Sumerledi, although Somerled's forces were vastly superior to those he encountered, he fell in the outset of battle, against a hastily gathered force of local levies led by the Bishop of Glasgow. Although later tradition, preserved in the History of the MacDonalds and the Book of Clanranald, maintained that Somerled fell by treachery, contemporary sources indicate that he more likely fell in battle. (Note: The History of the MacDonalds specifies that Somerled was stabbed to death by his nephew, Maurice MacNeill, whereas the Book of Clanranald states that Somerled was killed by his page. Such traditions are sometimes crafted to explain deaths of heroic figures, imagined by later generations to have been almost invincible in battle. The tradition of treachery was popularised by Nigel Tranter's 1983 novel Lord of the Isles.) The Carmen de Morte Sumerledi, written by an eyewitness, records that Somerled was "wounded by a [thrown] spear and cut down by the sword", and states that a priest severed his head and delivered it into the bishop's hands. Several sources also state that a son of Somerled was slain in the battle, with the Annals of Tigernach identifying him as GilleBride. (Note: According to the 14th century Scottish chronicler John of Fordun, Somerled was slain with a son named GilleCallum. Fordun's GilleCallum may well be a mistake for GilleBride.) (Note: The Orkneyinga saga gives a very confused account of Somerled, and appears to have conflated him with another man. The saga's narrative relates that he was slain by Sweyn Asleifsson in about 1156.)

It is uncertain why Somerled launched his attack upon the Scots. The early 1160s saw a period of Scottish consolidation in the maritime region between the Lennox and Cowal, and along the eastern coast of the Firth of Clyde towards Galloway. David may well have begun the infeftment and settlement of this coastal district decades earlier, to counter the seaborne threat that the rulers of Argyll posed during the dynastic challenges of the 1130s. By the 1160s, some of the greatest Scottish magnates had taken root in the region, and some of them may have begun to extend their influence into southern Argyll and the Islands of the Clyde. The catalyst for Somerled's invasion, therefore, may have been the encroachment of Scottish influence into his own sphere of hegemony. The target of his invasion appears to have been Renfrew, the centre of the family of Walter FitzAlan, Steward of Scotland, and Somerled's forces may well have engaged those of Walter—possibly even led by the steward himself. The precise chronology of Walter's westward expansion is not known for certain, but he and Somerled likely had conflicting ambitions in the region. Although Somerled may have sought to eliminate or reduce this perceived threat, the massive scale of his seaborne assault suggests that he may have nursed even greater ambitions. With an increasingly ill and possibly incapacitated king upon the Scottish throne, the real motivation behind Somerled's last operation may well have been sheer opportunism.

== Aftermath ==
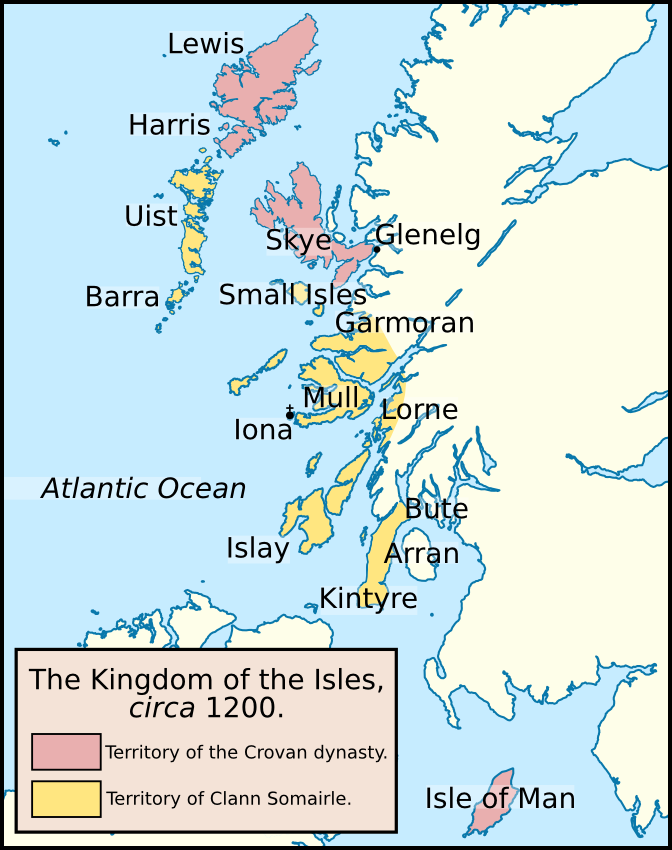
Map of the divided Kingdom of the Isles, about 1200. The lands of Godred's descendants, bordering those of Somerled's descendants.

In the wake of Somerled's demise, his once vast sea-kingdom fragmented, as various would-be successors vied for dominance. Although Dugald may have held onto the kingship for a short while, before the end of the year the Chronicle of Mann records that his maternal uncle, Ragnvald Olafsson, violently seized control of Mann and gained the kingship. Immediately afterwards, Godred arrived in the Isles after almost a decade in exile, defeated his brother Ragnvald with Norwegian assistance, and secured himself upon the throne. In time, Godred appears to have regained most of the northern Hebrides and Skye. The Hebridean territories lost to Somerled in 1156, however, appear to have been retained by the latter's descendants. It is more than likely that this domain was divided amongst his surviving sons, although contemporary sources are silent on the matter. The precise allotment of lands is unknown. Although the division of lands amongst later generations of descendants is known, such boundaries are unlikely to have existed during the chaotic 12th century. The territory of Somerled's surviving sons may have stretched from Glenelg in the north to the Mull of Kintyre in the south—possibly with Angus ruling the northernmost region, Dugald centred in Lorne (with possibly the bulk of the inheritance), and Ranald in Kintyre and the southern islands.

Although the Scots may have originally welcomed the collapse and reordering of Somerled's sea-kingdom, his death triggered decades of instability in the region, and the Norwegian intervention on Godred's behalf signalled that Scotland was not the only external power with interests in the region. The void left by Somerled's death was soon seized upon by Walter and his succeeding son, Alan, who continued their family's westward expansion. Internal conflict wracked Somerled's descendants in the decades following his death. Locked in conflict with his brother Angus, Ranald appears to have forged an alliance with Alan to gain the upper hand. Either through this alliance, or through the exploitation of the internal conflict amongst Somerled's descendants, the steward's family appears to have secured Bute by about 1200.

== Descendants ==
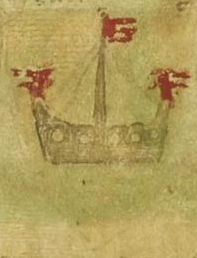
An early coat of arms borne by one of Somerled's descendants, featuring a galley (or lymphad). (Note: This coat of arms is that of Alexander MacDougall, Lord of Argyll (d. 1310), which appears in the early 14th century Balliol Roll. The coat of arms is blazoned: Or, a galley Sable with dragon heads at prow and stern and flag flying Gules, charged on the hull with four portholes Argent. It is the only known example of the painted arms of the MacDougall Lords of Lorne. The earliest correctly painted coat of arms of a MacDonald dates to the mid-15th century, and is blazoned: Or, an eagle displayed Gules surmounting a lymphad Sable within a double tressure flory counterflory Gules. The galley appears to have been a symbol of the kings of the Crovan dynasty. Its later use in Scottish heraldry, as a totemic heraldic charge, likely alludes to the power of old Norse dynasties.)

Somerled is known to have had at least five sons and a daughter. (Note: Early modern tradition accords several more sons to Somerled, although the historicity of these late and unsupported claims is contentious. The Book of Clanranald identifies one in Gaelic as "Gall mac Sgillin", a name which is similar to that of MacScelling, the leader of Muirchertach Mac Lochlainn's aforementioned mercenarial fleet, routed near Inishowen in 1154. Two other sons, "Sommerled" and "Gillies", are assigned to Somerled in the History of the MacDonalds.) GilleBride, who was slain in battle with his father, was likely a product of an early unknown marriage. Olaf is only named in the Chronicle of Mann. Angus defeated his brother Ranald in 1192; after that the latter disappears from record altogether. Nothing further is known of Angus, other than his defeat and death, together with his sons (and the extinction of his line) at the hands of Ranald's sons in 1210. Dugald is last recorded in 1175, whilst in the company of his sons in England. Bethoc, Somerled's daughter, was prioress of Iona Nunnery. Both Dugald and Ranald left powerful descendants. From Dugald descended the 13th-century Lords of Argyll, and Clan MacDougall. From Ranald descended the Lords of the Isles, Clan Donald, Clan MacRory, and Clan MacAlister.

Since the early 2000s, several genetic studies have been conducted on men bearing surnames traditionally associated with patrilineal descendants of Somerled. The results of one such study, published in 2004, revealed that five chiefs of Clan Donald, who all traced their patrilineal descent from Somerled, were indeed descended from a common ancestor. (Note: The five chiefs were: Macdonald of Macdonald, Macdonald of Sleat, Macdonald of Clanranald, MacDonell of Glengarry, and McAlester of Loup and Kennox. All five trace their patrilineal descent from Somerled's grandson, Donald.) Further testing of men bearing the surnames MacAlister, MacDonald, and MacDougall, found that, of a small sample group, 40% of MacAlisters, 30% of MacDougalls, and 18% of MacDonalds shared this genetic marker. These percentages suggest that Somerled may have almost 500,000 living patrilineal descendants. (Note: The sum was arrived at by estimating that there are about 2,000,000 male MacDonalds worldwide; so about 400,000 of these MacDonalds likely carry this particular genetic marker. In regard to Somerled, the significant number of his genetic descendants illustrates the tendency for native families in a particular district to be displaced by younger branches of an unrelated chiefly lineage. After several generations, even these branches would tend to be displaced by more recent offshoots of the chiefly line. By this process, over time, many of the district's lower social class would be patrilineally descended from the chiefly line. The vast territorial power of Clan Donald may explain the percentage disparity between the surnames MacAlister, MacDonald, and MacDougall. Historically, the most powerful clans attracted smaller clans as dependants. As surnames came to be borne by Scots in the Late Middle Ages, many dependants adopted the surnames of powerful chiefs, whether they were related or not. In contrast to Clan Donald, less powerful and expansive clans like Clan MacAlister would have attracted fewer unrelated men to adopt their chief's surname. Probably because of this, many more percentages of MacAlisters than MacDonalds are patrilineally descended from chiefly lineages.) The results of a later study, published in 2011, revealed that, of a sample of 164 men bearing the surname MacDonald, 23% carried the same marker borne by the clan chiefs. This marker was identified as a subgroup of haplogroup R1a, known to be extremely rare in Celtic-speaking areas of Scotland, but very common in Norway. Both genetic studies concluded that Somerled's patrilineal ancestors originated in Scandinavia.

== Legacy ==
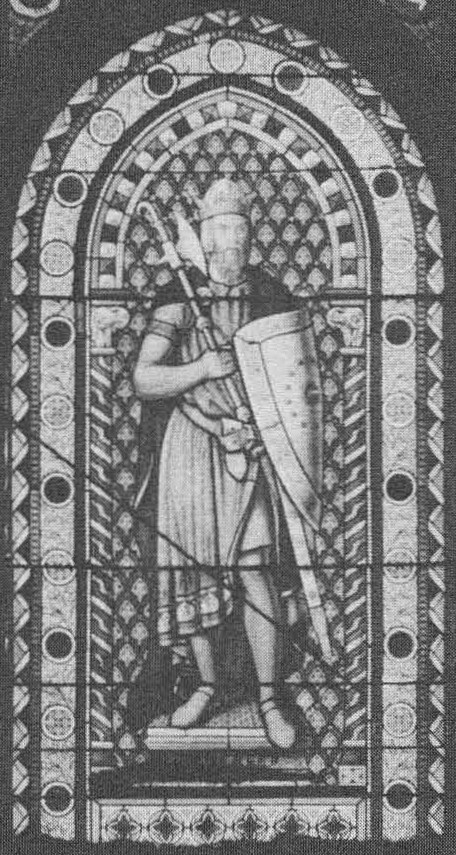
Somerled Rex Insularum, a 19th-century stained glass depiction of Somerled, at Armadale Castle.

Over the years, there have been disparate interpretations of Somerled's life and career. Traditional accounts, such as those expounded in popular histories, clan histories, and 19th-century works, portray Somerled as something of a Celtic hero: a man who liberated Scotland from the clutches of invading Scandinavians, founded an independent kingdom, and initiated a Gaelic renaissance. Such portrayals, founded upon uncritical acceptance of the narratives within early modern sources, are contrary to the evidence preserved in contemporary sources. Although early modern sources and some later histories portray Somerled's rise in the Isles in xenophobic terms of Celt versus Scandinavian, modern historical scholarship views Somerled in the same cultural environment as his rival brother-in-law, Godred.

Until recently, modern scholarship, heavily influenced by 19th-century historiographical perceptions of ethnicity, has placed Somerled's conflicts with the Scots in the context of supposed native Celtic conservatism against the spread of foreign feudalisation. (Note: A historiographical framework coalesced in the 19th and early 20th centuries based on contrasting supposed Celtic and non-Celtic stereotypes. Celts were assumed to have been conservative and backward, whilst non-Celts were assumed to have been progressive, industrious, and intolerant to native customs. Nineteenth-century Celtists—historians and antiquarians who sympathised with the native medieval Scots—presented the 11th and 12th centuries as a period of an epic clash of cultures; where native Celts, and Celtic institutions, gave way before the advancement of non-Celtic customs, and inevitable modernisation. So modern historians have tended to treat medieval Scottish law, kingship, lordship, and religion in the context of ethnic opposition—Celtic versus non-Celtic.) More recent scholarship, however, has emphasised the remarkable receptiveness of natives to so-called feudal customs introduced into northern Scotland during this period. The consistent misidentification of Malcolm, his brother-in-law, with Malcolm MacHeth, has been interpreted as evidence that Somerled backed the cause of a supposed native anti-feudal movement. The more recent realisation that this brother-in-law was instead a son of Alexander I, however, places Somerled's conflict with the Scottish crown in the context of participation in the continuous inter-dynastic insurrection faced by David I and his descendants, rather than a clash between pro- and anti-feudal partisans. As such, marital affiliations lay behind many of Somerled's recorded actions.

== Depictions in Fiction ==
•Somerled is the central figure in the novel Summer Warrior by Regan Walker that tells the story of how the Norse-Gael forged the Kingdom of the Isles.

•Somerled is the protagonist in the novel Lord of the Isles by Nigel Tranter.

•Somerled is the protagonist in the novel The Winter Isles by Antonia Senior.

•Somerled is the protagonist in the novel Second Sons: Somerled - First Lord of the Isles by John Agar.

== See also ==
- History of the Outer Hebrides
- Scotland in the High Middle Ages
- Kingdom of the Isles
- Clann Somhairle

== Citations ==
Regnal titles
Preceded by Godred Olafsson	King of the Isles; 1158–1164	Succeeded by Ragnvald Olafsson
