= Malcolm IV of Scotland =

King of Alba from 1153 to 1165

Malcolm IV
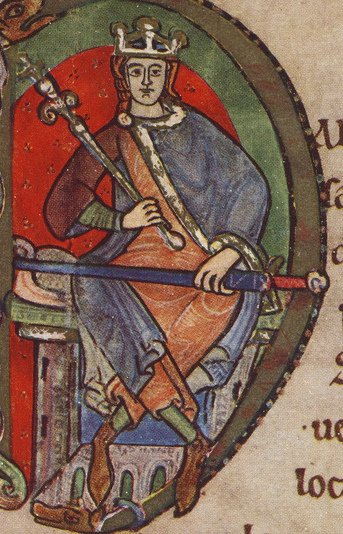

King of Alba (Scotland)
- Reign: 24 May 1153 – 9 December 1165
- Inauguration: 27 May 1153
- Predecessor: David I
- Successor: William I
- Born: 23 April–24 May 1141; Scotland
- Died: 9 December 1165 (aged 24); Jedburgh, Roxburghshire, Scotland
- Burial: Dunfermline Abbey
- House: Dunkeld
- Father: Henry, Earl of Huntingdon and Northumbria
- Mother: Ada de Warenne

Malcolm IV (Medieval Gaelic: Máel Coluim mac Eanric; Scottish Gaelic: Maol Chaluim mac Eanraig), nicknamed Virgo, "the Maiden" (between 23 April and 24 May 1141 – 9 December 1165) was King of Scotland from 1153 until his death. He was the eldest son of Henry, Earl of Huntingdon and Northumbria (died 1152) and Ada de Warenne. The original Malcolm Canmore, a name now associated with his great-grandfather Malcolm III (Máel Coluim mac Donnchada), he succeeded his grandfather David I, and shared David's Anglo-Norman tastes.

Called Malcolm the Maiden by later chroniclers, a name which may incorrectly suggest weakness or effeminacy to modern readers, he was noted for his religious zeal and interest in knighthood and warfare. For much of his reign, he was in poor health and died unmarried at the age of twenty-four.

== Accession ==
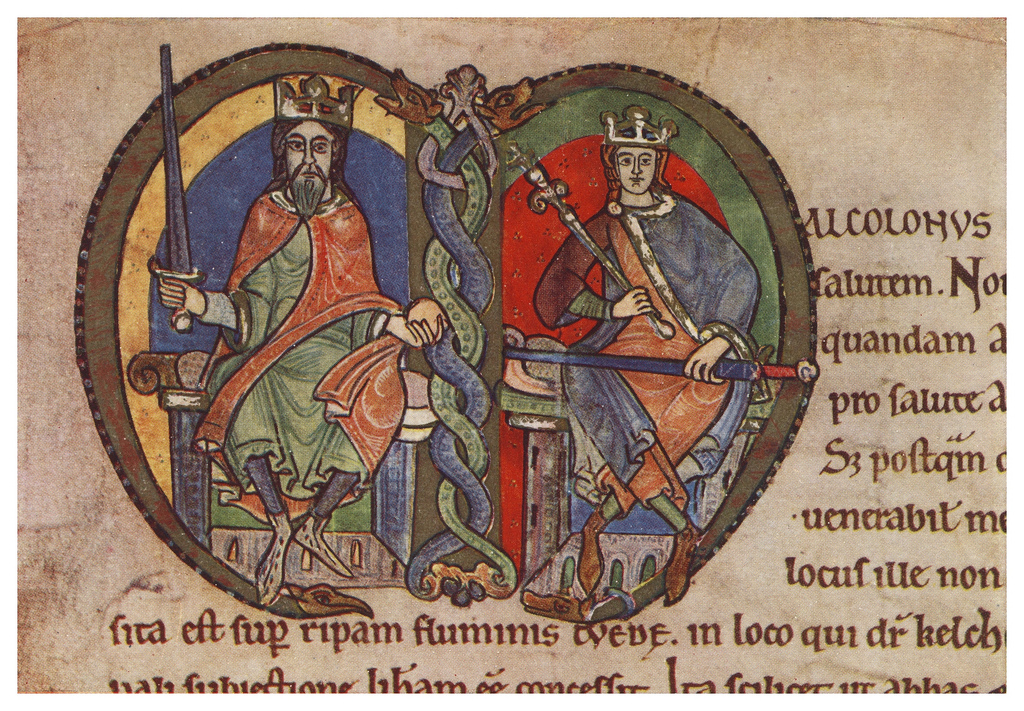
David I (left) with the young Malcolm IV (right) depicted on the charter to Kelso Abbey.

Earl Henry, son and heir of King David I of Scotland, had been in poor health throughout the 1140s. He died suddenly on 12 June 1152. His death occurred in either Newcastle or Roxburgh, both located in those areas of Northumbria which he and his father had attached to the Scots crown in the period of English weakness after the death of Henry I of England. Unlike in the case of the English king, who had been left without male heirs after the death of his only legitimate son in the shipwreck of the White Ship, the King of Scots, David I, did not lack for immediate heirs upon the death of Earl Henry. This was because Earl Henry had left behind three sons to carry forward the lineage of his father.

Malcolm, the eldest of Earl Henry's sons, was only eleven years old when he became heir apparent. Nonetheless, he was sent by his grandfather on a circuit of the kingdom, accompanied by Donnchad, Mormaer of Fife, and a large army. Donnchad had been styled rector, perhaps indicating that he was to hold the regency for Malcolm on David's death. These preparations were timely, because King David survived his son by less than a year, dying on 24 May 1153 at Carlisle. Malcolm was inaugurated as king on 27 May 1153 at Scone at age twelve. Donnchad, who duly became regent for the young Malcolm, ensured that the inauguration took place before the old king was even buried. This might appear unseemly, but there was good reason for the haste. Malcolm was not without rivals for the kingship. Donnchad himself died a year later, in 1154.

== Rivals and neighbours ==
The Orkneyinga Saga claims "William the Noble", son of William fitz Duncan, was the man whom "every Scotsman wanted for his king". As William fitz Duncan married Alice de Rumilly c.1137, young William could only have been a youth, perhaps a child, by 1153. There is no evidence to suggest that William ever made any claims to the throne, and he died young, in the early 1160s, leaving his sizable estates to his three sisters. Of William Fitz Duncan's other sons, Bishop Wimund had already been blinded, emasculated and imprisoned at Byland Abbey before King David's death, but Domnall mac Uilleim, first of the Meic Uilleim, had considerable support in the Province of Moray. Another contender, imprisoned at Roxburgh since about 1130, was Máel Coluim mac Alaxandair, an illegitimate son of Alexander I. Máel Coluim's sons were free men in 1153. They could be expected to contest the succession and did so.

As a new and young king, Malcolm also faced threats to his rule from his neighbours. Foremost among them were Somerled, King of Argyll; Fergus, Lord of Galloway; and Henry II, King of England. Only Rognvald Kali Kolsson, Earl of Orkney, was otherwise occupied (on a pilgrimage), and his death in 1158 brought the young and ambitious Harald Maddadsson to power in Orkney, who proved yet another threat to the young Malcolm.

The first open opposition to Malcolm came in November 1153, from family rivals, the sons of Máel Coluim mac Alaxandair. They mounted their challenge with the aid of a neighbour, Somerled of Argyll. This threat soon dissipated, because Somerled was beset with more pressing concerns: his war with Guðrøðr Óláfsson, King of the Isles lasted until 1156 and a possible conflict with Gille Críst, Mormaer of Menteith, over Cowal, loomed large. Support for the sons of Máel Coluim mac Alaxandair may also have come from areas closer to the core of the kingdom; two conspirators are named by chroniclers, one of whom died in trial by combat in February 1154.

In 1157, it is reported, King Malcolm was reconciled with Máel Coluim MacHeth, who was appointed to the Mormaerdom of Ross, which had probably been held by his father.

== Malcolm IV and Henry II ==
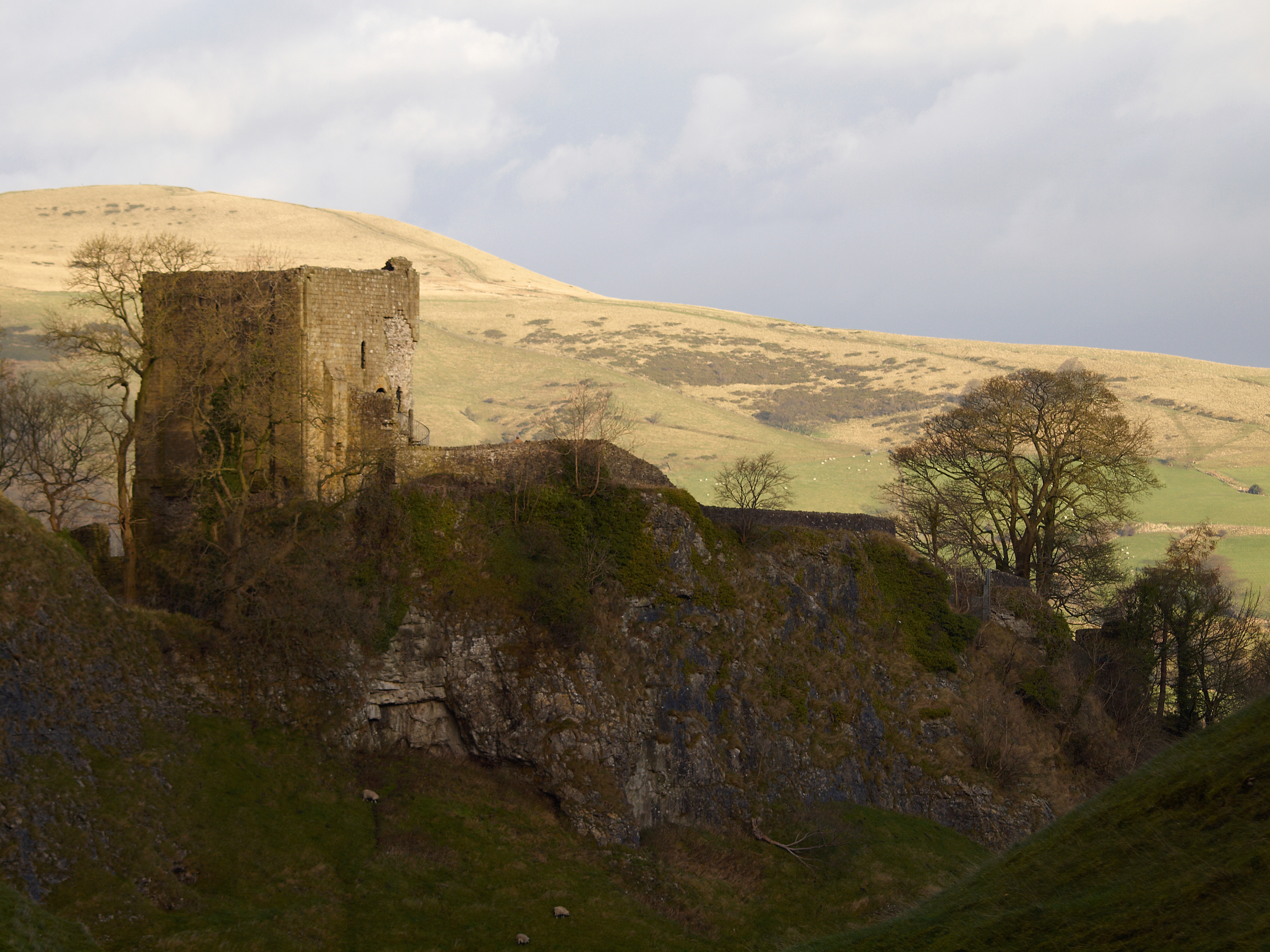
Peveril Castle in Derbyshire, where Malcolm paid homage to Henry II in 1157

Malcolm was not only King of Scots but also inherited the Earldom of Northumbria, which his father and grandfather had gained during the wars between Stephen and Empress Matilda. Malcolm granted Northumbria to his brother William, keeping Cumbria for himself. Cumbria was, like the earldoms of Northumbria and Huntingdon, and later Chester, a fief of the English crown. While Malcolm delayed doing homage to Henry II of England for his possessions in Henry's kingdom, he did so in 1157 at Peveril Castle in Derbyshire and later at Chester. Henry II refused to allow Malcolm to keep Cumbria, or William to keep Northumbria, but instead granted the Earldom of Huntingdon to Malcolm, for which Malcolm did homage.

After a second meeting between Malcolm and Henry, at Carlisle in 1158, "they returned without having become good friends, and so that the king of Scots was not yet knighted." In 1159 Malcolm accompanied Henry to France, serving at the siege of Toulouse where he was, at last, knighted. "Whether this was the act of a king of Scots or of an earl of Huntingdon we are not told; it was certainly the act of a man desperate for knightly arms, but that did not make it any more acceptable in Scotland."

Malcolm returned from Toulouse in 1160. At Perth, Roger of Hoveden reports, he faced a rebellion by six earls, led by Ferchar, Mormaer of Strathearn, who besieged the king. Given that Earl Ferchar heads the list of those named, it is presumed that Donnchad II, Mormaer of Fife, was not among the rebels. John of Fordun's version in the Gesta Annalia appears to suggest a peaceful settlement to the affair, and both Fordun and Hoveden follow the report of the revolt and its ending by stating that the king led an expedition into Galloway where he eventually defeated Fergus, Lord of Galloway and took his son Uchtred as a hostage while Fergus became a monk at Holyrood, dying there in 1161. While it was assumed that the earls included Fergus among their number and that the expedition to Galloway was related to the revolt, it is now thought that the earls sought to have Malcolm attack Galloway, perhaps as a result of raids by Fergus.

Sometime before July 1163, when he did homage to Henry II, Malcolm was taken seriously ill at Doncaster. Scottish sources report that a revolt in Moray brought Malcolm north, and it is said that he:

[R]emoved [the men of Moray] from the land of their birth, as of old Nebuchadnezzar, king of Babylon, had dealt with the Jews, and scattered them throughout the other districts of Scotland, both beyond the [Mounth] and this side thereof, so that not even one native of that land abode there.

Having made peace with Henry, replaced Fergus of Galloway with his sons, and resettled Moray, only one of Malcolm's foes remained, Somerled, by 1160 king of the Isles as well as of Argyll. In 1164, Somerled led a large army of Islesmen and Irishmen to attack Glasgow and Renfrew, where Walter Fitzalan had newly completed a castle. There Somerled and his son Gillebrigte were killed in battle with the levies of the area, led by the Bishop of Glasgow, probably Herbert of Selkirk at that time. The chronicles of the day attributed the victory to the intercession of Saint Kentigern.

== Marriage project ==
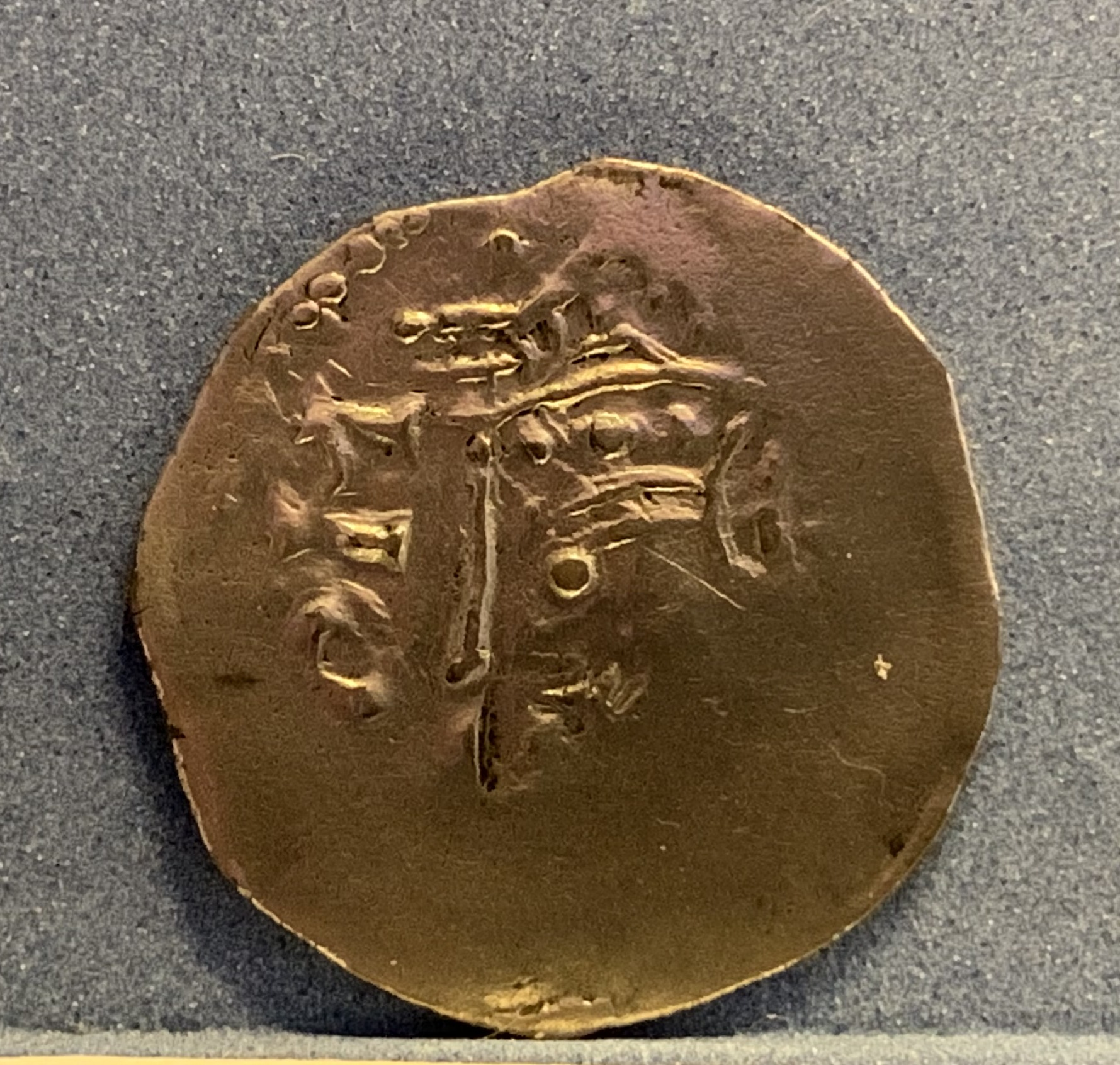
Silver penny of Malcolm IV (Museum on the Mound)

In 1160, a marriage between Malcolm and Constance of Penthièvre was considered. Constance's brother Conan IV, Duke of Brittany had married Malcolm's sister Margaret earlier the same year. However, Constance refused to marry the Scottish king, hoping to wed the French king Louis VII instead, but Louis married Adèle of Champagne.

== Death and posterity ==
Malcolm IV died on 9 December 1165 at Jedburgh, aged twenty-four. His premature death may have been hastened by Paget's disease (a chronic disorder that typically results in enlarged and deformed bones). While his contemporaries were in no doubt that Malcolm had some of the qualities of a great king, later writers were less convinced. The compiler of the Annals of Ulster, writing soon after 1165, praises Malcolm:

Máel Coluim Cenn Mór, son of Henry, high king of Scotland, the best Christian that was of the Gaidhil [who dwell] by the sea on the east for almsdeeds, hospitality and piety, died.

Likewise, William of Newburgh praises Malcolm, "the most Christian king of the Scots", highly in his Historia Rerum Anglicarum.

Nonetheless, Malcolm was not well regarded in all quarters. The Gesta Annalia remarks:

[Malcolm] quite neglected the care, as well as governance, of his kingdom. Wherefore he was so hated by all the common people that William, the elder of his brothers – who had always been on bad terms with the English, and their lasting foe, forasmuch as they had taken away his patrimony, the earldom of Northumbria, to wit – was by them appointed warden of the whole kingdom, against the king's will.

According to legend, he had a daughter who was betrothed to Henry, Prince of Capua, on the latter's deathbed, but this is said to be false as Malcolm had no heirs. However, since illegitimacy did not apply to medieval females, but it was often pretended that it did, she may have been overlooked. Malcolm's mother had formulated a plan for a marriage to Constance, daughter of Conan III, Duke of Brittany, but Malcolm died before the wedding could be celebrated. This does not mean that Malcolm could not have had a concubine or mistress.

It is difficult, given the paucity of sources, to date many of the reforms of the Scoto-Norman era, but it appears that Malcolm continued the reforms begun by his grandfather and grand-uncles. The sheriffdoms of Crail, Dunfermline, Edinburgh, Forfar, Lanark and Linlithgow appear to date from Malcolm's reign, and the office of Justiciar of Lothian may also date from this period.

Malcolm founded a Cistercian monastery at Coupar Angus, and the royal taste for continental religious foundations extended to the magnates, as in Galloway, where the Premonstratensians were established at Soulseat by 1161.

== Fictional portrayals ==
Malcolm IV has been depicted in historical novels. They include:

- Lord of the Isles (1983) by Nigel Tranter. The main character of the novel is Somerled, Lord of the Isles. The plot follows his military career, rise to power, swearing of fealty to David I of Scotland, and support of a revolt against Malcolm IV. It concludes with the murder of Somerled.
- Tapestry of the Boar (1993) by Nigel Tranter. The main character is Hugh De Swinton, a huntsman at the court of Malcolm IV. He is at first employed to slay wild boars which threaten humans, sheep and cattle of the Scottish countryside. He then serves as a scout to the army of the king during the conflict with Fergus of Galloway. Malcolm IV eventually tasks Hugh with establishing Soutra Aisle, "the first real hospital for the sick and poor in Scotland".

Malcolm IV of Scotland House of Dunkeld Born: April/May 1141 Died: 9 December 1165
Preceded by David I	King of Scotland; 1153–1165	Succeeded by William I
Vacant Title last held by Simon II de Senlis	Earl of Huntingdon; 1157–1165	Succeeded by William
