= MacHeths =

The MacHeths were a Celtic kindred who raised several rebellions against the kings of Scotland in the 12th and 13th centuries. Their origins have long been debated.

== Origins ==
The main controversy concerning the MacHeths is their origin. The key question relates to the paternity of Máel Coluim MacHeth, the first known of the kindred. The present orthodoxy makes Máel Coluim the son of one Beth (or Áed or Eth), Mormaer of Ross, who witnessed two charters in the early reign of David I. Earlier theories involved conflating two persons generally now seen as distinct: Máel Coluim MacHeth and Máel Coluim mac Alaxandair, an illegitimate son of Alexander I.

Even when it is accepted that Máel Coluim MacHeth was the son of Áed of Ross, this has raised further questions concerning the background of the kindred and the nature of their claims. The general consensus favours a background in Ross, and claims to the Mormaerdom; descent from the Scots royal house, perhaps through Domnall, son of Máel Coluim mac Donnchada, who died in 1085, has also been proposed.

== Dramatis personae ==
=== Máel Coluim mac Alaxandair ===
Máel Coluim, now presumed to be the son of Alexander rather than MacHeth, first appears in 1124, when Orderic Vitalis reports:

But Máel Coluim, base-born son of Alexander, affected to snatch the kingdom from his uncle [David], and fought against him two sufficiently fierce battles. But David, who was loftier in understanding and in power and wealth, conquered him and his followers.

It is not certain whether it was this Máel Coluim, the royal bastard, who married a sister of Somerled, king (or lord) of Argyll. If it were he, then this must have been prior to his capture and imprisonment in 1134. He was held at Roxburgh, and was still there in 1156 when his son was captured at Whithorn and imprisoned with him.

=== Máel Coluim MacHeth ===
If it is accepted that this Máel Coluim and the son of Alexander I are not one and the same, Máel Coluim MacHeth appears in 1157, when it is said that he was reconciled with the king, Malcolm IV. It appears that he was restored to the mormaerdom of Ross, which he held until his death in around 1168.

=== Domnall MacHeth ===
The existence of Domnall MacHeth is dependent upon accepting that Máel Coluim MacHeth was the prisoner of Roxburgh and the husband of Somerled's sister. If this is so, then Domnall was involved in a rebellion early in the reign of Malcolm IV, was captured at Whithorn in 1156 and was, perhaps, released in 1157 when his father was restored as Mormaer of Ross in 1157.

=== Adam mac Domnaill ===
In 1186, a certain Adam son of Domnall, "the king's outlaw", was killed by Máel Coluim, Mormaer of Atholl, in the sanctuary of the church at Cupar, and the church burnt with 58 of Adam's associates within. It may be that this Adam mac Domnaill was a son of Domnall mac Uilleim. However, his identification is not certain. One reading would give his name as Áed mac Domnaill, and it may be that he should be counted among the MacHeths.

=== Kenneth MacHeth ===
As with the Meic Uilleim, the MacHeths disappear from history in the years around 1200. It may be that there were no adult male MacHeths to press their claims to Ross, or that the record is incomplete. This is the period in which Harald Maddadsson, Earl of Orkney, appears as the chief threat to the Kings of Scots in the north.

The next, and last, MacHeth to be reported is Kenneth (or Cináed), who joined with Domnall Bán mac Uilleim and an unnamed Irish prince, to invade Ross in 1215, shortly after the death of king William. This invasion proved to be no threat to the new king, Alexander II, as it was defeated by Ferchar mac in tSagairt, the future Mormaer of Ross, who killed the leaders and sent their heads to King Alexander. With this, the MacHeth claims to Ross appear to have ended.

The chiefs of the Highland Clan Ross were direct descendants of the aforementioned Ferchar mac in tSagairt, Mormaer of Ross and according to one historian the chiefs of the Highland Clan Mackay were probably direct descendants of the aforementioned Kenneth MacHeth. The two clans later feuded in the 15th century.

== See also ==
- Clan Mackay
