= Mormaer Beth =

Mormaer Beth is a name of a Mormaer mentioned in an unreliable charter granted to Scone Priory, later Scone Abbey, by king Alexander I of Scotland.

The charter (Lawrie XXXVI) says, merely, Beth comes (i.e. Mormaer Beth). This could be a mistake for Heth, a form often used for the Gaelic name Áed, or perhaps MacBethad, or even a real name as Beth, meaning life. Alternatively, the name may have been made up by either the scribe or his overseer. The only reason for associating Beth with Fife is that he appears first in the witness list, an honour often but certainly not always given to the Mormaers of Fife amongst the other Scottish Mormaers.

It is more probable that Beth this is the same person as Áed, either Mormaer of Moray or Mormaer of Ross, attested in two early charters of David I. Áed disappears from the record ca. 1130. His identification as the ancestor of the MacHeths is uncertain.

Conflation with Ethelred of Scotland is spurious, and based on the unlikely idea that Ethelred ever was Mormaer of Fife.

== Bibliography ==
- Bannerman, John, "MacDuff of Fife," in A. Grant & K.Stringer (eds.) Medieval Scotland: Crown, Lordship and Community, Essays Presented to G.W.S. Barrow, (Edinburgh, 1993), pp. 20–38
- Lawrie, Sir Archibald C., Early Scottish Charters Prior to A.D. 1153, (Glasgow, 1905), no. XXXVI, pp. 28–31, pp. 283–84
- Duncan, A.A.M., The Kingship of the Scots 842–1292: Succession and Independence. Edinburgh University Press, Edinburgh, 2002. ISBN 0-7486-1626-8
- McDonald, R. Andrew, Outlaws of Medieval Scotland: Challenges to the Canmore Kings, 1058–1266. Tuckwell Press, East Linton, 2003. ISBN 1-86232-236-8
- Oram, Richard, David I: The King Who Made Scotland. Tempus, Stroud, 2004. ISBN 0-7524-2825-X
