= David I of Scotland =

King of Alba from 1124 to 1153

David I
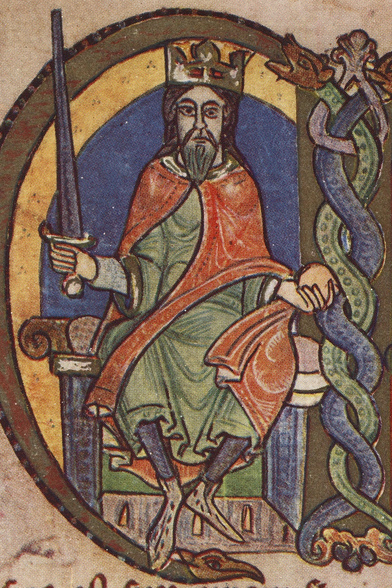

King of Alba (Scotland)
- Reign: 23 April 1124 – 24 May 1153
- Inauguration: Scone, April or May 1124
- Predecessor: Alexander I
- Successor: Malcolm IV

Prince of the Cumbrians
- Reign: 1113–1124
- Born: c. 1084; Scotland
- Died: 24 May 1153 (aged 68–69); Carlisle, England
- Burial: Dunfermline Abbey
- Spouse: Maud, Countess of Huntingdon
- Issue: Henry, Earl of Northumberland
Names
- Dabíd mac Maíl Choluim
- House: Dunkeld
- Father: Malcolm III of Scotland
- Mother: Margaret of Wessex

David I (Modern Gaelic: Daibhidh I mac [Mhaoil] Chaluim; c. 1084 – 24 May 1153) was King of Scotland from 1124 to 1153. He was previously Prince of the Cumbrians from 1113 to 1124. The youngest son of King Malcolm III and Queen Margaret, David spent most of his childhood in Scotland but was exiled to England temporarily in 1093. Perhaps after 1100, he became a dependent at the court of Henry I of England, by whom he was influenced.

When David's brother Alexander I died in 1124, David chose, with the backing of Henry I, to take the Kingdom of Alba (Scotland) for himself. He was forced to engage in warfare against his rival and nephew, Máel Coluim mac Alaxandair. Subduing the latter seems to have taken David ten years, a struggle that involved the destruction of Óengus, Mormaer of Moray. David's victory allowed the expansion of control over more distant regions, theoretically part of his kingdom. After the death of his former patron Henry I, David supported the claims of Henry's daughter and his own niece, Empress Matilda, to the throne of England. In the process, he came into conflict with King Stephen and was able to expand his power in Northern England, despite his defeat at the Battle of the Standard in 1138. David I is a saint of the Catholic Church, with his feast day celebrated on 24 May.

The term "Davidian Revolution" is used by many scholars to summarise the changes that took place in Scotland during his reign. These included his foundation of burghs and regional markets, implementation of the ideals of Gregorian Reform, foundation of monasteries, Normanisation of the Scottish government, and the introduction of feudalism through immigrant Anglo-Norman and Norman knights, as well as Flemish settlers.

== Early years ==
David was born on a date unknown in 1084 in Scotland. He was probably the eighth son of King Malcolm III, and certainly the sixth and youngest born by Malcolm's second wife, Margaret of Wessex. He was the grandson of King Duncan I.

In 1093, King Malcolm and David's brother Edward were killed at the Battle of Alnwick during an invasion of Northumberland. David and his two brothers Alexander and Edgar were probably present when their mother died shortly afterwards. According to later medieval tradition, the three brothers were in Edinburgh when they were besieged by their paternal uncle Donald III, who made himself king. It is not certain what happened next, but an insertion in the Chronicle of Melrose states that Donald forced his three nephews into exile, although he was allied with another of his nephews, Edmund. John of Fordun wrote, centuries later, that an escort into England was arranged for them by their maternal uncle Edgar Ætheling.

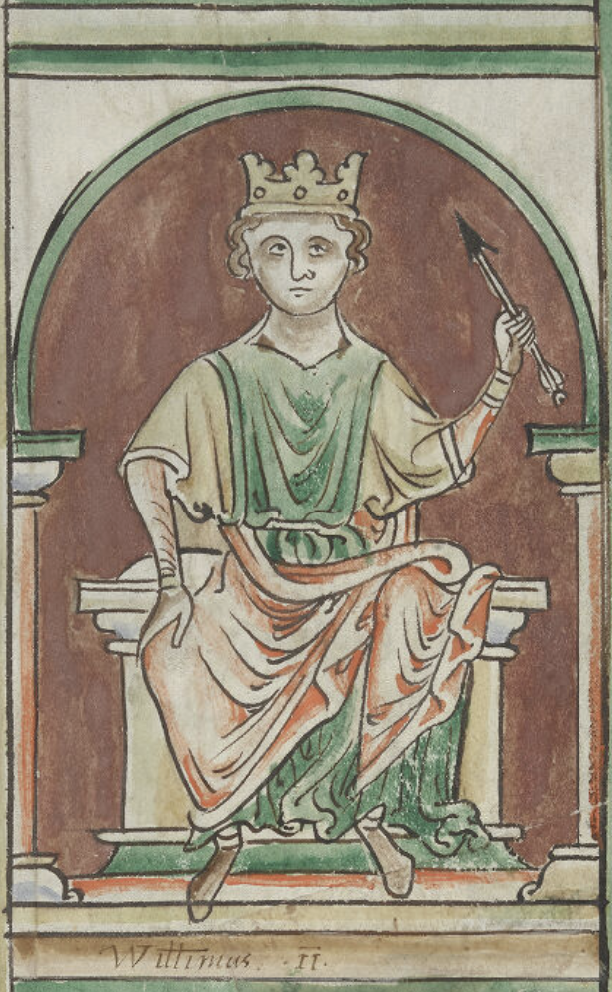
William "Rufus", the Red, King of the English, and partial instigator of the Scottish civil war, 1093–1097.

King William Rufus of England opposed Donald's accession to the northerly kingdom. He sent the eldest son of Malcolm, David's half-brother Duncan, into Scotland with an army. Duncan was killed within the year, and so in 1097 William sent Duncan's half-brother Edgar into Scotland. The latter was more successful and was crowned by the end of 1097.

During the power struggle of 1093–1097, David was in England. In 1093, he may have been about nine years old. From 1093 until 1103, David's presence cannot be accounted for in detail, but he appears to have been in Scotland for the remainder of the 1090s. When William Rufus was killed, his brother Henry Beauclerc seized power and married David's sister, Matilda. The marriage made David the brother-in-law of the ruler of England. From that point onwards, David was probably an important figure at the English court. Despite his Gaelic background, by the end of his stay in England, David had become a fully Normanised prince. William of Malmesbury wrote that it was in this period that David "rubbed off all tarnish of Scottish barbarity through being polished by intercourse and friendship with us".

== Early rule (1113–1124) ==
=== Prince of the Cumbrians ===
Map of David's principality of "the Cumbrians"

David's brother King Edgar had visited William Rufus in May 1099 and bequeathed to David extensive territory to the south of the river Forth. On 8 January 1107, Edgar died. His younger brother Alexander took the throne. It has been assumed that David took control of his inheritance – the southern lands bequeathed by Edgar – soon after the latter's death. However, it cannot be shown that he possessed his inheritance until his foundation of Selkirk Abbey late in 1113. According to Richard Oram, it was only in 1113, when Henry returned to England from Normandy, that David was at last in a position to claim his inheritance in southern Scotland.

King Henry's backing seems to have been enough to force King Alexander to recognise his younger brother's claims. This probably occurred without bloodshed but through the threat of force nonetheless. David's aggression seems to have inspired resentment amongst some native Scots. A Middle Gaelic quatrain from this period complains that:

Olc a ndearna mac Mael Colaim,
ar cosaid re hAlaxandir,
do-ní le gach mac rígh romhaind,
foghail ar faras Albain.

Translation:

It's bad what Máel Coluim's son has done;
dividing us from Alexander;
he causes, like each king's son before;
the plunder of stable Alba.

If "divided from" is anything to go by, this quatrain may have been written in David's new territories in southern Scotland. The lands in question consisted of the Shires of Scotland of Roxburghshire, Selkirkshire, Berwickshire, Peeblesshire and Lanarkshire. David, moreover, gained the title princeps Cumbrensis, "Prince of the Cumbrians", as attested in David's charters from this era. Although this was a large slice of Scotland south of the river Forth, the region of Galloway-proper was entirely outside David's control. David may perhaps have had varying degrees of overlordship in parts of Dumfriesshire, Ayrshire, Dunbartonshire and Renfrewshire. In the lands between Galloway and the Principality of Cumbria, David eventually set up large-scale marcher lordships, such as Annandale for Robert de Brus, Cunningham for Hugh de Morville, and possibly Strathgryfe for Walter Fitzalan.

=== Earl of Huntingdon ===
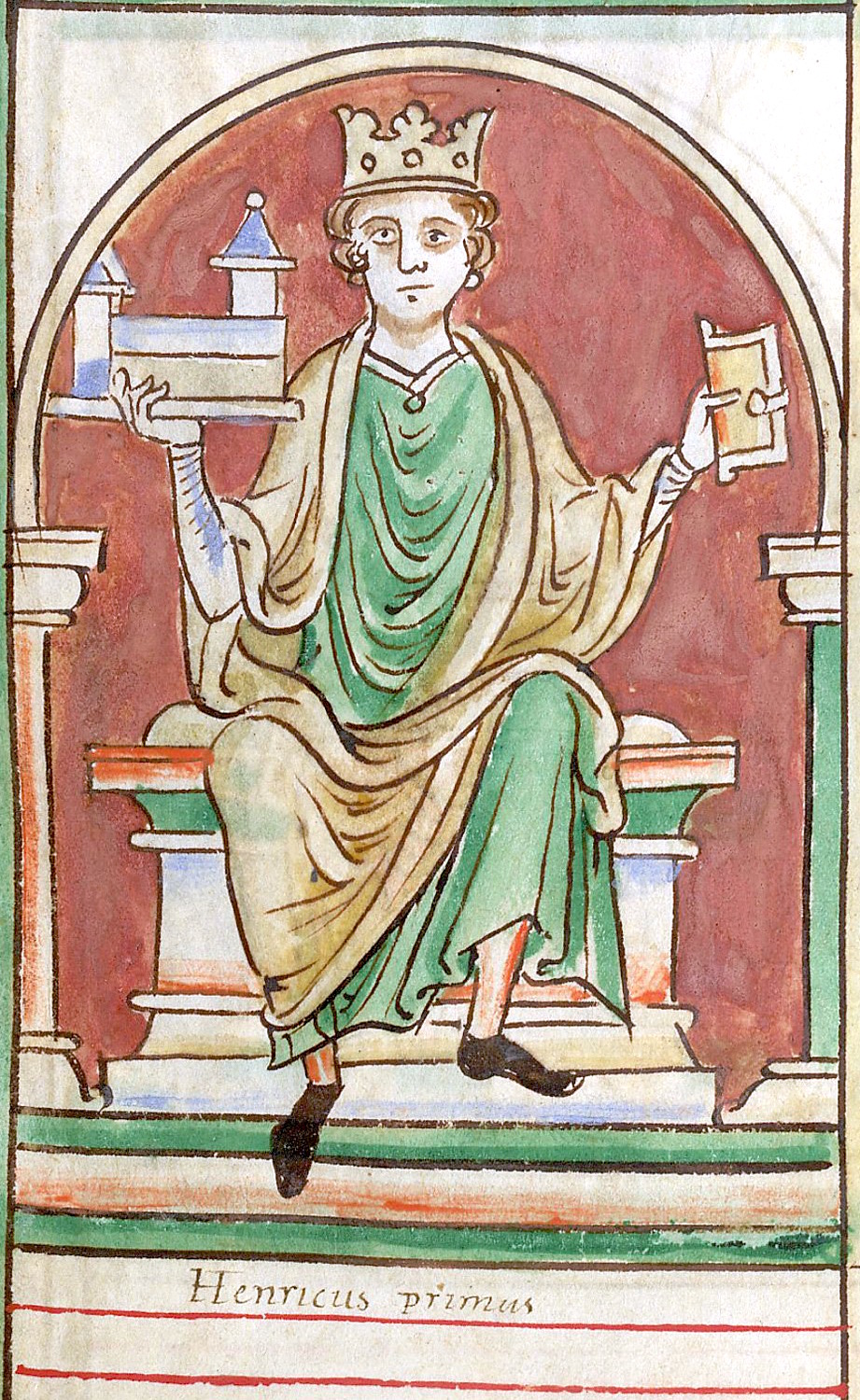
King Henry I of England, drawn by Matthew Paris. Henry's policy in northern Britain and the Irish Sea region essentially made David's political life.

In the later part of 1113, King Henry gave David the hand of Matilda of Huntingdon, daughter and heiress of Waltheof, Earl of Northumbria. The marriage brought with it the Honour of Huntingdon, a lordship scattered through the shires of Northampton, Huntingdon, and Bedford. Within a few years, Matilda bore him two sons: Malcolm, who died young, and Henry, whom David named after his patron.

The new territories which David controlled were a valuable supplement to his income and manpower, increasing his status as one of the most powerful magnates in the Kingdom of the English. Moreover, Matilda's father Waltheof had been Earl of Northumbria, a lordship which had covered the far north of England and included Cumberland and Westmorland, Northumberland-proper, as well as overlordship of the bishopric of Durham. After King Henry's death, David revived the claim to this earldom for his son, Henry.

David's activities and whereabouts after 1114 are not always easy to trace. He spent much of his time outside his principality, in England and Normandy. Despite the death of his sister on 1 May 1118, David still possessed the favour of King Henry when his brother Alexander died in 1124, leaving Scotland without a king.

== Political and military events in Scotland during David's kingship ==
Although David spent his childhood in Scotland, Michael Lynch and Richard Oram portray him as having little initial connection with the culture and society of the Scots; but both likewise argue that David became increasingly re-Gaelicised in the later stages of his reign. Whatever the case, David's claim to be heir to the Scottish kingdom was doubtful. He was the youngest of eight sons of the fifth from last king. Two more recent kings had produced sons, William fitz Duncan, son of King Duncan II, and Máel Coluim, son of the last King Alexander, but since Scots had never adopted the rules of primogeniture that was not a barrier to his kingship, and unlike David, neither William nor Máel Coluim had the support of Henry. So when Alexander died in 1124, the aristocracy of Scotland could either accept David as king or face war with both David and Henry.

=== Coronation and struggle for the kingdom ===
Alexander's son, Máel Coluim, chose war. Orderic Vitalis reported that Máel Coluim mac Alaxandair "affected to snatch the kingdom from [David], and fought against him two sufficiently fierce battles; but David, who was loftier in understanding and in power and wealth, conquered him and his followers". Máel Coluim escaped unharmed into areas of Scotland not yet under David's control, and in those areas gained shelter and aid.

In either April or May of the same year, David was crowned King of Scotland (Old Irish: rí(gh) Alban; Medieval Latin: rex Scottorum) at Scone. If later Scottish and Irish evidence can be taken as evidence, the ceremony of coronation was a series of elaborate traditional rituals, of the kind infamous in the Anglo-French world of the 12th century for their "unchristian" elements.

Aelred of Rievaulx, friend and one-time member of David's court, reported that David "so abhorred those acts of homage which are offered by the Scottish nation in the manner of their fathers upon the recent promotion of their kings, that he was with difficulty compelled by the bishops to receive them".

Outside his Cumbrian principality and the southern fringe of Scotland-proper, David exercised little power in the 1120s, and in the words of Richard Oram, was "king of Scots in little more than name". He was probably in that part of Scotland he did rule for most of the time between late 1127 and 1130. However, he was at the court of Henry in 1126 and in early 1127, and returned to Henry's court in 1130, serving as a judge at Woodstock for the treason trial of Geoffrey de Clinton. It was in this year that David's wife, Matilda of Huntingdon, died. Possibly as a result of this, and while David was still in southern England, Scotland-proper rose up in arms against him. The instigator was, again, his nephew Máel Coluim, who now had the support of Óengus of Moray. King Óengus was David's most powerful vassal, a man who, as grandson of King Lulach of Scotland, even had his own claim to the kingdom. The rebel Scots had advanced into Angus, where they were met by David's Mercian constable, Edward; a battle took place at Stracathro near Brechin. According to the Annals of Ulster, 1000 of Edward's army, and 4000 of Óengus' army – including Óengus himself – died.

According to Orderic Vitalis, Edward followed up the killing of Óengus by marching north into Moray itself, which, in Orderic's words, "lacked a defender and lord"; and so Edward, "with God's help obtained the entire duchy of that extensive district". However, this was far from the end of it. Máel Coluim escaped, and four years of continuing civil war followed; for David, this period was quite simply a "struggle for survival".

It appears that David asked for and obtained extensive military aid from King Henry. Aelred of Rievaulx related that at this point a large fleet and a large army of Norman knights, including Walter Espec, were sent by Henry to Carlisle to assist David's attempt to root out his Scottish enemies. The fleet seems to have been used in the Irish Sea, the Firth of Clyde and the entire Argyll coast, where Máel Coluim was probably at large among supporters. In 1134, Máel Coluim was captured and imprisoned in Roxburgh Castle. Since modern historians no longer confuse him with "Malcolm MacHeth", it is clear that nothing more is ever heard of Máel Coluim mac Alaxandair, except perhaps that his sons were later allied with Somerled.

=== Pacification of the west and north ===
Richard Oram puts forward the suggestion that it was during this period that David granted Walter fitz Alan Strathgryfe, with northern Kyle and the area around Renfrew, forming what would become the "Stewart" lordship of Strathgryfe; he also suggests that Hugh de Morville may have gained Cunningham and the settlement of "Strathyrewen" (i.e. Irvine). This would indicate that the 1130–1134 campaign had resulted in the acquisition of these territories.

How long it took to pacify Moray is not known, but in this period David appointed his nephew William fitz Duncan to succeed Óengus, perhaps in compensation for the exclusion from the succession to the Scottish throne caused by the coming of age of David's son Henry. William may have been given the daughter of Óengus in marriage, cementing his authority in the region. The burghs of Elgin and Forres may have been founded at this point, consolidating royal authority in Moray. David also founded Urquhart Priory, possibly as a "victory monastery", and assigned to it a percentage of his cain (tribute) from Argyll.

During this period too, a marriage was arranged between the son of Matad, Mormaer of Atholl, and the daughter of Haakon Paulsson, Earl of Orkney. The marriage temporarily secured the northern frontier of the kingdom and held out the prospect that a son of one of David's mormaers could gain Orkney and Caithness for the Kingdom of Scotland. Thus, by the time Henry I died on 1 December 1135, David had more of Scotland under his control than ever before.

=== Dominating the north ===
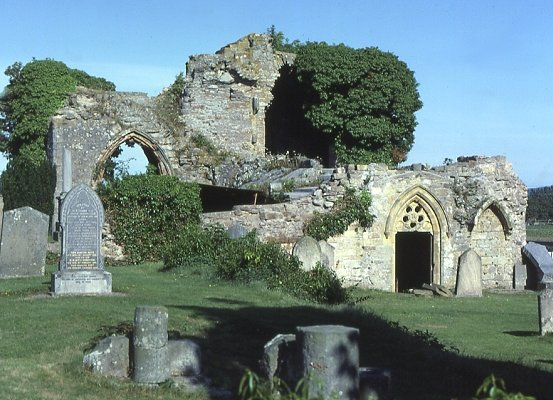
The ruins of Kinloss Abbey in Moray, founded by David in 1150 for a colony of Melrose Cistercians.

While fighting King Stephen and attempting to dominate northern England in the years following 1136, David was continuing his drive for control of the far north of Scotland. In 1139, his cousin, the five-year-old Harald Maddadsson, was given the title of "Earl" and half the lands of the earldom of Orkney, in addition to Scottish Caithness. Throughout the 1140s, Caithness and Sutherland were brought back under the Scottish zone of control. Sometime before 1146, David appointed a native Scot called Aindréas to be the first Bishop of Caithness, a bishopric which was based at Halkirk, near Thurso, in an area which was ethnically Scandinavian.

In 1150, it looked like Caithness and the whole earldom of Orkney were going to come under permanent Scottish control. However, David's plans for the north soon began to encounter problems. In 1151, King Eystein II of Norway put a spanner in the works by sailing through the waterways of Orkney with a large fleet and catching the young Harald unaware in his residence at Thurso. Eystein forced Harald to pay fealty as a condition of his release. Later in the year David hastily responded by supporting the claims to the Orkney earldom of Harald's rival Erlend Haraldsson, granting him half of Caithness in opposition to Harald. King Eystein responded in turn by making a similar grant to this same Erlend, cancelling the effect of David's grant. David's weakness in Orkney was that the Norwegian kings were not prepared to stand back and let him reduce their power.

== England ==
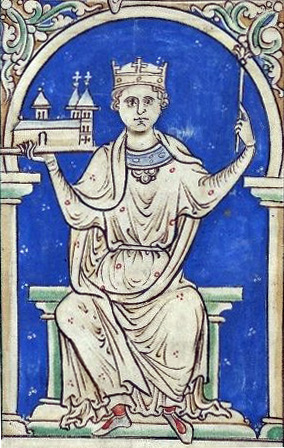
King Stephen drawn by Matthew Paris. David used Stephen's "usurpation" as his casus belli with England, even if it was not the actual reason.

David's relationship with England and the English crown in these years is usually interpreted in two ways. Firstly, his actions are understood in relation to his connections with the King of England. Most historians would agree that King Henry I played a major role in shaping David's early career. David was the latter's brother-in-law and "greatest protégé", one of Henry's "new men". His hostility to Stephen can be interpreted as an effort to uphold the intended inheritance of Henry I, the succession of his daughter and David's niece Empress Matilda. David carried out his wars in her name, joined her when she arrived in England, and later knighted her son Henry.

However, David's policy towards England can be interpreted in an additional way. David was the independence-loving king trying to build a "Scoto-Northumbrian" realm by seizing the most northerly parts of the English kingdom. In this perspective, David's support for Matilda is used as a pretext for land-grabbing. David's maternal descent from the House of Wessex and his son Henry's maternal descent from the English earls of Northumberland is thought to have further encouraged such a project, one that came to an end only after Henry II ordered David's child successor Máel Coluim IV to hand over the most important of David's gains. It is clear that neither one of these interpretations can be taken without some weight being given to the other.

=== Usurpation of Stephen and First Treaty of Durham ===
Henry I had arranged his inheritance to pass to his daughter Empress Matilda. Instead, Stephen, younger brother of Theobald II, Count of Champagne, seized the throne. David had been the first layperson to take the oath to uphold the succession of Matilda in 1127, and when Stephen was crowned on 22 December 1135, David decided to make war.

Before December was over, David marched into northern England, and by the end of January, he had occupied the castles of Carlisle, Wark, Alnwick, Norham and Newcastle. By February, David had reached Durham, but an army led by King Stephen met him there. Rather than fight a pitched battle, a treaty was agreed whereby David would retain Carlisle, while David's son Henry was re-granted the title and half the lands of the earldom of Huntingdon, territory which had been confiscated during David's revolt. On Stephen's side, he received back the other castles; and while David would do no homage, Stephen was to receive the homage of Henry for both Carlisle and the other English territories. Stephen also gave the rather worthless but for David face-saving promise that if he ever chose to resurrect the defunct earldom of Northumberland, Henry would be given first consideration. Importantly, the issue of Matilda was not mentioned. However, the first Durham treaty quickly broke down after David took offence at the treatment of his son Henry at Stephen's court.

=== Renewal of war and Clitheroe ===
When the winter of 1136–1137 was over, David prepared again to invade England. The king of the Scots massed an army on Northumberland's border, to which the English responded by gathering an army at Newcastle. Once more pitched battle was avoided, and instead, a truce was agreed until December. When December fell, David demanded that Stephen hand over the whole of the old earldom of Northumberland. Stephen's refusal led to David's third invasion, this time in January 1138.

The army which invaded England in January and February 1138 shocked the English chroniclers. Richard of Hexham called it "an execrable army, savager than any race of heathen yielding honour to neither God nor man" and that it "harried the whole province and slaughtered everywhere folk of either sex, of every age and condition, destroying, pillaging and burning the vills, churches and houses". Several doubtful stories of cannibalism were recorded by chroniclers, and these same chroniclers paint a picture of routine enslavings, as well as killings of churchmen, women and infants.

By February King Stephen marched north to deal with David. The two armies avoided each other, and Stephen was soon on the road south. In the summer, David split his army into two forces, sending William fitz Duncan to march into Lancashire, where he harried Furness and Craven. On 10 June, William fitz Duncan met a force of knights and men-at-arms. A pitched battle took place, the battle of Clitheroe, and the English army was routed.

=== Battle of the Standard and Second Treaty of Durham ===
By later July 1138, the two Scottish armies had reunited in "St Cuthbert's land", that is, in the lands controlled by the Bishop of Durham, on the far side of the River Tyne. Another English army had mustered to meet the Scots, this time led by William, Earl of Aumale. The victory at Clitheroe was probably what inspired David to risk battle. David's force, apparently 26,000 strong and several times larger than the English army, met the English on 22 August at Cowdon Moor near Northallerton, Yorkshire.

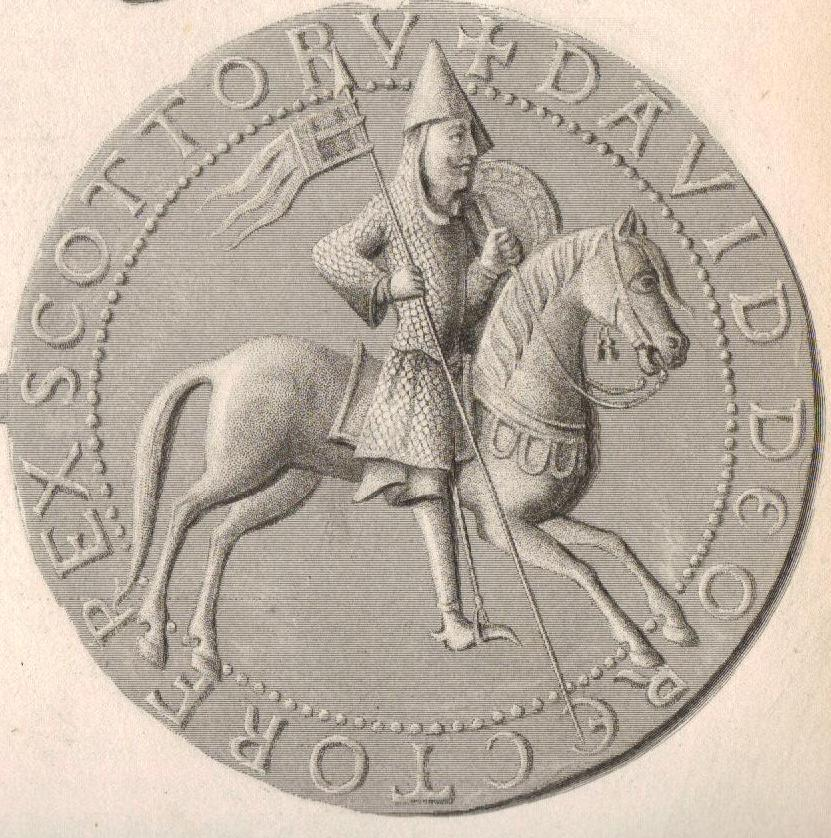
Steel engraving and enhancement of the reverse side of the Great Seal of David I, a picture in the Anglo-Continental style depicting David as a warrior leader.

The Battle of the Standard, as the encounter came to be called, was a defeat for the Scots. Afterwards, David and his surviving notables retired to Carlisle. Although the result was a defeat, it was not by any means decisive. David retained the bulk of his army and thus the power to go on the offensive again. The siege of Wark, for instance, which had been going on since January, continued until it was captured in November. David continued to occupy Cumberland as well as much of Northumberland.

On 26 September Cardinal Alberic, Bishop of Ostia, arrived at Carlisle where David had called together his kingdom's nobles, abbots and bishops. Alberic was there to investigate the controversy over the issue of the Bishop of Glasgow's allegiance or non-allegiance to the Archbishop of York. Alberic played the role of peace broker, and David agreed to a six-week truce, which excluded the siege of Wark. On 9 April, David and Stephen's wife Matilda of Boulogne (daughter of Mary of Scotland, and so another niece of David) met each other at Durham and agreed a settlement. David's son Henry was given the earldom of Northumberland and was restored to the earldom of Huntingdon and lordship of Doncaster; David himself was allowed to keep Carlisle and Cumberland. King Stephen was to retain possession of the strategically vital castles of Bamburgh and Newcastle. This effectively fulfilled all of David's war aims.

=== Arrival of Matilda and the renewal of conflict ===
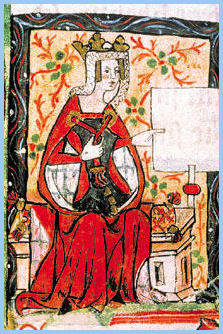
Matilda, former empress in Holy Roman Empire

The settlement with Stephen was not set to last long. The arrival in England of Empress Matilda allowed David to renew the conflict with Stephen. In either May or June, David travelled to the south of England and entered Matilda's company; he was present for her expected coronation at Westminster Abbey, though this never took place. David was there until September when the Empress found herself surrounded at Winchester.

This civil war, or "the Anarchy" as it was later called, enabled David to strengthen his own position in northern England. While David consolidated his hold on his own and his son's newly acquired lands, he also sought to expand his influence. The castles at Newcastle and Bamburgh were again brought under his control, attaining dominion over all of England north-west of the river Ribble and Pennines while holding the north-east as far south as the river Tyne, on the borders of the core territory of the bishopric of Durham. While his son brought all the senior barons of Northumberland into his entourage, David rebuilt the fortress of Carlisle. Carlisle quickly replaced Roxburgh as his favoured residence. David's acquisition of the mines at Alston on the South Tyne enabled him to begin minting the Kingdom of Scotland's first silver coinage. David, meanwhile, issued charters to Shrewsbury Abbey in respect to their lands in Lancashire.

=== Bishopric of Durham and the Archbishopric of York ===
However, David's successes were in many ways balanced by his failures. David's greatest disappointment during this time was his inability to ensure control of the Bishopric of Durham and the Archbishopric of York. David had attempted to appoint his chancellor, William Comyn, to the bishopric of Durham, which had been vacant since the death of Bishop Geoffrey Rufus in 1140. Between 1141 and 1143, Comyn was the de facto bishop, and had control of the bishop's castle; but he was resented by the chapter. Despite controlling the town of Durham, David's only hope of ensuring his election and consecration was gaining the support of the papal legate, Henry of Blois, Bishop of Winchester and brother of King Stephen. Despite obtaining the support of Empress Matilda, David was unsuccessful and had given up by the time William of St. Barbara was elected to the see in 1143.

David also attempted to interfere in the succession to the archbishopric of York. William FitzHerbert, nephew of King Stephen, found his position undermined by the collapsing political fortune of Stephen in the north of England and was deposed by the Pope. David used his Cistercian connections to build a bond with Henry Murdac, the new archbishop. Despite the support of Pope Eugene III, supporters of King Stephen and William FitzHerbert managed to prevent Henry taking up his post at York. In 1149, Henry sought the support of David. David seized on the opportunity to bring the archdiocese under his control and marched on the city. However, Stephen's supporters became aware of David's intentions and informed King Stephen. Stephen therefore marched to the city and installed a new garrison. David decided not to risk such an engagement and withdrew. Richard Oram has conjectured that David's ultimate aim was to bring the whole of the ancient Kingdom of Northumbria into his dominion. For Oram, this event was the turning point, "the chance to radically redraw the political map of the British Isles [had been] lost forever".

== Scottish Church ==
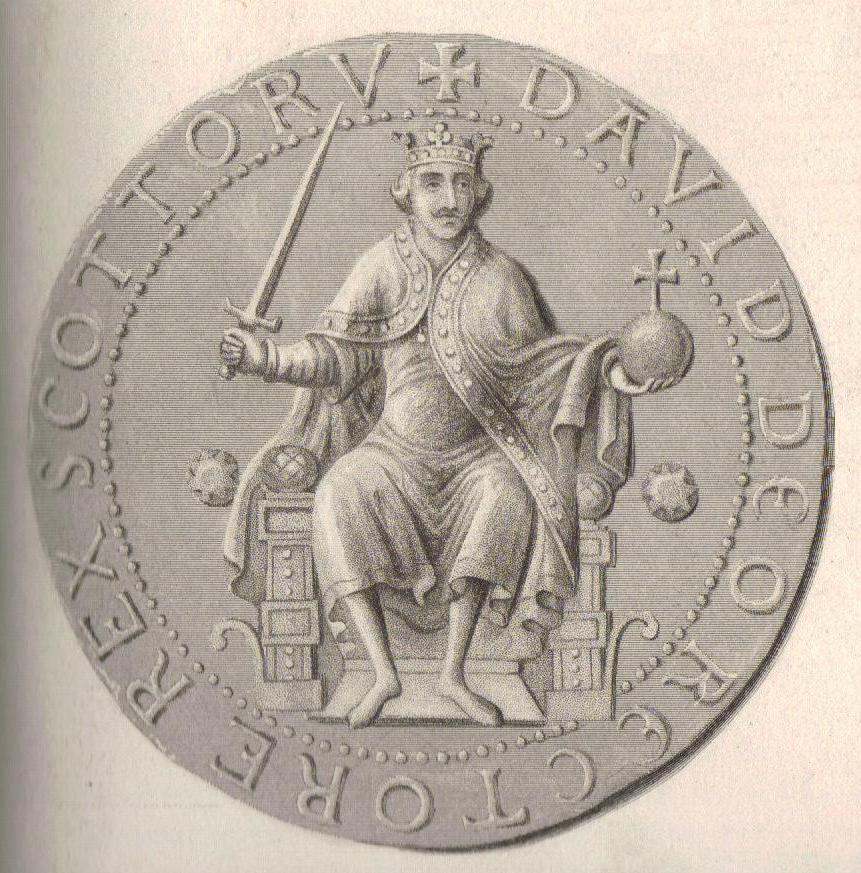
Steel engraving and enhancement of the obverse side of the Great Seal of David I, portraying David in the "Continental" fashion as the other-worldly maintainer of peace and defender of justice.

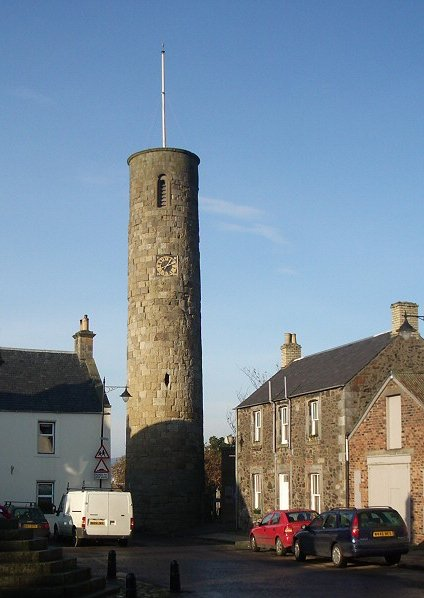
The round tower at Abernethy. Another such tower exists at Brechin Cathedral. They are one of the most conspicuous surviving traces of pre-Davidian Scottish church architecture.

Historical treatment of David I and the Scottish church usually acknowledges David's role as the defender of the Scottish church's independence from claims of overlordship by the Archbishop of York and the Archbishop of Canterbury.

=== Innovations in the church system ===
It was once held that Scotland's episcopal sees and entire parochial system owed its origins to the innovations of David I. Today, scholars have moderated this view. Aelred of Rievaulx wrote in David's eulogy that when David came to power, "he found three or four bishops in the whole Scottish kingdom [north of the Forth], and the others wavering without a pastor to the loss of both morals and property; when he died, he left nine, both of ancient bishoprics which he himself restored and new ones which he erected". Although David moved the bishopric of Mortlach east to Old Aberdeen, and arranged the creation of the diocese of Caithness, no other bishoprics can be safely called David's creation.

The bishopric of Glasgow was restored rather than resurrected. David appointed his reform-minded French chaplain John Capellanus to the bishopric and carried out an inquest, afterwards assigning to the bishopric all the lands of his principality, except those in the east which were already governed by the Bishop of St Andrews. David was at least partly responsible for forcing semi-monastic "bishoprics" like Brechin, Dunkeld, Mortlach (Aberdeen) and Dunblane to become fully episcopal and firmly integrated into a national diocesan system.

As for the development of the parochial system, David's traditional role as its creator can not be sustained. Scotland already had an ancient system of parish churches dating to the Early Middle Ages, and the kind of system introduced by David's Normanising tendencies can more accurately be seen as mild refashioning, rather than creation; he made the Scottish system as a whole more like that of France and England, but he did not create it.

=== Ecclesiastical disputes ===
One of the first problems David had to deal with as king was an ecclesiastical dispute with the English Church. The English Church's insistence on subordinating Scottish sees to the archbishops of York or Canterbury had, since his election in 1124, prevented Robert of Scone from being consecrated to the see of St Andrews (Cenn Ríghmonaidh). Since the 11th century, the bishopric of St Andrews likely functioned as a de facto archbishopric. The title of "Archbishop" is accorded in Scottish and Irish sources to Bishop Giric and Bishop Fothad II.

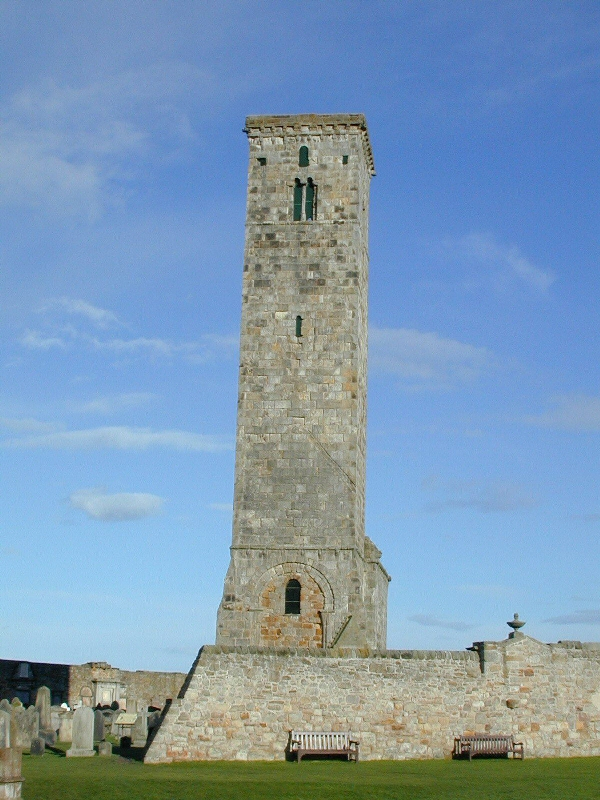
The tower of the church of St Riagal (Saint Regulus), at Cenn Ríghmonaidh, later named (St Andrews); this existed during David's reign.

The problem was that this archepiscopal status had not been cleared with the papacy, opening the way for English archbishops to claim the overlordship of the whole Scottish church. The man responsible was the new aggressively assertive Archbishop of York, Thurstan. His easiest target was the bishopric of Glasgow, which, being south of the river Forth, was not regarded as part of Scotland nor the jurisdiction of St Andrews. In 1125, Pope Honorius II wrote to John, Bishop of Glasgow, ordering him to submit to the archbishopric of York. David ordered Bishop John of Glasgow to travel to the Apostolic See in order to secure a pallium which would elevate the bishopric of St Andrews to an archbishopric with jurisdiction over Glasgow.

Thurstan travelled to Rome, as did the Archbishop of Canterbury, William de Corbeil, and both presumably opposed David's request. David however gained the support of King Henry, and the Archbishop of York agreed to a year's postponement of the issue and to consecrate Robert of Scone without making an issue of subordination. York's claim over bishops north of the Forth was in practice abandoned for the rest of David's reign, although York maintained her more credible claims over Glasgow.

In 1151, David again requested a pallium for the Archbishop of St Andrews. Cardinal John Paparo met David at his residence in Carlisle in September 1151. Tantalisingly for David, the Cardinal was on his way to Ireland with four pallia to create four new Irish archbishoprics. When the Cardinal returned to Carlisle, David made the request. In David's plan, the new archdiocese would include all the bishoprics in David's Scottish territory, as well as bishopric of Orkney and the bishopric of the Isles. Unfortunately for David, the Cardinal does not appear to have brought the issue up with the papacy. In the following year, the papacy dealt David another blow by creating the archbishopric of Trondheim, a new Norwegian archbishopric embracing the bishoprics of the Isles and Orkney.

== Succession and death ==
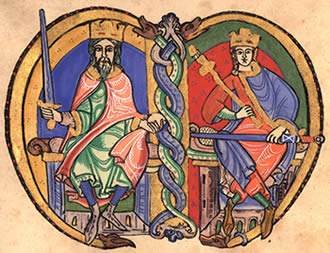
David alongside his designated successor, Máel Coluim mac Eanric. Máel Coluim IV would reign for twelve years, in a reign marked for the young king's chastity and religious fervour.

Perhaps the greatest blow to David's plans came on 12 July 1152 when Henry, Earl of Northumberland, David's heir, died. He had probably been suffering from some kind of illness for a long time. David had under a year to live, and he may have known that he was not going to be alive much longer. David quickly arranged for his grandson Malcolm IV to be made his successor, and for his younger grandson William to be made Earl of Northumberland. Donnchad I, Mormaer of Fife, the senior magnate in Scotland-proper, was appointed as rector, or regent, and took the 11-year-old Malcolm around Scotland-proper on a tour to meet and gain the homage of his future Gaelic subjects. David's health began to fail seriously in the spring of 1153, and on 24 May 1153, David died in Carlisle Castle. In his obituary in the Annals of Tigernach, he is called Dabíd mac Mail Colaim, rí Alban & Saxan, "David, son of Malcolm, King of Scotland and England", a title which acknowledged the importance of the new English part of David's realm. He was buried before the high altar Dunfermline Abbey in early June.

== Veneration ==
David I is recognised as a saint by the Roman Catholic Church, with a feast day of 24 May, though it appears that he was never formally canonised. There are churches in Scotland which have him as their patron. His mother Saint Margaret of Scotland was canonised in 1249.

== Historiography ==
=== Medieval reputation ===
The earliest English assessments of David portray him as a pious king, a reformer and a civilising agent in a barbarian nation. For William of Newburgh, David was a "King not barbarous of a barbarous nation", who "wisely tempered the fierceness of his barbarous nation". William praises David for his piety, noting that, among other saintly activities, "he was frequent in washing the feet of the poor" (this can be read literally: his mother, who is now patron saint of Scotland, was widely known and lauded for the same practice). Another of David's eulogists, his former courtier Aelred of Rievaulx, echoes Newburgh's assertions and praises David for his justice as well as his piety, commenting that David's rule of the Scots meant that "the whole barbarity of that nation was softened ... as if forgetting their natural fierceness they submitted their necks to the laws which the royal gentleness dictated".

Although avoiding stress on 12th-century Scottish "barbarity", the Lowland Scottish historians of the Late Middle Ages tend to repeat the accounts of earlier chronicle tradition. Much that was written was either directly transcribed from the earlier medieval chronicles themselves or was modelled closely upon them, even in the significant works of John of Fordun, Andrew Wyntoun and Walter Bower. For example, Bower includes in his text the eulogy written for David by Aelred of Rievaulx. This quotation extends to over twenty pages in the modern edition and exerted a great deal of influence over what became the traditional view of David in later works about Scottish history. Historical treatment of David developed in the writings of later Scottish historians, and the writings of men like John Mair, George Buchanan, Hector Boece, and Bishop John Leslie ensured that by the 18th century, a picture of David as a pious, justice-loving state-builder and vigorous maintainer of Scottish independence had emerged.

Moreover, Bower stated in his eulogy that David always had the ambition to join a crusade, which was prevented eventually by his death. In addition, Aelred of Rievaulx hinted that David expressed his desire to be part of the Second Crusade himself, but he was dissuaded by his subjects. However, David had already met Hugues de Payens, the first Grand Master of the Knights Templar, in 1128 in Scotland. In the meantime, the Order established a seat at Balantrodoch, now Temple, Midlothian on the South Esk (River Esk, Lothian).

=== Modern treatment ===
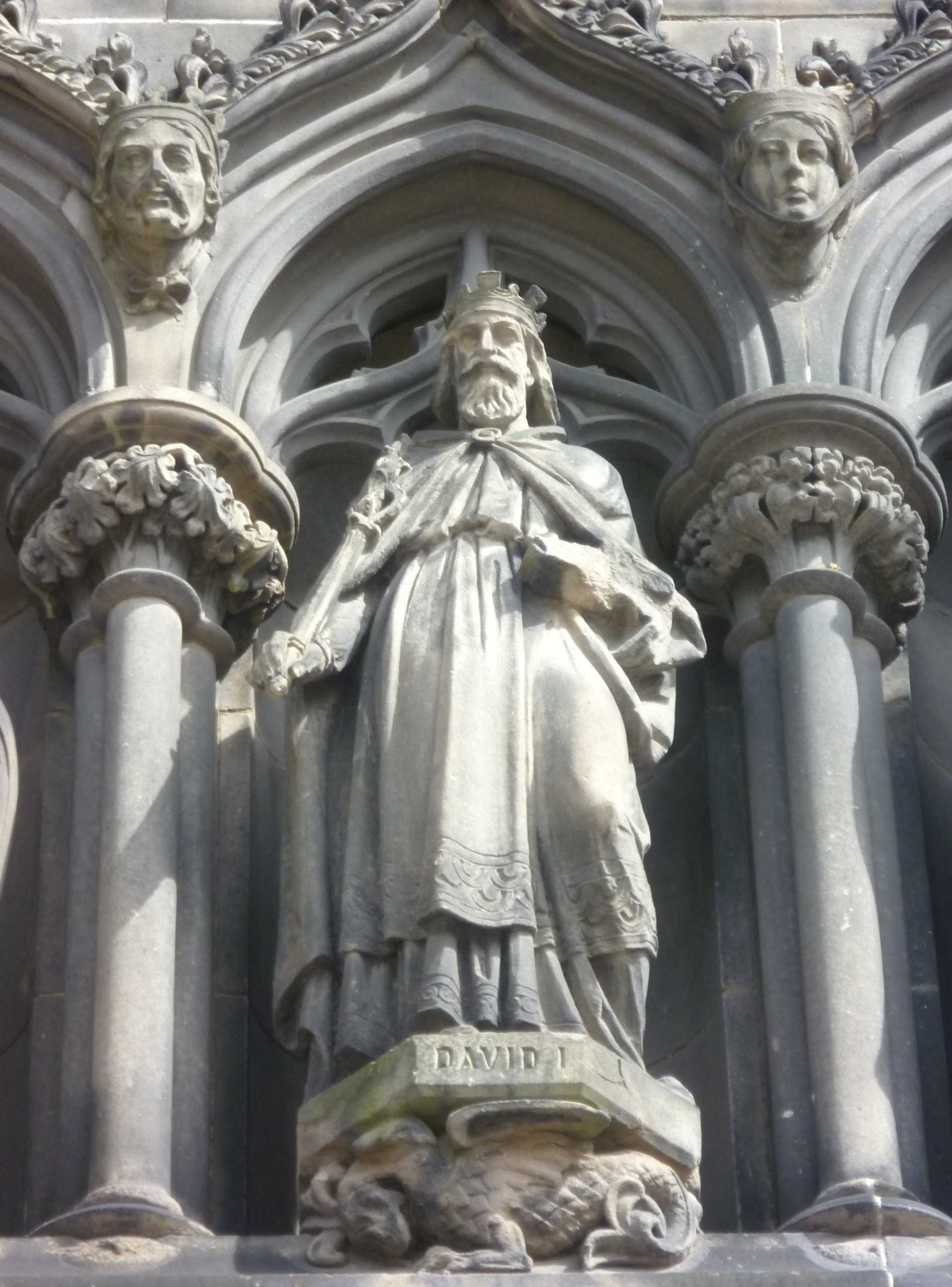
Statue of David I on the West Door of St. Giles High Kirk, Edinburgh

In the modern period, there has been more of an emphasis on David's state-building and the effects of his changes on Scottish cultural development. Lowland Scots tended to trace the origins of their culture to the marriage of David's father Máel Coluim III to Saint Margaret of Scotland, a myth which had its origins in the medieval period. With the development of modern historical techniques in the mid-19th century, responsibility for these developments appeared to lie more with David than his father. David assumed a principal place in the alleged destruction of the Celtic Kingdom of Scotland, Andrew Lang, in 1900, wrote that "with Alexander [I], Celtic domination ends; with David, Norman and English dominance is established".

The ages of Enlightenment and Romanticism had elevated the role of races and "ethnic packages" into mainstream history, and in this context David was portrayed as hostile to the native Scots, and his reforms were seen in the light of natural, perhaps even justified, civilised Teutonic aggression towards the backward Celts.

In the 20th century, several studies were devoted to Normanisation in 12th century Scotland, focusing upon and thereby emphasising the changes brought about by the reign of David I. Græme Ritchie's The Normans in Scotland (1954), Archie Duncan's Scotland: The Making of the Kingdom (1974) and the many articles of G. W. S. Barrow all formed part of this historiographical trend.

In the 1980s, Barrow sought a compromise between change and continuity, and argued that the reign of King David was, in fact, a "Balance of New and Old". Such a conclusion was a natural incorporation of an underlying current in Scottish historiography which, since William F. Skene's monumental and revolutionary three-volume Celtic Scotland: A History of Ancient Alban (1876–1880), had been forced to acknowledge that "Celtic Scotland" was alive and healthy for a long time after the reign of David I. Michael Lynch followed and built upon Barrow's compromise solution, arguing that as David's reign progressed, his kingship became more Celtic. Despite its subtitle, in 2004 in the only full-volume study of David I's reign yet produced, David I: The King Who Made Scotland, its author Richard Oram further builds upon Lynch's picture, stressing continuity while placing the changes of David's reign in their context.

== Davidian Revolution ==
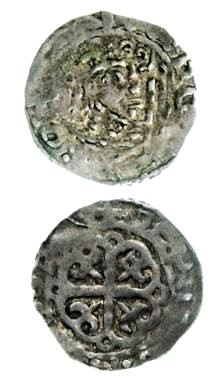
Silver penny of David I.

However, while there may be debate about the importance or extent of the historical change in David I's era, no historian doubts that it was taking place. The reason is what Barrow and Lynch both call the "Davidian Revolution". David's "revolution" is held to underpin the development of later medieval Scotland, whereby the changes he inaugurated grew into most of the central institutions of the later medieval kingdom.

Since Robert Bartlett's pioneering work, The Making of Europe: Conquest, Colonization and Cultural Change, 950–1350 (1993), reinforced by Moore's The First European Revolution, c. 970–1215 (2000), it has become increasingly apparent that better understanding of David's "revolution" can be achieved by recognising the wider "European revolution" taking place during this period. The central idea is that from the late 10th century onwards the culture and institutions of the old Carolingian heartlands in northern France and western Germany were spreading to outlying areas, creating a more recognisable "Europe". Scotland was just one of many "outlying" areas.

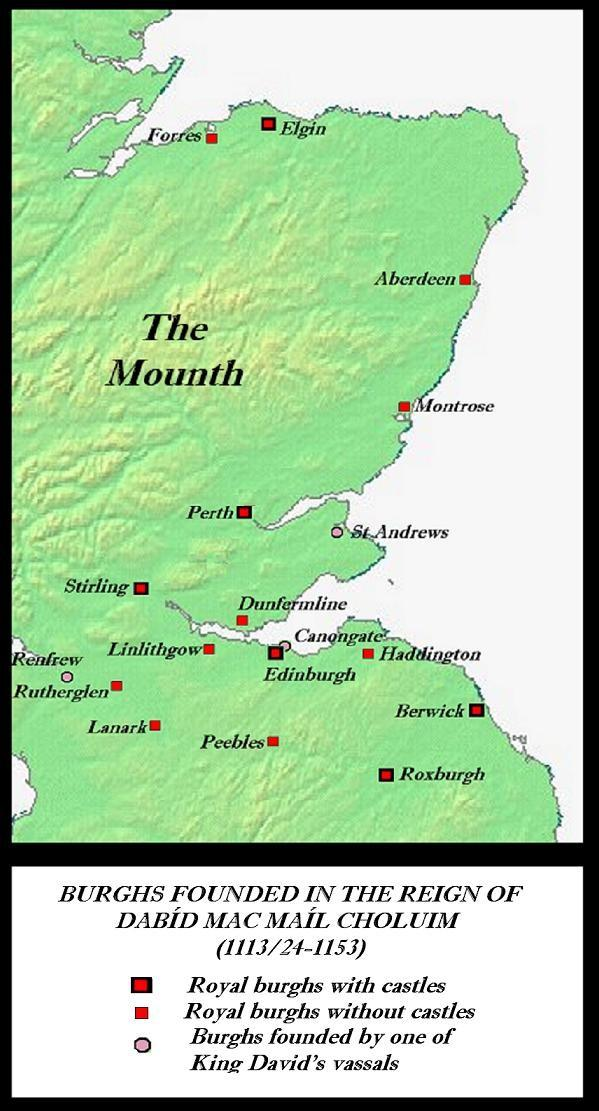
Burghs established in Scotland before the accession of David's successor and grandson, Máel Coluim IV; these were Scotland's first towns.

=== Government and feudalism ===
The widespread enfeoffment of foreign knights and the processes by which land ownership was converted from customary tenures into feudal, or otherwise legally defined relationships, would revolutionise the way the Kingdom of Scotland was governed, as did the dispersal and installation of royal agents in the new mottes that were proliferating throughout the realm to staff newly created sheriffdoms and judiciaries for the twin purposes of law enforcement and taxation, bringing Scotland further into the "continental" model.

Scotland in this period experienced innovations in governmental practices and the importation of foreign, mostly French, knights. It is to David's reign that the beginnings of feudalism are generally assigned. This is defined as "castle-building, the regular use of professional cavalry, the knight's fee" as well as "homage and fealty". David established large-scale feudal lordships in the west of his Cumbrian principality for the leading members of the French military entourage who kept him in power. Additionally, many smaller-scale feudal lordships were created.

Steps were taken during David's reign to make the government of that part of Scotland he administered more like the government of Anglo-Norman England. New sheriffdoms enabled the King to effectively administer royal demesne land. During his reign, royal sheriffs were established in the king's core personal territories; namely, in rough chronological order, at Roxburgh, Scone, Berwick-upon-Tweed, Stirling and Perth. The Justiciarship too was created in David's reign. Although this institution had Anglo-Norman origins, in Scotland north of the Forth at least, it represented some form of continuity with an older office.

=== Economy ===
The revenue of his English earldom and the proceeds of the silver mines at Alston allowed David to produce Scotland's first coinage. These altered the nature of trade and transformed his political image.

David was a great town builder. As Prince of the Cumbrians, David founded the first two burghs of "Scotland", at Roxburgh and Berwick. Burghs were settlements with defined boundaries and guaranteed trading rights, locations where the king could collect and sell the products of his cain and conveth (a payment made in lieu of providing the king hospitality). David founded around 15 burghs.

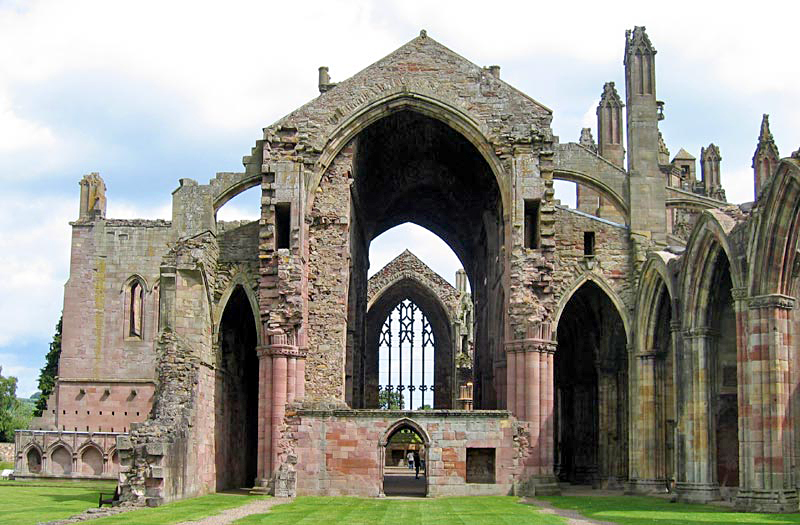
The ruins of Melrose Abbey. Founded in 1137, this Cistercian monastery became one of David's greatest legacies.

Perhaps nothing in David's reign compares in importance to burghs. While they could not, at first, have amounted to much more than the nucleus of an immigrant merchant class, nothing would do more to reshape the long-term economic and ethnic shape of Scotland than the burgh. These planned towns were or dominated by English in culture and language; William of Newburgh wrote in the reign of William the Lion, that "the towns and burghs of the Scottish realm are known to be inhabited by English"; as well as transforming the economy, the dominance of an English influence would in the long term undermine the position of the Middle Irish language, giving birth to the idea of the Scottish Lowlands.

=== Monastic patronage ===
David was one of medieval Scotland's greatest monastic patrons. In 1113, in perhaps David's first act as Prince of the Cumbrians, he founded Selkirk Abbey for the Tironensians. David founded more than a dozen new monasteries in his reign, patronising various new monastic orders.

Not only were such monasteries an expression of David's undoubted piety, they also functioned to transform Scottish society. Monasteries became centres of foreign influence and provided sources of literate men, able to serve the crown's growing administrative needs. These new monasteries, the Cistercian ones in particular, introduced new agricultural practices. Cistercian labour, for instance, transformed southern Scotland into one of northern Europe's most important sources of sheep wool.

== Family tree ==
David's relationship with the kings of Scotland and England

Æthelred the Unready
Edmund Ironside	Edward the Confessor	Robert I, Duke of Normandy
Duncan I of Scotland	Agatha	Edward the Exile	William I of England	Adelaide of Normandy
Ingibiorg Finnsdottir	Malcolm III of Scotland	Margaret of Wessex	Judith of Lens	Waltheof of Northumbria
Duncan II of Scotland	Donald	Edward	Edmund	Ethelred	Edgar of Scotland	Edith	Henry I of England	Mary	Alexander I of Scotland	David I of Scotland	Maud of Huntingdon	Simon de Senlis
William fitz Duncan	William Adelin	Empress Matilda	Matilda I of Boulogne	Stephen of England	Malcolm	Henry
Henry II of England	Malcolm IV of Scotland	William I of Scotland	David

== Fictional portrayals ==
- David the Prince (1980) by Nigel Tranter. The story of Queen Margaret's sons Alexander I and David I.

David I of Scotland House of Dunkeld Born: c. 1084 Died: 24 May 1153
Regnal titles
Preceded by Alexander I	King of Alba; 1124–1153	Succeeded by Malcolm IV
Preceded by Simon I de Senlis	Earl of Huntingdon; 1111/1113–1130	Succeeded by Henry of Scotland
