= Máel Coluim mac Alaxandair =

Pretender to the Scottish throne

Máel Coluim mac Alaxandair (Note: This is the medieval Gaelic version of his name; in modern Gaelic he would be "Máel Coluim mac Alasdair", and in English he would be "Malcolm son of Alexander".) (fl. 1124–1134) was an illegitimate son of Alexander I of Scotland, and was an unsuccessful pretender to the Scottish throne. He is a relatively obscure figure owing primarily to the scarcity of source material, appearing only in pro-David English sources, which label him a "bastard".

When Alexander I died in 1124, Máel Coluim's uncle David I came to the throne with the help of King Henry I of England and David's own Norman retainers. Orderic Vitalis reports that Máel Coluim mac Alaxandair "affected to snatch the kingdom from [David], and fought against him two sufficiently fierce battles; but David, who was loftier in understanding and in power and wealth, conquered him and his followers".

Máel Coluim's war against David and Henry may have involved the death of David's eldest son. Before recounting the war against Máel Coluim, Orderic Vitalis reported the death of this son at the hands of an exiled Norwegian priest; but Orderic's account is so obscure that it is difficult to make anything of it. The priest was reportedly a member of David's household, and was put to death by being bound to the tails of four horses. Whether or not the two events were connected, Máel Coluim escaped unharmed into areas of Scotland not yet under David's control, and there gained shelter and some measure of support; when Máel Coluim mac Alaxandair renewed his claim to the throne six years later, he had the support and protection of the king of Moray.

In 1130, Máel Coluim enters the scant sources once more. Máel Coluim now had the backing of Óengus of Moray. King Óengus was David's most powerful "vassal", a man who, as grandson of King Lulach of Scotland, even had his own claim to the kingdom. Máel Coluim and Óengus' forces had advanced into Angus when they were met by David's Mercian constable, Edward; the ensuing Battle of Stracathro took place near Brechin. According to the Annals of Ulster, 1000 of Edward's army, and 4000 of Óengus' army, including Óengus himself, died. According to Orderic Vitalis, Edward followed up the killing of Óengus by marching north into Moray itself, which, in his words, "lacked a defender and lord"; and so Edward, "with God's help obtained the entire duchy of that extensive district". However, this was far from the end of it. Máel Coluim again escaped, and four years of this continuing Scottish "civil war" followed; for David this period was quite simply a "struggle for survival".

It appears that David applied for and obtained extensive military aid from his patron, King Henry. Ailred of Rievaulx relates that at this point a large fleet and a large army of Norman knights, including Walter l'Espec, and were sent by Henry to Carlisle to assist in David's attempt to root out his Scottish enemies. The fleet seems to have been used in the Irish Sea, the Firth of Clyde and the entire Argyll coast, where Máel Coluim was probably at large among supporters. By 1134 Máel Coluim was captured and imprisoned in Roxburgh Castle.

Máel Coluim's eventual fate is unknown. He was, and to a large extent still is, confused with Máel Coluim mac Áeda, son of Áed, later Mormaer of Ross.
