= St Oran's Chapel =

Chapel in Argyll and Bute, Scotland

Coordinates: 56.3344°N 6.3929°W

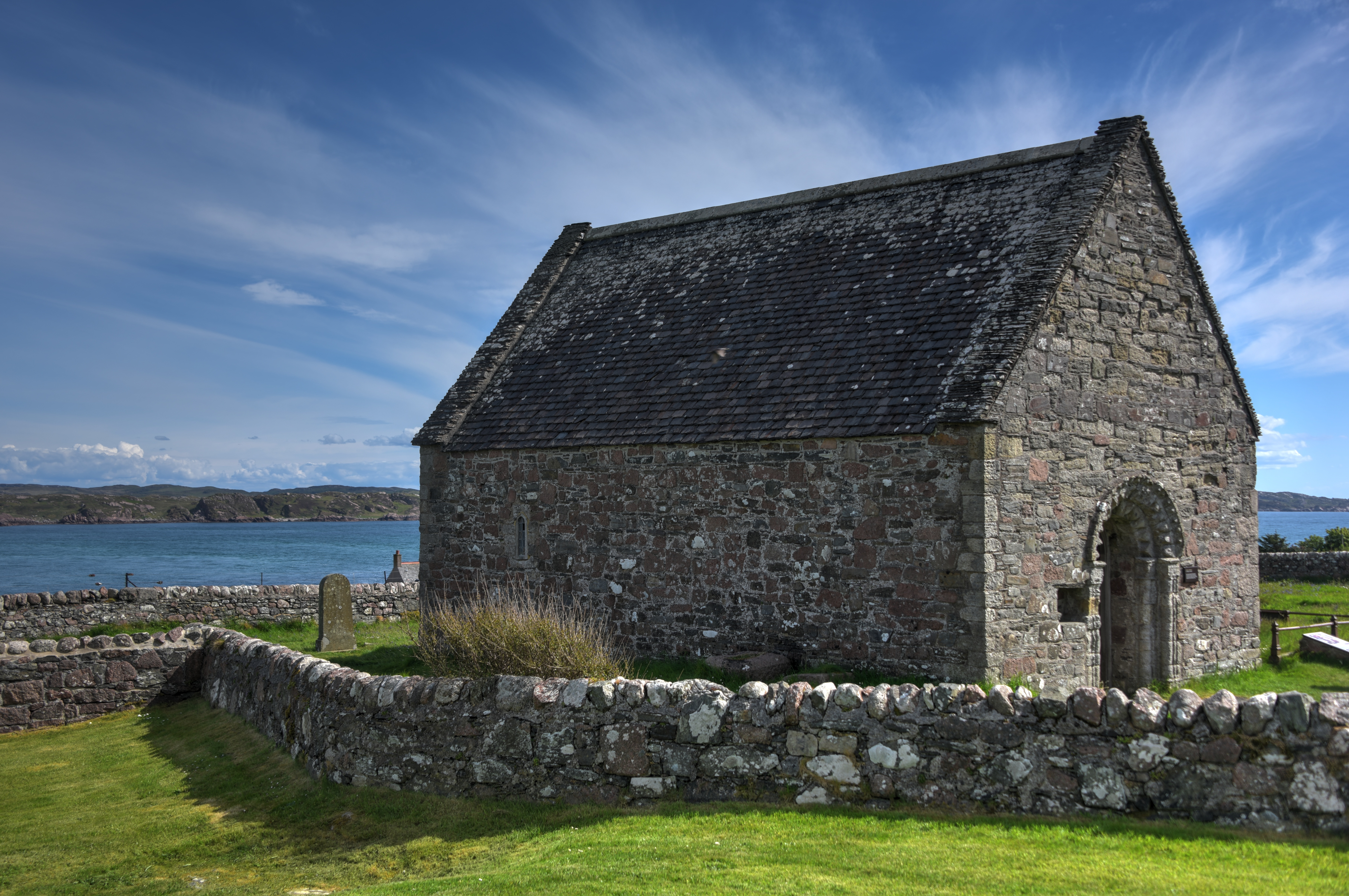
St Oran's Chapel

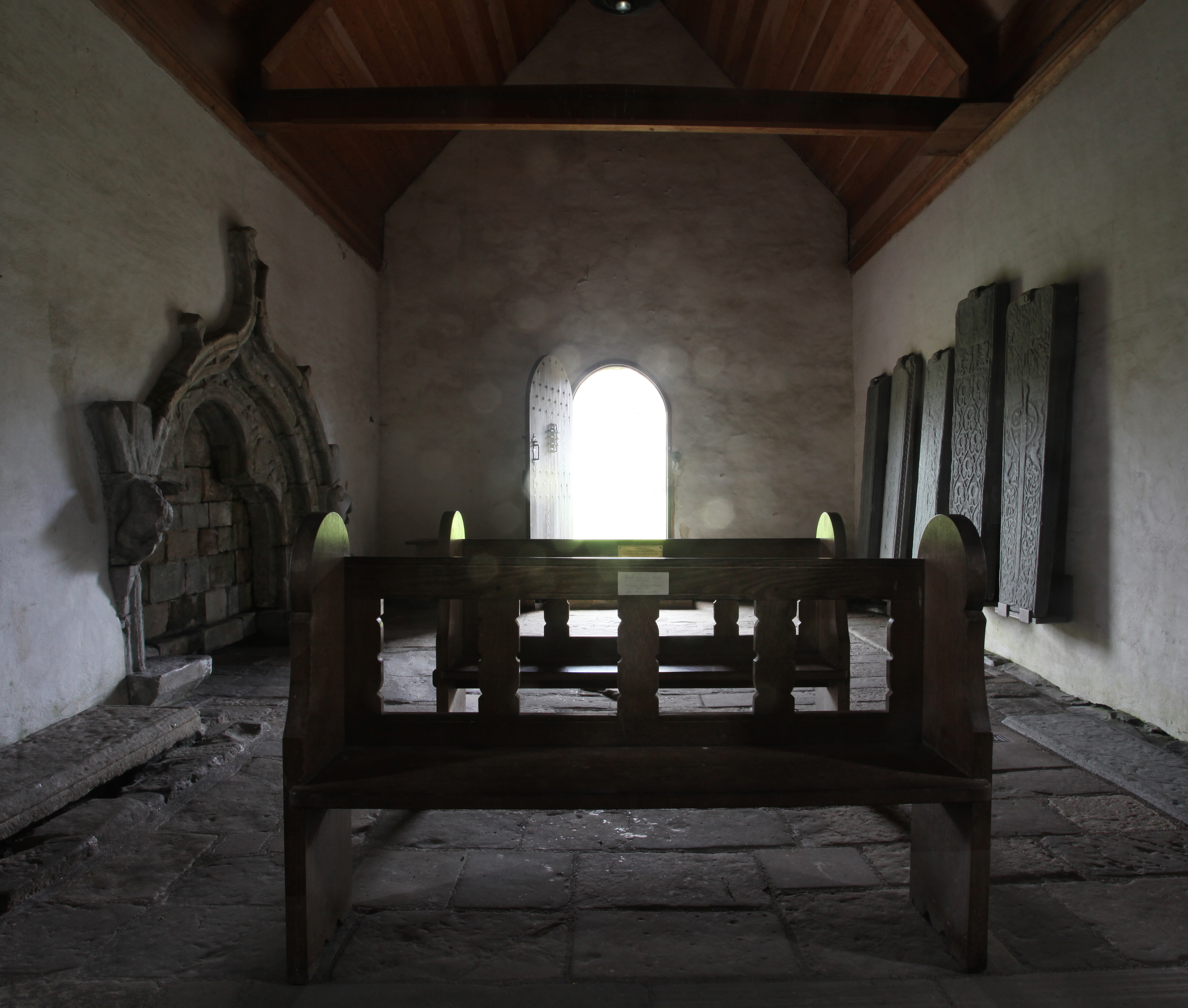
St Oran's Chapel - interior

St Oran's Chapel (Odhráin/Orain/Odran) is a medieval chapel located on the island of Iona in the Inner Hebrides off the west coast of Scotland. Built in the 12th century, the chapel was dedicated to St Oran. St Oran's Chapel was in ruins until it was restored at the same time as Iona Abbey. The chapel is protected as a part of the Iona monastic settlement scheduled monument.

== Burial ground ==
The burial ground surrounding the chapel is known as Reilig Òdhrain.
