= Holyrood Abbey =

Architectural structure in Edinburgh

Coordinates: 55°57′11″N 3°10′18″W

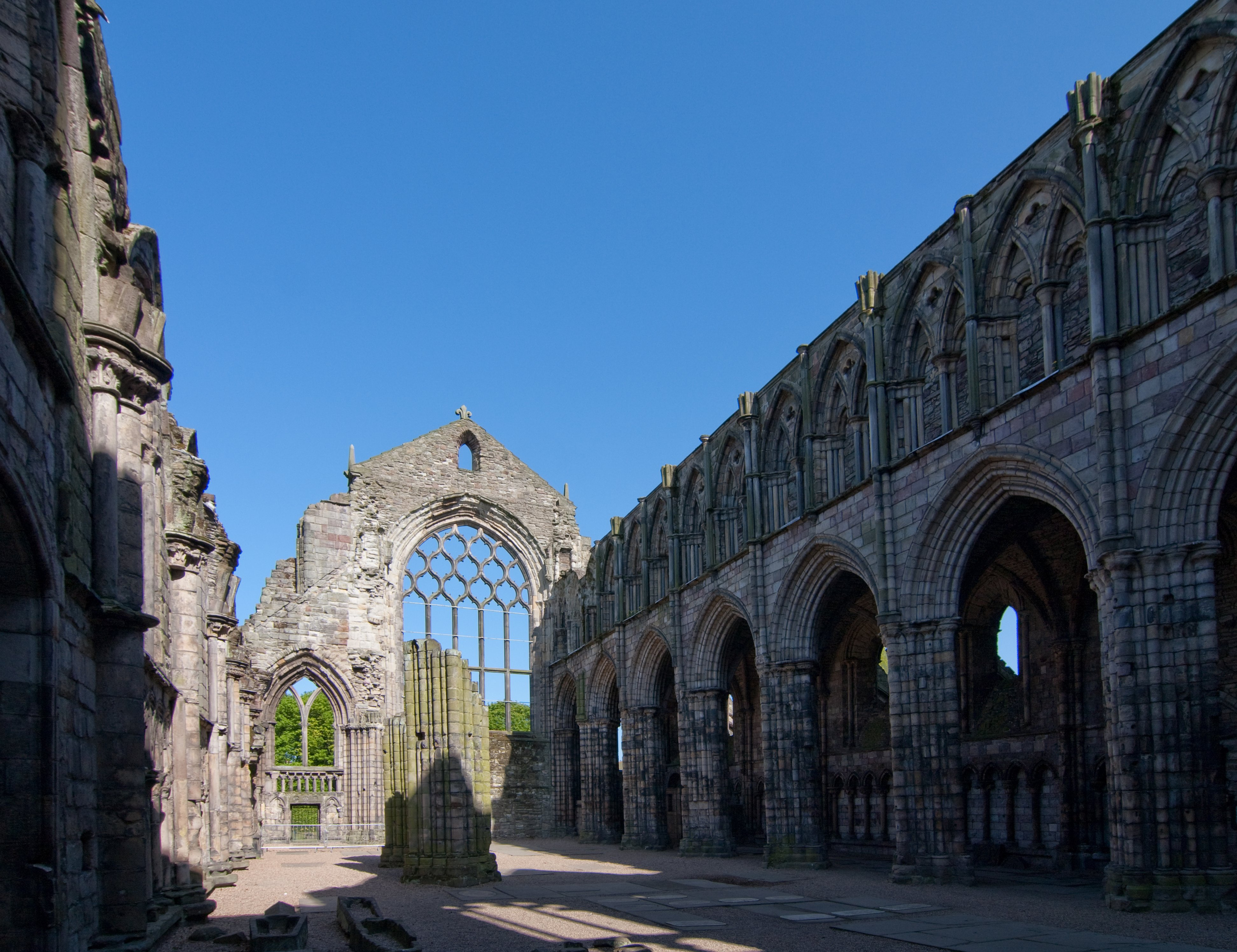
The ruins of Holyrood Abbey

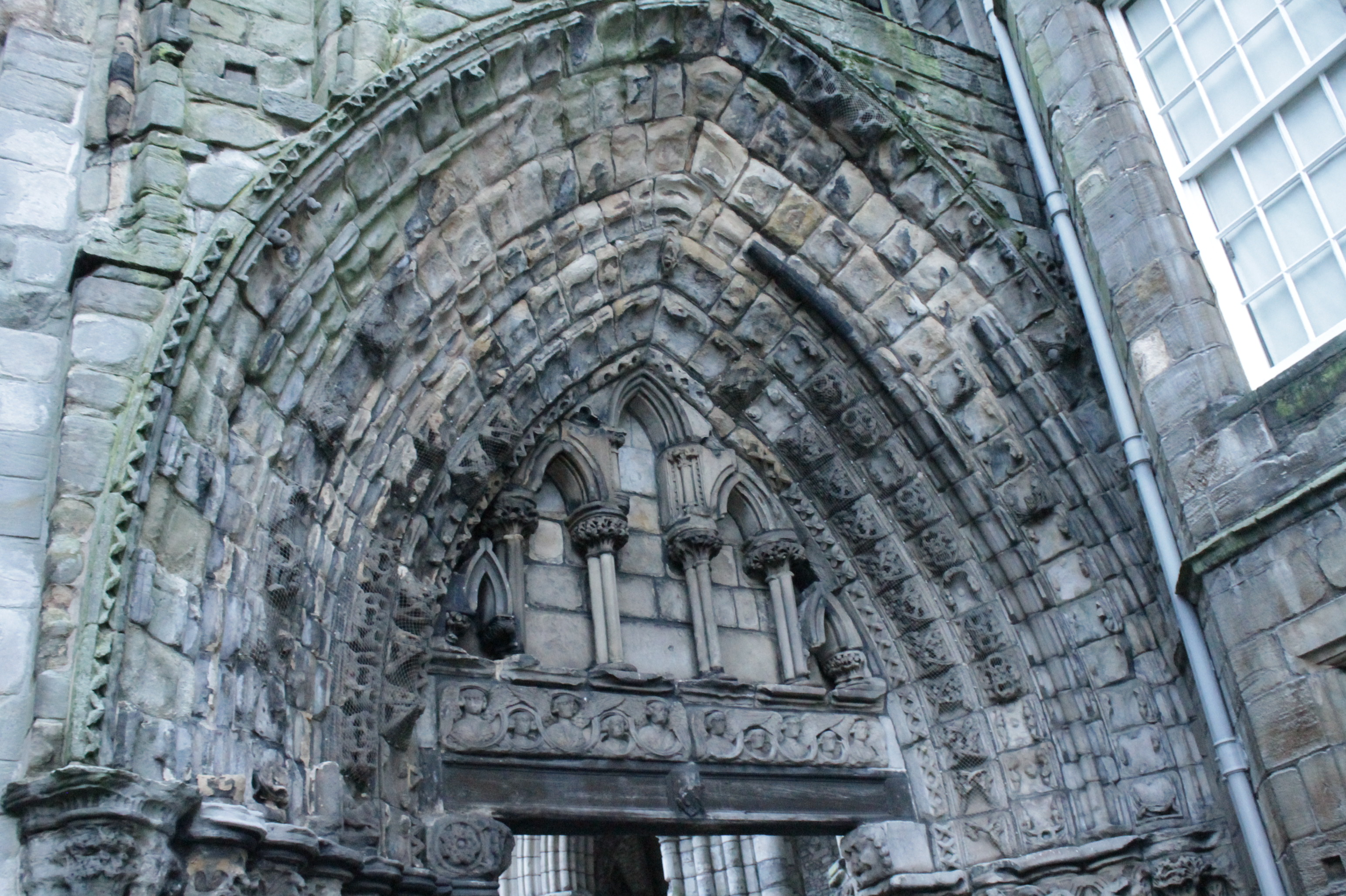
Main west door (detail) Holyrood Abbey

Holyrood Abbey is a ruined abbey of the Canons Regular in Edinburgh, Scotland. The abbey was founded in 1128 by David I of Scotland. During the 15th century, the abbey guesthouse was developed into a royal residence, and after the Scottish Reformation the Palace of Holyroodhouse was expanded further. The abbey church was used as a parish church until the 17th century, and has been ruined since the 18th century. The remaining walls of the abbey lie adjacent to the palace, at the eastern end of Edinburgh's Royal Mile. The site of the abbey is protected as a scheduled monument.

== Etymology of name ==
Rood is a word for the cross on which Jesus Christ was crucified; thus the name Holyrood is equivalent to "Holy Cross".

== History ==
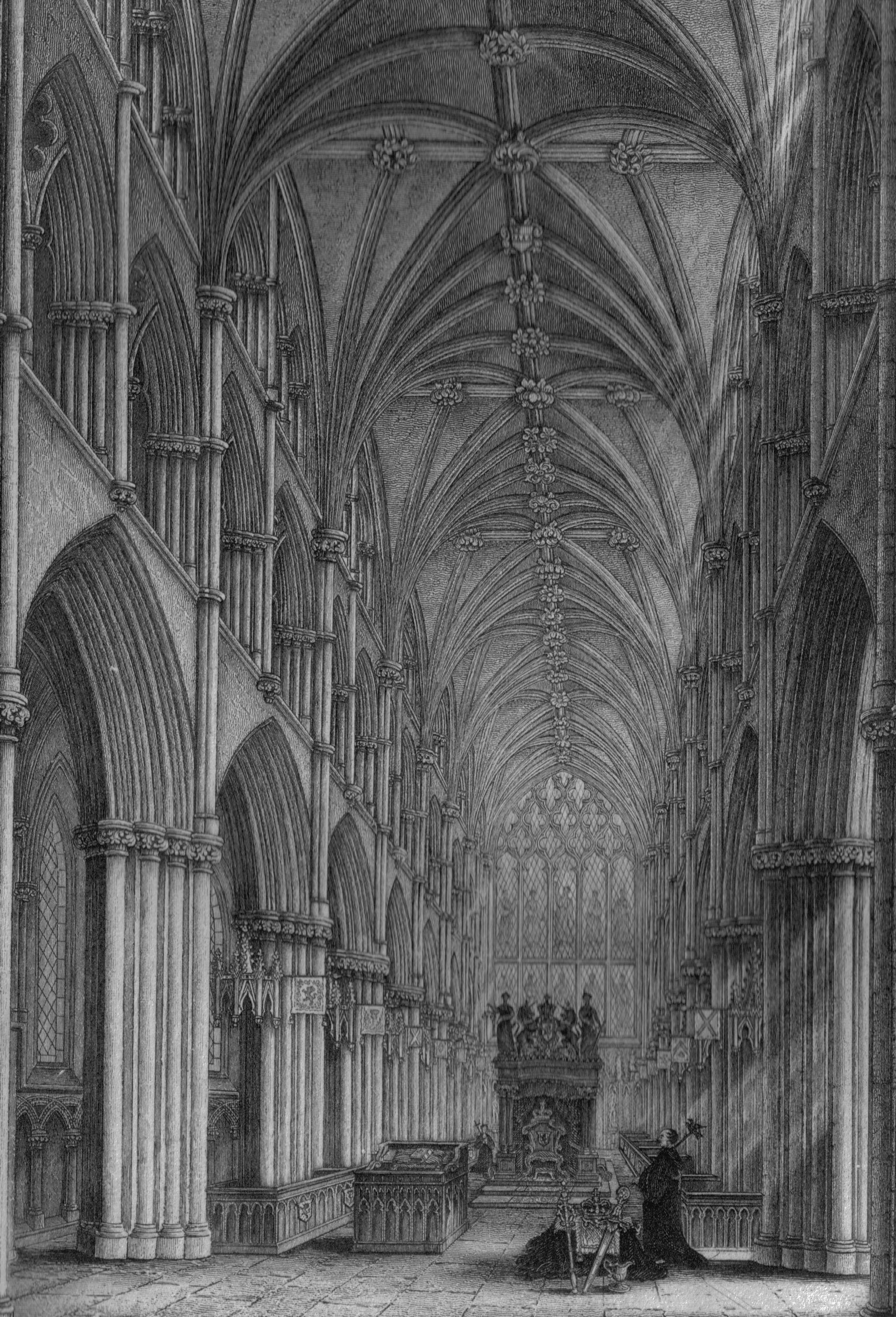
The Chapel Royal at the time of James VII

Legend relates that in 1127, while King David I was hunting in the forests to the east of Edinburgh during the Feast of the Cross, he was thrown from his horse after it had been startled by a hart. According to variations of the story, the king was saved from being gored by the charging animal when it was startled either by the miraculous appearance of a holy cross descending from the skies, or by sunlight reflected from a crucifix which suddenly appeared between the hart's antlers while the king attempted to grasp them in self-defence. As an act of thanksgiving for his escape, David I founded Holyrood Abbey on the site in 1128.

In the church was preserved, in a golden reliquary, an object said to be a fragment of the True Cross brought by David's mother, St. Margaret, from Waltham Abbey, and known thereafter as the Black Rood of Scotland (the Holyrood (cross)). At the battle of Neville's Cross, in 1346, this precious relic fell into the hands of the English, and it was placed in Durham Cathedral, from where it disappeared at the Reformation.

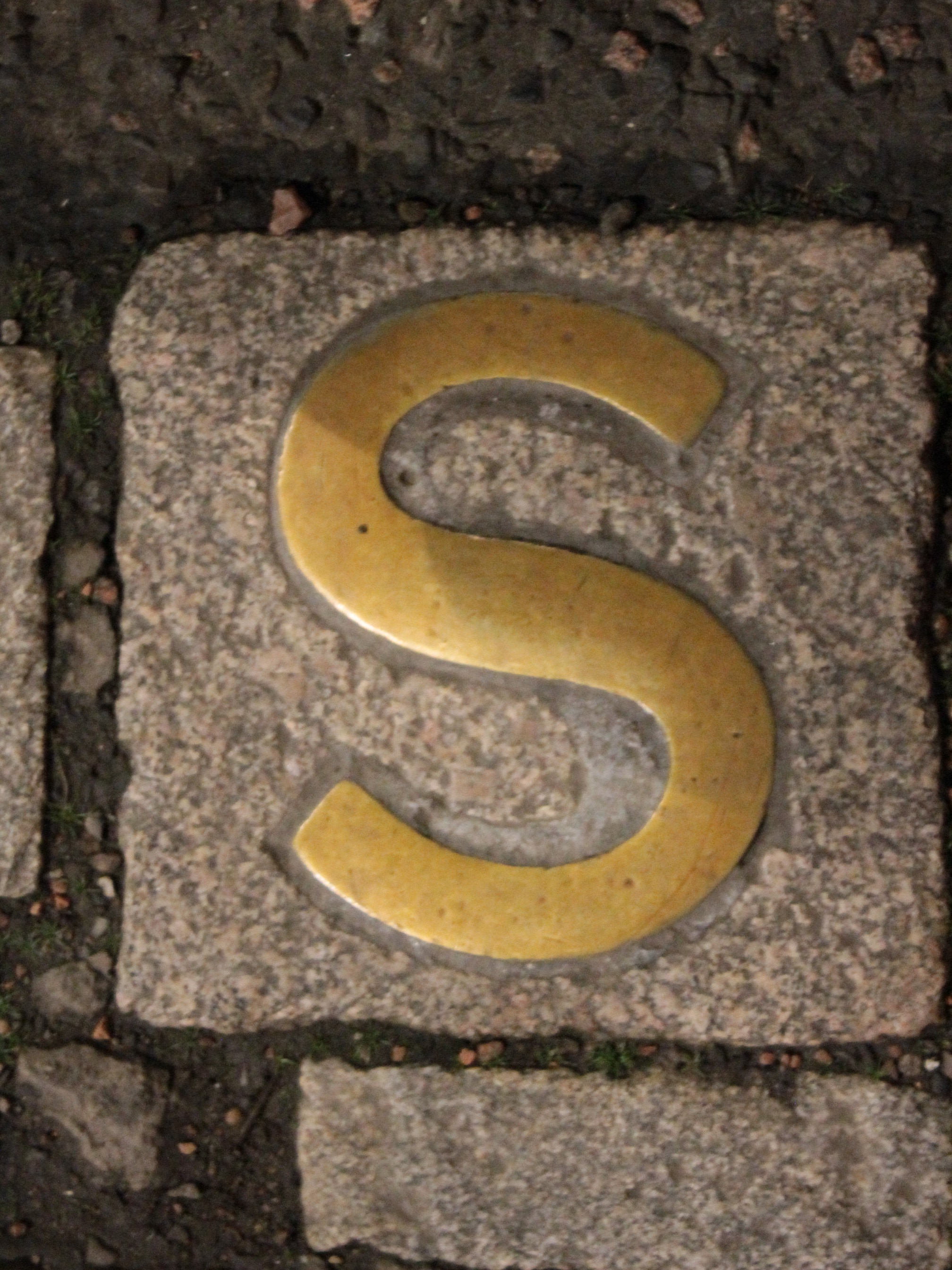
Sanctuary marker for Holyrood Abbey, Royal Mile, Edinburgh

The abbey was originally served by a community of Augustinian Canons Regular from Merton Priory. The layout of the original church at Holyrood, now known only from excavations, probably came from the 1125 church at the priory. Royal grants of fuel wood to the abbey in 1128 and 1150 probably reflected a lack of woodland resources locally. In 1177 the papal legate Vivian held council here. In 1189 the nobles and prelates of Scotland met here to discuss raising a ransom for William the Lion.

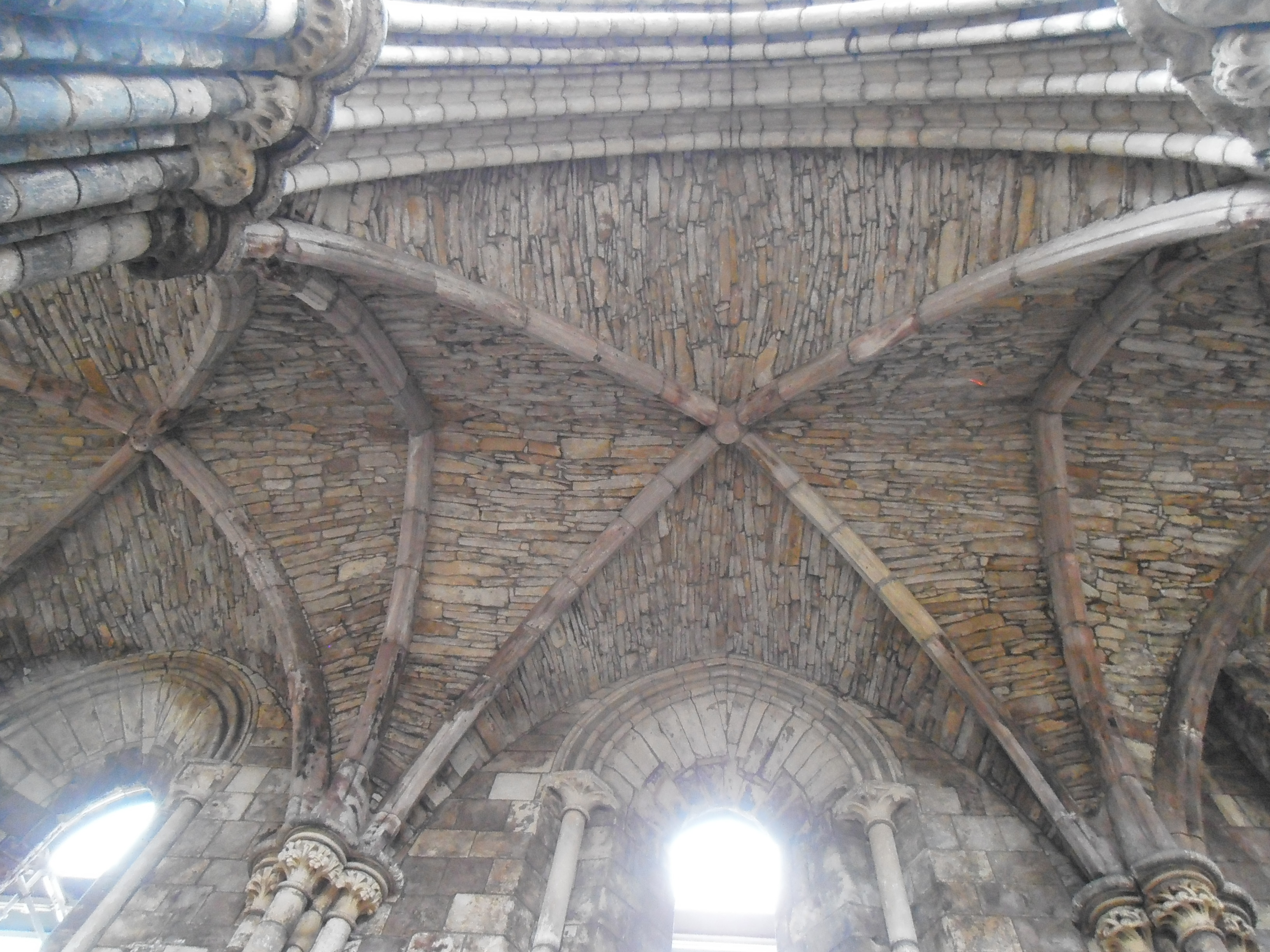
The aisle vault of the 4th bay, showing the rough quality of the construction.

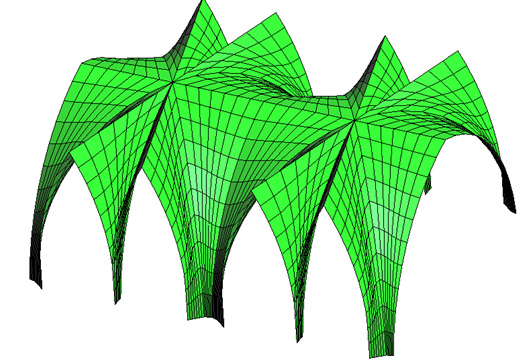
A structural model for the Finite Element analysis of the hypothesis of sexpartite vaults in Holyrood Abbey

The original abbey church of Holyrood was largely reconstructed between 1195 and 1230. The completed building consisted of a six-bay aisled choir, three-bay transepts with a central tower above, and an eight-bay aisled nave with twin towers at its west front. Some scholars believe the high vaults to be sexpartite (though this is not clearly supported by the 17th century illustrations of the interior). Such a design was probably archaic in that period, and difficult to execute or maintain. Evidence of the construction qualities of the stonemasons has remained on the S aisle vaults, which are set on an almost square plan of 4.4 m (14 feet), but built relatively roughly, with thin flagstones and not much attention to keeping the vertices straight. They were probably plastered, with exposed thin ribs.

Among the chief benefactors of Holyrood during the four centuries of its existence as a religious house were Kings David I and II; Robert, Bishop of St. Andrews; and Fergus of Galloway. The church of Kirkbride in Nithsdale was granted to the monks of Holyrood during the reign of Alexander II. A land dispute with Enguerrand Balliol, lord of Urr, led to Abbot Elias (1227-36) and his canons travelling to Galloway to undertake a perambulation of the boundaries of their holding in the company of Enguerrand's knights.

Around the abbey was a five-mile area of sanctuary, taking in much of Holyrood Park, where debtors and those accused of crimes could appeal to the Bailie of Holyroodhouse for protection. Brass sanctuary stones mark the boundary of the sanctuary on the Royal Mile. Those granted sanctuary would be given lodgings in the buildings around the abbey and obtained the nickname 'Abbey Lairds'.

The Parliament of Scotland met at the abbey in 1256, 1285, 1327, 1366, 1384, 1389 and 1410. In 1326, Robert the Bruce held parliament here, and there is evidence that Holyrood was being used as a royal residence by 1329. The Treaty of Edinburgh–Northampton (1328), which ended the First War of Scottish Independence, was signed by Robert I in the "King's Chamber" at Holyrood in March 1328. The abbey's position close to Edinburgh Castle meant that it was often visited by Scotland's kings, who were lodged in the guest house situated to the west of the abbey cloister. In the mid-15th century, with the emergence of Edinburgh as the main seat of the royal court and the chief city in the kingdom, the Kings of Scots increasingly used the accommodation at Holyrood for secular purposes. James II and his twin brother Alexander, Duke of Rothesay, were born there in October 1430. James was also crowned at Holyrood in 1437 and building works were carried out before his marriage there in 1449.

Between 1498 and 1501, James IV constructed a royal palace at Holyrood, adjacent to the abbey cloister. The Abbey refectory was converted into a Great Hall for the Palace, and a new refectory was built to the east for the community . In 1507 and 1508 the dances, masques, and banquets concluding the tournaments of the Wild Knight and the Black Lady were held in the converted refectory.

A corps of guards were instituted at the end of the 15th century to guard the monarch and enforce law and order within the precincts of the palace and Abbey Sanctuary called the High Constables and Guard of Honour of the Palace of Holyroodhouse.

=== 16th century onwards ===
Royal influence over the abbey further increased when in 1538 Robert Stewart, the infant, illegitimate son of James V, was appointed as commendator of Holyrood.

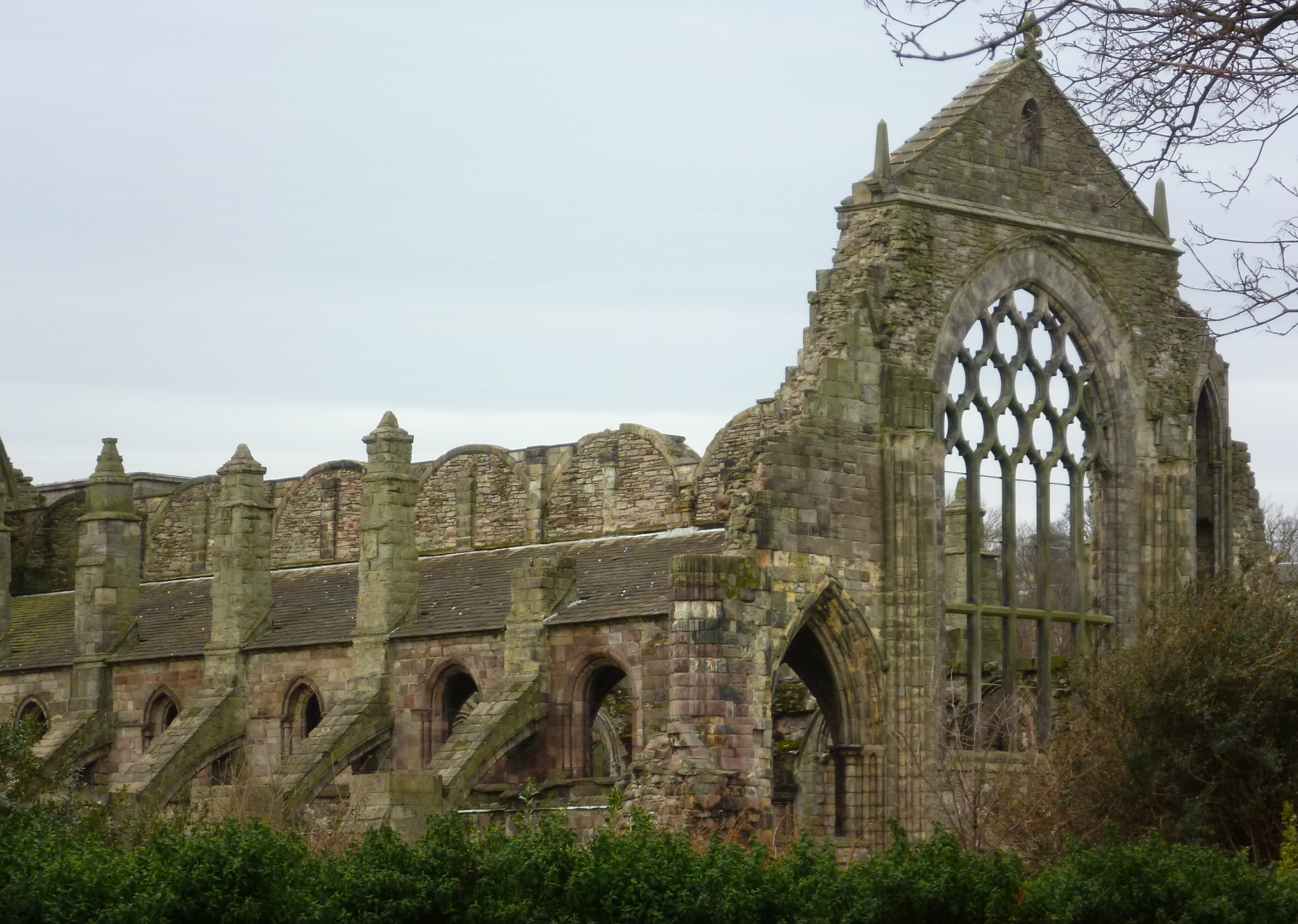
The ruins of the abbey church

During the War of the Rough Wooing, the invading English armies of the Earl of Hertford inflicted structural damage on Holyrood Abbey in 1544 and 1547. Lead was stripped from the roof, the bells were removed, and the contents of the abbey were plundered. In 1559, during the Scottish Reformation, the abbey suffered further damage when a mob destroyed the altars and looted the rest of the church. With the Reformation and the end of monastic services, the east end of the abbey church became redundant. In 1569, Adam Bothwell, the commendator of Holyrood, informed the General Assembly of the Church of Scotland that the east end was in such a state of disrepair that the choir and transept should be demolished. This was done the following year, retaining only the nave, which by then was serving as the parish church of the burgh of Canongate. Between 1570 and 1573 an east gable was erected, closing the east end of the former nave, all but two of the windows in the nave were blocked up, the royal tombs were removed to a new royal burial vault in the south aisle and the old east end was demolished.

The abbey was extensively remodelled in 1633 for the coronation of Charles I which was undertaken with full Anglican rites.

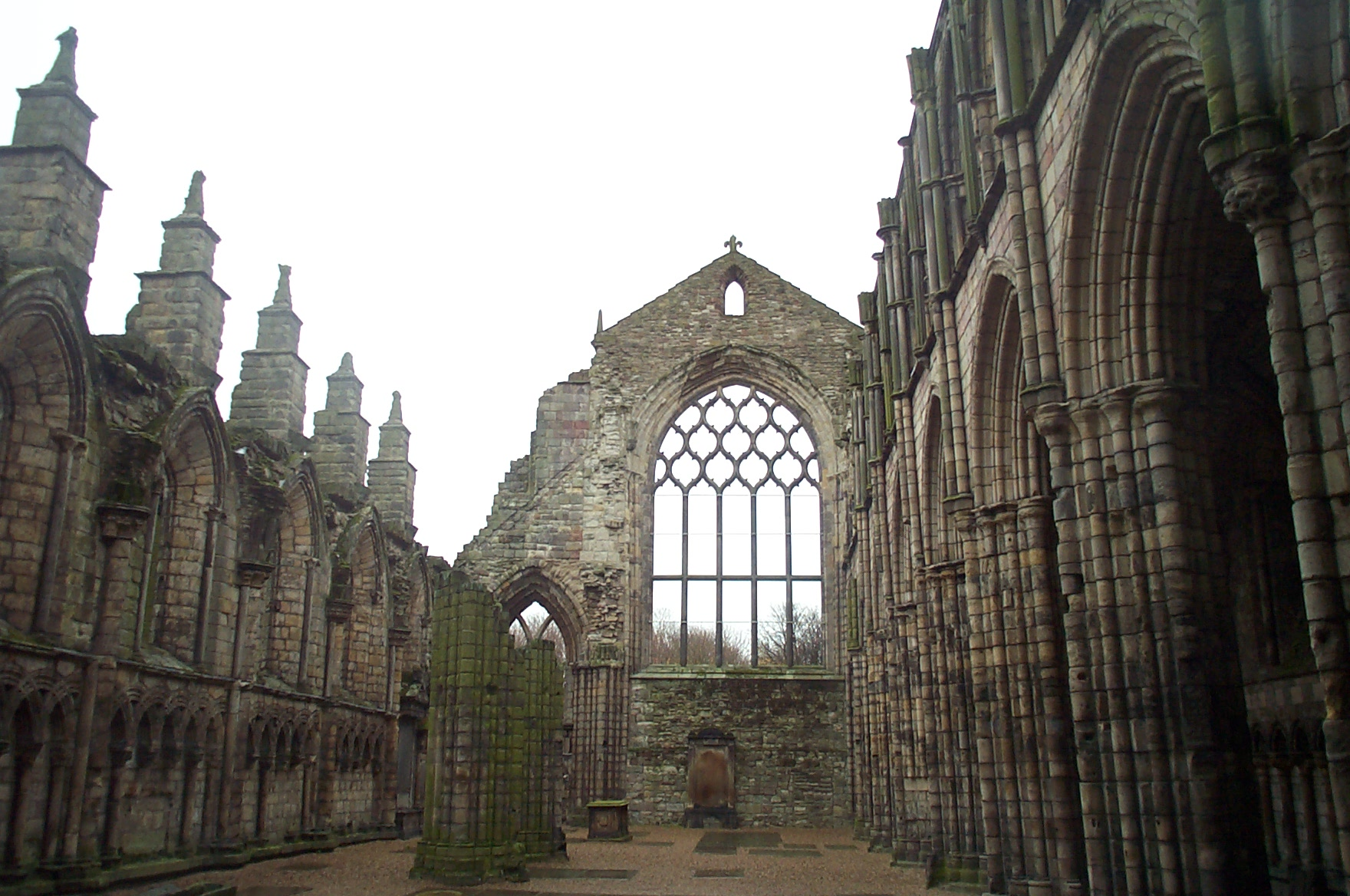
The ruined nave

In 1686, James VII established a Jesuit college within Holyrood Palace. The following year, the Protestant congregation was moved to the new Kirk of the Canongate, and the abbey was converted into a Roman Catholic Chapel Royal and the chapel of the Order of the Thistle. Alexander Dunbar Winchester (Prefect Apostolic of Scotland) became the Dean of the Royal Chapel. The abbey church was remodelled according to the plans of James Smith, and was fitted with elaborate thrones and stalls for the individual Knights of the Thistle, carved by Grinling Gibbons. However, in 1688, following the Glorious Revolution, the Edinburgh mob broke into the abbey, entered the Chapel Royal and desecrated the royal tombs.

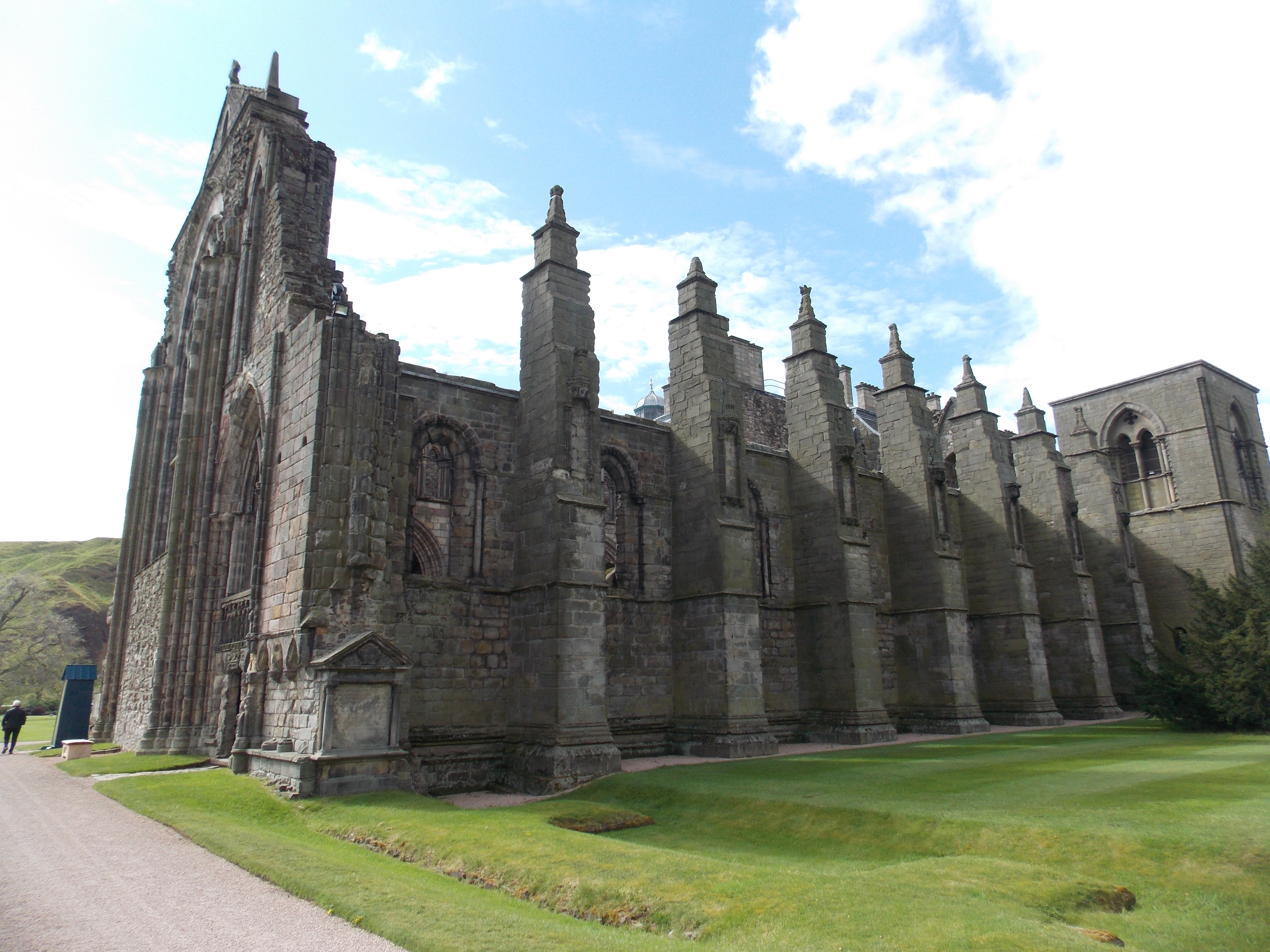
The ruins of the abbey, seen from the north side

The association of the church with these events and the absence of a royal court left the building out of public interest. James Hamilton, 6th Duke of Hamilton commissioned the architect John Douglas and the stonemason James McPherson to replace the ageing timber roof trusses by stone vaults and outer stone slabs, the work being carried out between 1758 and 1760. However, this proved to be a disastrous change. The excessive weight of the stone could not be supported by the walls. The strength of stone vaults depends on the containment of their thrusts, which the decayed flying buttresses could not contain any more, and a small movement (less than 1/30 of the span) can cause severe deformation and collapse. It took six years for the deformation to become alarming. This forced the Barons of the Exchequer (the administrators of the Palace) to close the church on safety grounds in 1766, following inspection by William Mylne.

On 2 December 1768 the roof collapsed in two stages, leaving the abbey as it currently stands, a roofless ruin.

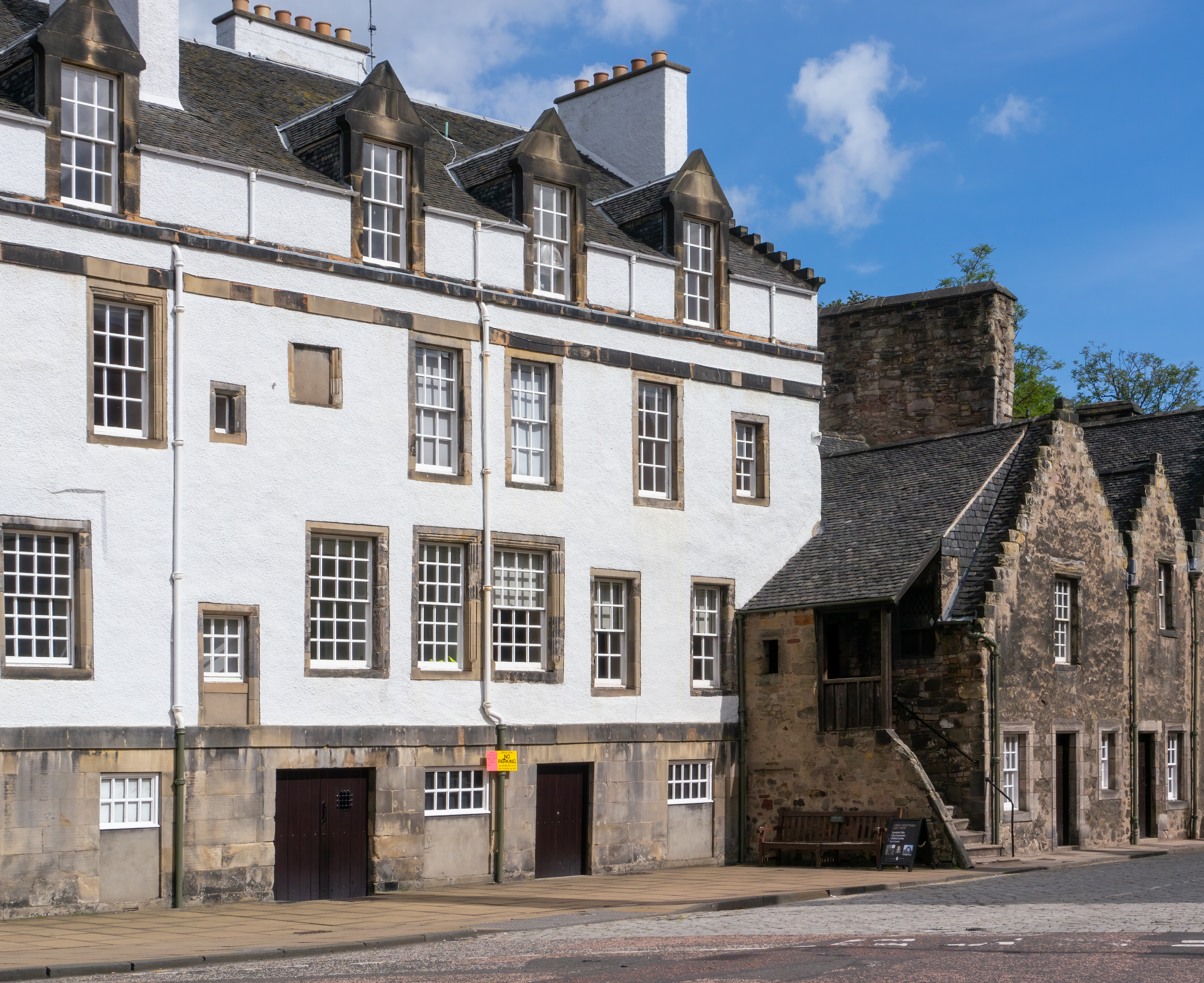
The Abbey Strand, originally served as apartments for those seeking refuge within the Abbey sanctuary

The restoration of the abbey has been proposed several times since the 18th century – in 1835 by the architect James Gillespie Graham as a meeting place for the General Assembly of the Church of Scotland, and in 1906, as a chapel for the Knights of the Thistle – but both proposals were rejected.

In July 1829, the ruins of the Holyrood Chapel were visited by Felix Mendelssohn. Holyrood, as Mendelssohn related to his family in a letter, served as inspiration for his Scottish Symphony.

== List of abbots ==
(derived from Grant's "Old and New Edinburgh")

- Alwyn (d. 1155) author of "Book of Homilies and Epistles"
- Osbert (d. 1150)
- William I, built a wall around the abbey
- Robert, who helped to found the new burgh of Canongate
- John, who campaigned to move the monastery from Edinburgh Castle to the Abbey
- William II (1206)
- Walter (d. 1217), Prior of Inchcolm Abbey abbot from 1209
- William III
- William IV, son of Owen, resigned 1227 to become a hermit on Inchkeith but returned later as a monk
- Elias I, son of Nicholas, drained the marsh behind the abbey
- Henry of Holyrood, left in 1253 to become Bishop of Galloway
- Radulph
- Adam (or Alexander) a "traitor" who paid homage to Edward I of England
- Elias II, involved in the Templar Trials of 1309, present in 1322 at the attack of the English army under Edward II
- Symon of Wedale, present at the vigil of St Barnabas in 1326
- John II, appears in charters of 1338
- Bartholomew, abbot in 1342
- Thomas, abbot at the ransom of King David II in 1346 and oversaw his funeral in 1371
- John III, abbot in 1372, cared for John of Gaunt at the abbey
- David, abbot from 1384 in the reign of Robert II. During his tenure the abbey was burnt by the army of Richard II
- John of Leith, abbot in 1386, granted the lands of Canonmills to Edinburgh in 1423
- Patrick, abbot in 1435, crowned James II of Scotland on 23 March 1437 and on 3 July 1449 crowned Mary of Gueldres as Queen Consort, and wed her to James II
- James, abbot in 1450
- Archibald Crawford (d. 1483), son of Sir William Crawford of Haining, who was a commissioner at the truce with the English organised at Coventry in 1450 and abbot of Holyrood in 1457. In 1469 he married James III of Scotland to Margaret of Norway. In 1480 he was Lord High Treasurer of Scotland. He added the buttresses to the abbey and the ornate doorway to the north aisle.
- Robert Bellenden, abbot in 1486. In 1493 he organised the building of a chapel to St Ninian (later known as North Leith Parish Church) and adjacent toll bridge (known as Bellenden's Bridge). In 1507 he bestowed the title of Defender of the Faith on King James IV of Scotland
- George Crichton, abbot in 1515, also served as Lord Privy Seal from 1519. Became Bishop of Dunkeld in 1528. Originator of the Dunkeld Lectern.
- William Douglas of Coldingham (d. 1528)
- Robert Cairncross of Corstorphine (d. 1545), High Treasurer of Scotland in 1529 and 1537. Left in 1538 when appointed Bishop of Ross
- Robert Stewart of Strathdon, illegitimate son of James V by Eupheme Elphinstone. In 1559 he joined the Reformation party and relinquished his position as Abbot. He married in 1561 and Mary Queen of Scots (his half-sister) granted him a wedding present of lands in Orkney and Shetland. He was created an earl in 1581.
- Adam Bothwell (d. 1593), acquired the abbacy in 1559. Buried in the abbey.
- John Bothwell, eldest son of the above, acquired the abbacy in 1581. Was Lord of Session in 1593.

== Coronations ==
Holyrood Abbey was the site of the coronations of James II in 1437, Margaret Tudor in 1503, Mary of Guise in 1540, Anne of Denmark in 1590, and Charles I in 1633.

== Weddings ==
The abbey was the site of numerous royal weddings. These include:

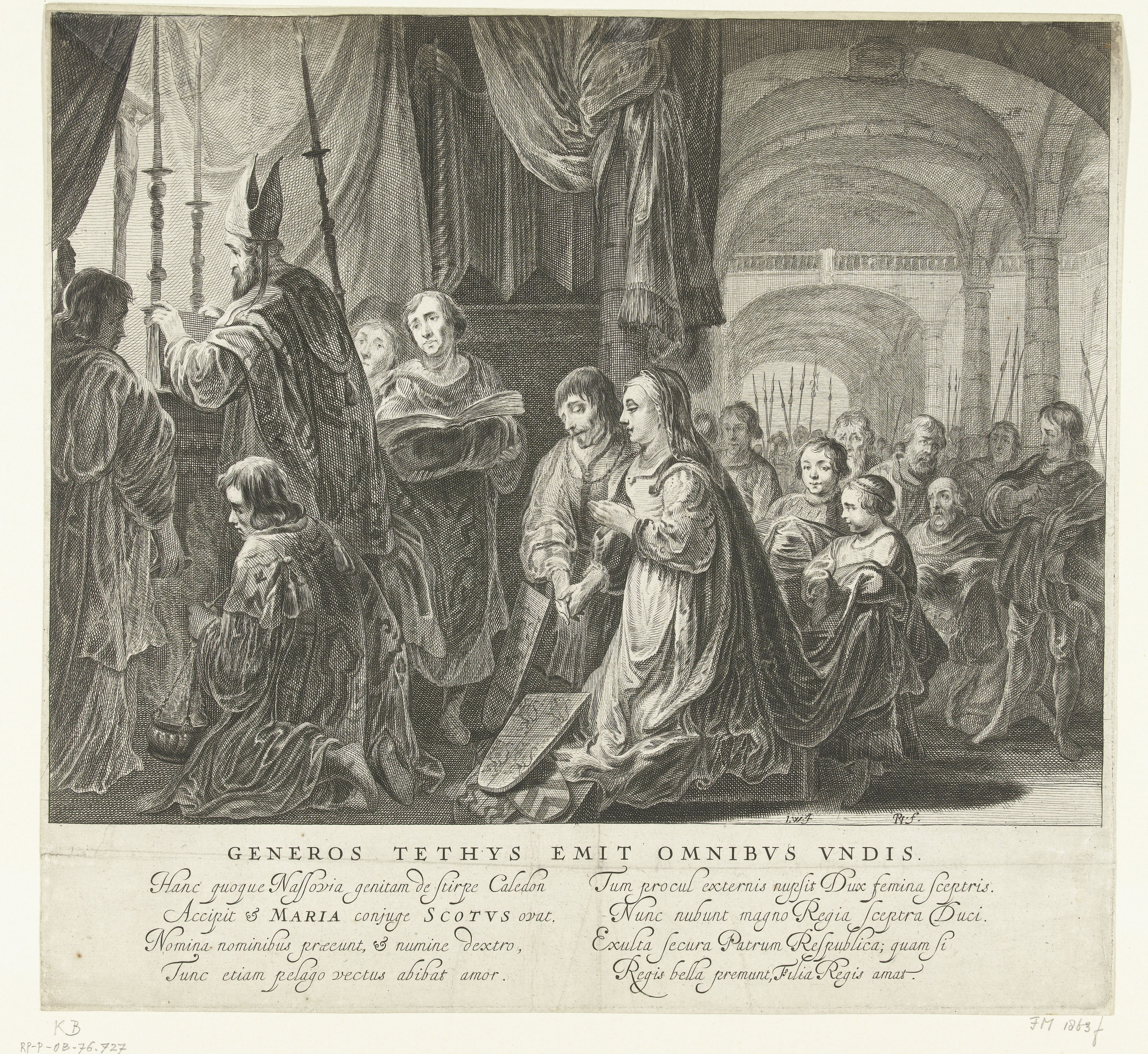
17th-century engraving of the wedding of James II and Mary of Guelders, performed by abbot Patrick

- James II and Mary of Guelders in 1449
- James III and Margaret of Denmark in 1469
- James IV and Margaret Tudor in 1503

== Births ==
- James II in 1430

== Burials ==
The abbey was the site of many royal funerals and interments, mostly in the east bay of the south aisle, known as the "Royal Vault". Royals originally interred here include:

- King David II in 1371
- King James II in 1460
- Arthur, Duke of Rothesay (second son of James IV) in 1510
- Madeleine of Valois in 1537, teenage bride of James V
- James, Duke of Rothesay (eldest son of James V) in 1541
- Arthur, Duke of Albany (second son of James V) in 1541
- King James V in 1542
- Henry Stuart, Lord Darnley in 1567
- Margaret (second daughter of James VI) in 1600
- Mary of Guelders in 1463 (Mary was originally buried in Trinity College Kirk)
- Stillborn or short-lived child (1681) of James II of England and Mary of Modena around February or March 1681

Non-royal interments/monuments of note include:

- Fergus of Galloway
- Alexander Mylne d. 1643, master mason. Monument restored by his descendant Robert Mylne in 1776.
- Robert Douglas, Viscount Belhaven d. 1639. Recumbent marble statue by John Schoerman very similar to another work by Schoerman in Westminster Abbey.
- Medieval slab c. 1300 to Sibilla de Stratun (presumably what is now Straiton).
- Medieval coffin to Robert Ross d. 1409, incised with a chalice.
- Bishop George Wishart d. 1671. Vandalised cherubs survive on the pediment, seemingly by Robert Mylne.
- George, Earl of Sutherland, d. 1703, and his grandson, William – Monument by James Smith, including coroneted family names on the columns
- Jane, Countess of Eglinton, d. 1596. A tomb-chest form similar to others in Greyfriars Kirkyard.
- John Hamilton, Lord Magdalens (d. 1632)
- Thomas Lowes of Ridley Hall d.1812
- James Meldrum, Lord Segie (d.1588)
- Adam Bothwell d. 1593, Bishop of Orkney, and his son John Bothwell, Lord Holyroodhouse
- Margaret Bakster (the old spelling of Baxter) d. 1592
- Adjacent to the above an illegible monument to John (?) d. 1543 with cross, compasses and tools.
- Euphemia Stewart d. 1817, an obelisk bracketed out of the wall.
- George Douglas, Bishop of Moray d. 1589
- David Stuart Moncreiff of Moredun (1710–1790)
- Dunbar Douglas, 4th Earl of Selkirk d. 1799
- The Hon John Webb Seymour (1777–1819)
- Sir John Sinclair, 1st Baronet (1754–1835)
- Mary Proby, Lady Seaforth (1754–1829)
- Anne, Lady Alvanley (1757–1825)
- Sir John Sinclair 7th baronet of Dunbeath (1794–1873)

== In art ==
The abbey ruins are depicted in the 19th-century painting The Ruins of Holyrood Chapel by the French artist Louis Daguerre.

== In literature ==
In March 1825, a moonlit scene entitled 'Ruins of Holyrood Chapel' was put into the Diorama, Regent's Park, London, inspiring the poem 'Holyrood' by Letitia Elizabeth Landon, printed in The London Literary Gazette. Although the article in the Gazette does not say so specifically, this is presumably the display mentioned in the article on the work by Louis Daguerre above.

== See also ==
- Abbeys and priories in Scotland
- Abbot of Holyrood, for a list of abbots and commendators
- Kirk of the Canongate
- Oldest buildings in the United Kingdom
- Dalgarnock Village, Church and Parish
