= Whithorn =

Coordinates: 54°44′06″N 4°24′58″W

Whithorn: Scottish Gaelic: Taigh Mhartainn
- Town
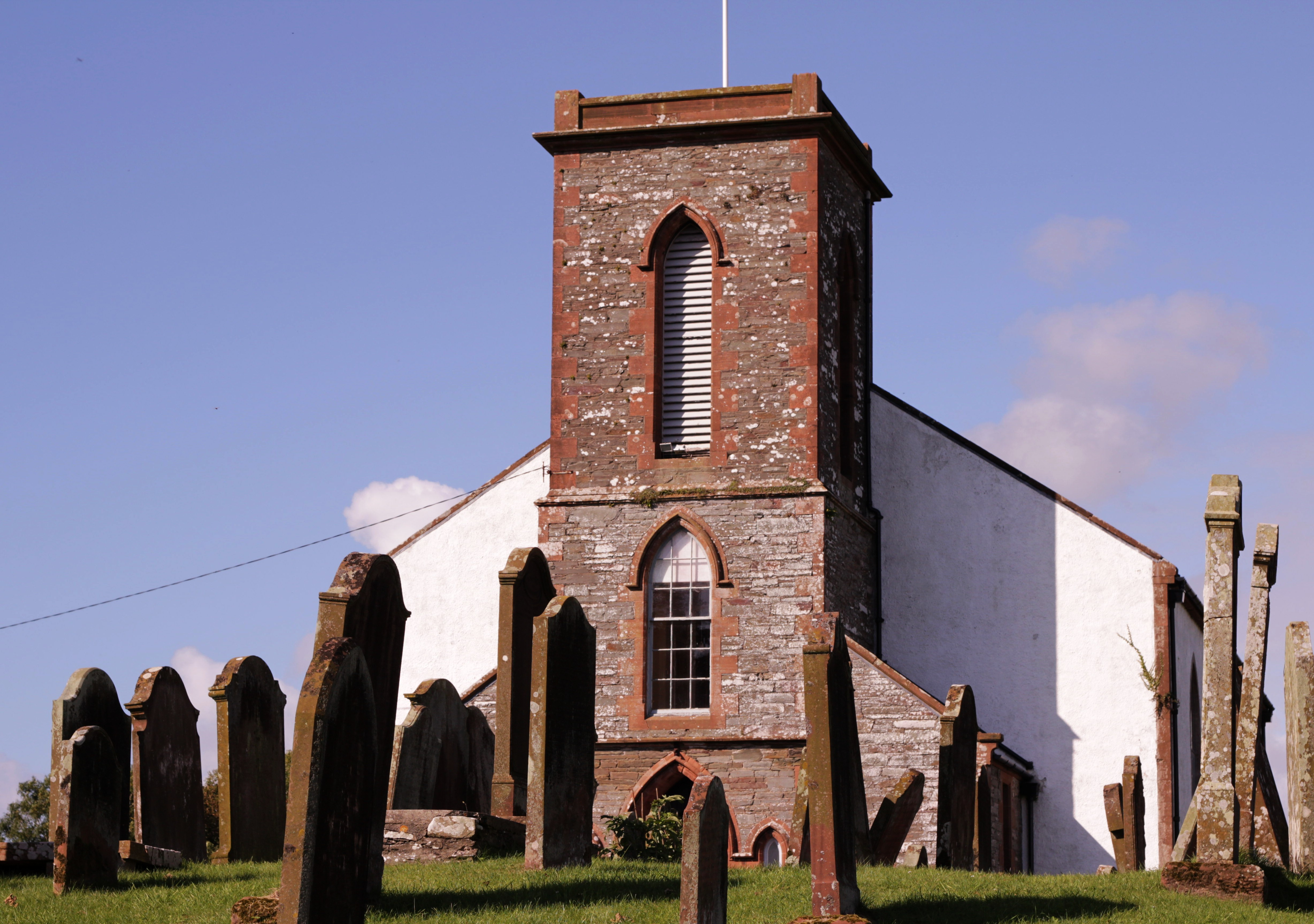
- St Ninians's Priory Church

- Location within Dumfries and Galloway
- Population: 723 (2022)
- OS grid reference: NX445405
  - Edinburgh: 97 mi (156 km)
  - London: 285 mi (459 km)
- Council area: Dumfries and Galloway
- Lieutenancy area: Wigtownshire
- Country: Scotland
- Sovereign state: United Kingdom
- Post town: NEWTON STEWART
- Postcode district: DG8
- Dialling code: 01988
- Police: Scotland
- Fire: Scottish
- Ambulance: Scottish
- UK Parliament: Dumfries and Galloway
- Scottish Parliament: Galloway and West Dumfries

Whithorn (Scots pronunciation: [ˈʍɪthorn]; Scottish Gaelic: Taigh Mhàrtainn), is a small town and historic royal burgh in Dumfries and Galloway, Scotland. Historically part of Wigtownshire, it is about 97 miles (156 km) southwest of Edinburgh, 78 miles (126 km) south-southwest of Glasgow, and 10 miles (16 kilometres) south of Wigtown. It had a population of 723 in 2022, making it the fourth-smallest town in all of Scotland.

The town was the location of the first recorded Christian church in Scotland, Candida Casa "White/Shining House", built by Saint Ninian around 397 CE.

== Toponymy ==
Mention of Whithorn (as Hwiterne) in the Anglo-Saxon Chronicle

There is a tradition that Ninian built a church of stone and lime nearby in the late 4th century; it was called Candida Casa, 'White/Shining House'. "Whithorn" is a modern form of the Anglo-Saxon version of this name, Hwit Ærn or Hwiterne, 'White House'. In Gallovidian Gaelic, it was called Rosnat, or Futarna, the latter a version of the Anglo-Saxon name (Gaelic has no sound corresponding to English wh). Ninian dedicated the church to his master Martin of Tours, and when he died (probably in 432) Ninian was buried in the church.

== Early history ==
A monastery and diocese of the Anglo-Saxon kingdom of Northumbria was founded on the site in the 8th century, possibly originating with a 6th-century Magnum Monasterium, or monastery of Rosnat. It was the centre of the revived See of Galloway (or Candida Casa) under the patronage of Fergus, Lord of Galloway and Bishop Gille Aldan from the 12th century. The late-medieval cathedral Whithorn Priory is ruinous, much of it having disappeared completely apart from the much-altered aisleless nave and vaults at the former eastern end which once held the shrine of St Ninian, one of medieval Scotland's major pilgrimage destinations. A museum in the town contains finds from the site, which has been extensively excavated in recent years. A late-medieval gateway with the arms of the King of Scots leads into the site of the priory, which contains the 19th-century parish church and a museum of carved stones (Historic Environment Scotland). The collection of early medieval stones is one of the largest in Scotland, and includes the country's earliest surviving Christian memorial, the 5th-century inscribed Latinus Stone. The museum layout and display was revised and greatly improved in 2005.

=== The crozier ===
One of the finest artefacts found at the site is the Whithorn Crozier. The gilded and enamelled crozier is an outstanding example of champlevé enamels which were being made in England in the second half of the 12th century, and this one dates to around 1175. It is now housed in the National Museums of Scotland, although it is loaned to the Whithorn Trust Visitor Centre every summer. It is thought that the crozier was buried with the body of Simon de Wedale, who was one of the Bishops of Whithorn.

== Churches ==
- St Martin and St Ninian Catholic Church, George St, 1959–60. Designed by Harry Stuart Goodhart Rendel and is his only known building in Scotland. The interior was reordered with the altar brought forward from the east wall following the reforms of the Second Vatican Council. At that time the baldacchino was also demolished, and the decorative ironwork at the baptistry and communion rail scrapped. The original Creetown granite altar was placed outside against the east elevation. A possible source of inspiration is the church of San Julián de los Prados Ovieda, Asturias in Spain. The East elevation has a carved Hew Lorimer crucifix mounted to the wall. The crucifix has not fared well after poor cleaning in 1997 led to significant loss of detail. The church including the quadrant walls is listed Category C(S).
- St Ninian's Priory Church, Church of Scotland. Built 1822 using stones from the medieval Whithorn Priory. The tower was added in the mid-19th century. Porch added by Peter MacGregor Chalmers in 1914.

== Geography ==
Whithorn's link to the sea was the port known as the Isle of Whithorn (a separate community from Whithorn itself and actually a peninsula). It was much used in the Middle Ages by pilgrims arriving by boat. The 13th-century Saint Ninian's Chapel marked the point where pilgrims came ashore (the roofless remains are looked after by Historic Environment Scotland).

The 1st-century settlement of Rispain Camp, about 1 mile (1.6 km) west of Whithorn, is also in the care of Historic Scotland.

== Railway ==
Whithorn was once served by a railway station until 1950 when the passenger service was withdrawn and the freight services falling victim to the Beeching axe in 1964. The track was lifted in April 1965.

== Listed buildings ==
List of listed buildings in Whithorn, Dumfries and Galloway

== Gallery ==
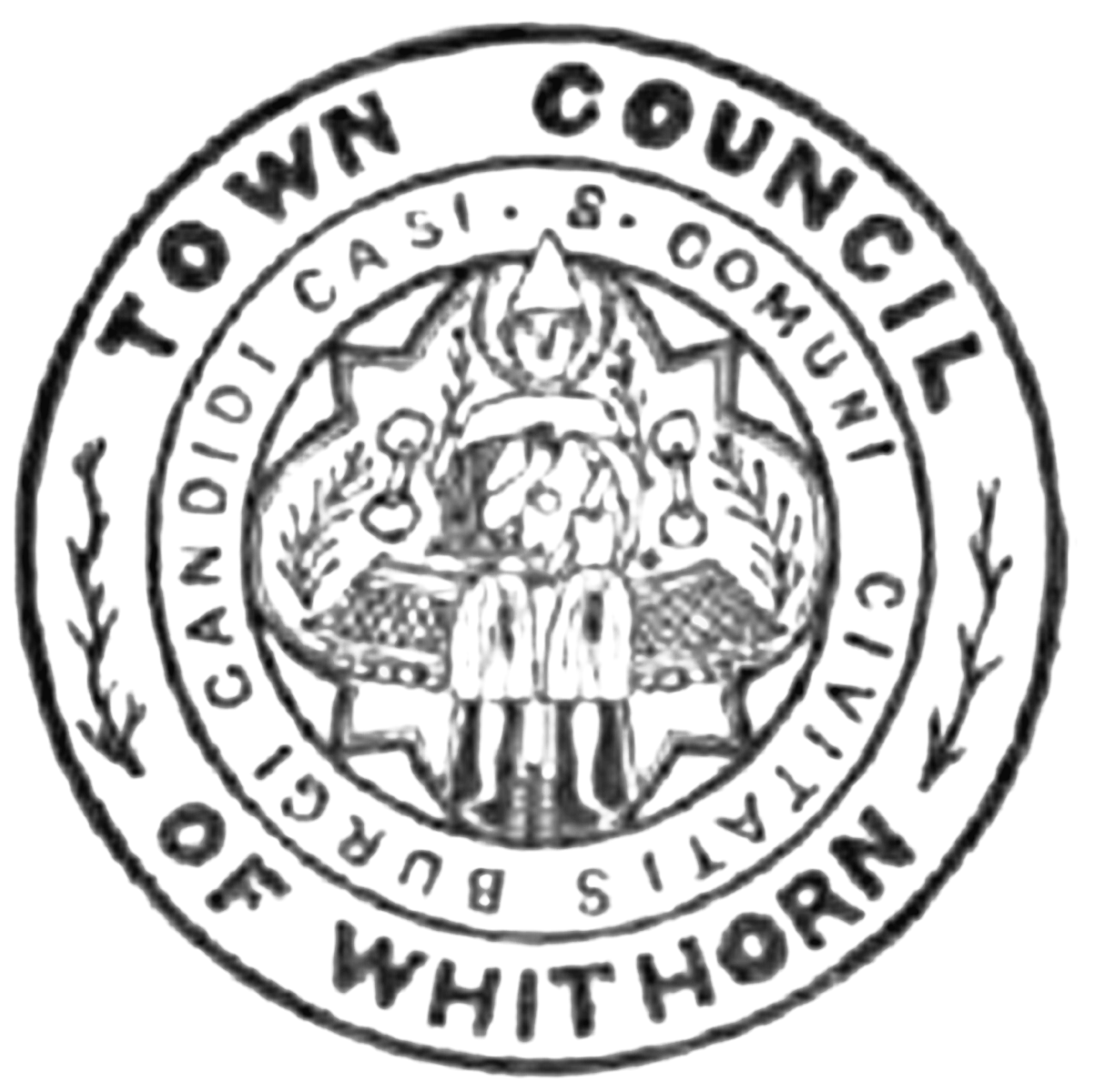
Seal of the Burgh of Whithorn

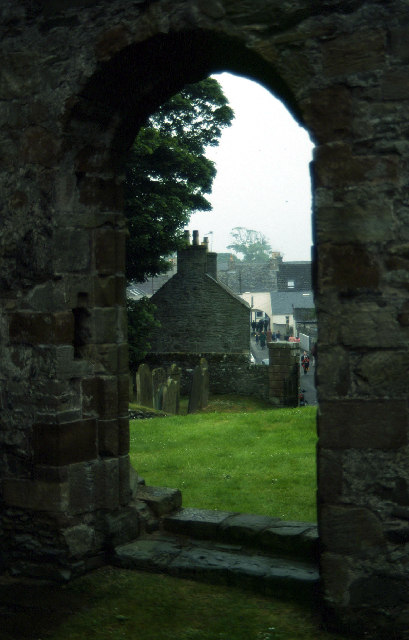
Whithorn Priory

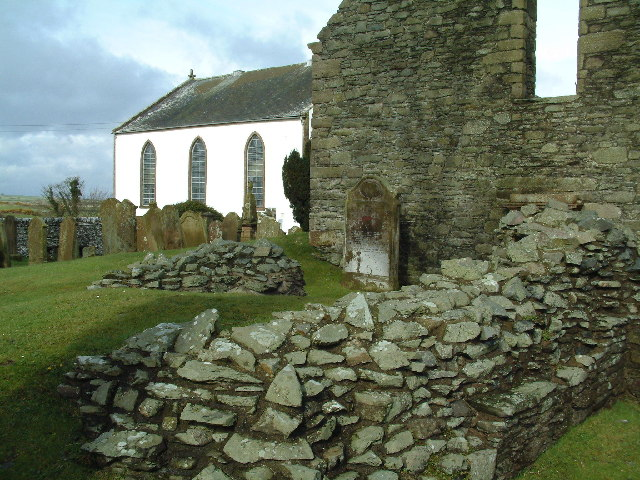
Remains of the Priory Nave at Whithorn

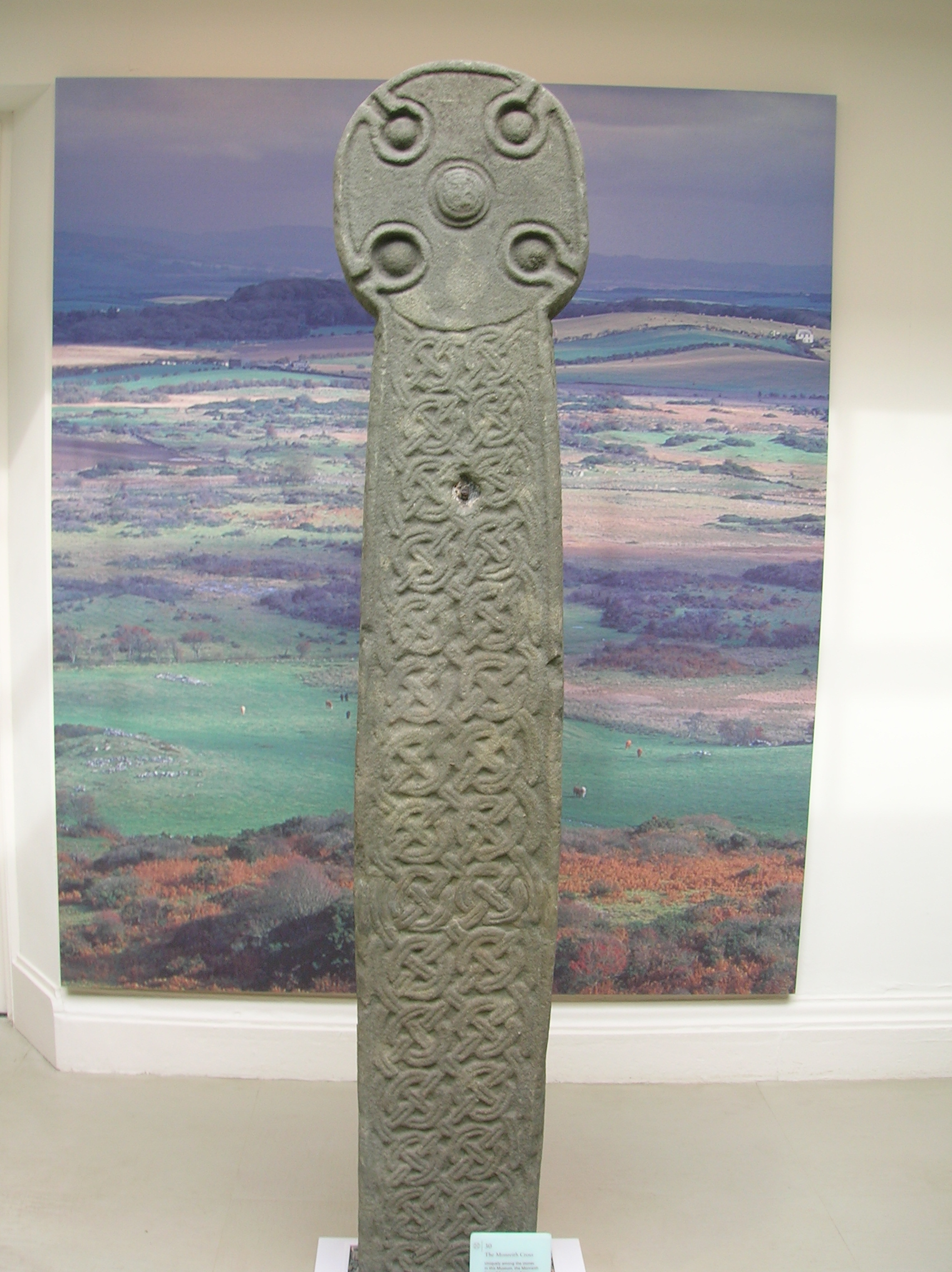
The Monreith Cross in the Whithorn Museum

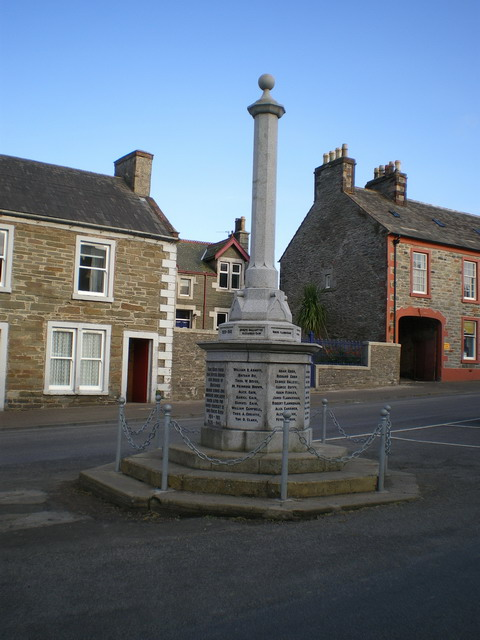
Whithorn War Memorial

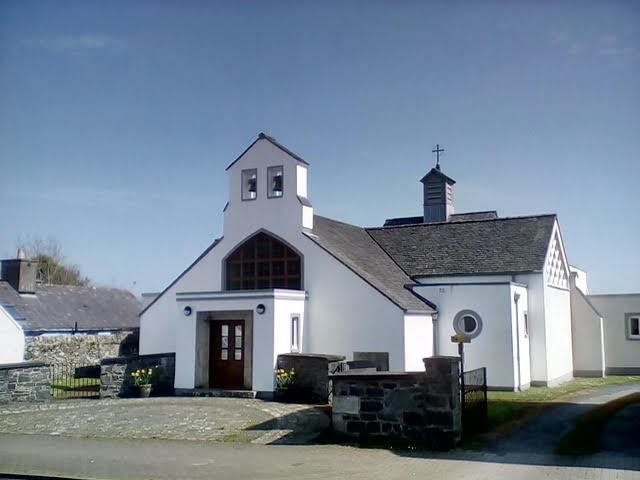
St Martin and St Ninian Church, George Street

== Residents ==
- Charles Lockhart (1818–1905), petroleum producer and refiner, was born in Cairnhead, Isle of Whithorn. Co-founder in 1874 with John D Rockefeller of the Standard Oil Company (Esso).
- The poet and scholar of South American literature Alastair Reid was born in Whithorn on 22 March 1926. He was known for his lighthearted style of poems and for his translations of South American poets Jorge Luis Borges and Pablo Neruda. Although he was known for translations, his own poems had gained notice during his lifetime. In his later years he was a frequent summer visitor, with his wife Leslie staying in a cottage on the Galloway House estate.
- George Dickie (1912–1951) was born and grew up in Whithorn. Using the nom de guerre of Jack Brent, he fought in the Spanish Civil War of 1936–38, against the fascist forces of General Franco. A memorial plaque was unveiled to him in 2006 on the former butcher's shop next to The Pend where he once worked as an assistant. His story is told by his nephew, John Dickie, in the 2012 biography Geordie's Story: A Life of Jack Brent.
- Jeannie Donnan (1864–1942), "The Galloway Poetess", was born in Gatehouse of Fleet in Kirkcudbrightshire and later moved to Whithorn on George Street commemorated by a plaque. She wrote local poetry published as Hameland: The Poems of Jeannie Donnan, 1907; War Poems, 1915; The Hills of Hame, 1930, as well as in the Galloway Gazette.

== Notes and references ==
- Glenn, V. (2003). Romanesque and Gothic: decorative metalwork and ivory carvings in the Museum of Scotland. Edinburgh: Museum of Scotland.
