= Thomas de Kirkcudbright =

- Bishop of Galloway
- Church: Roman Catholic Church
- See: Diocese of Galloway
- In office: 1294–1324×1326
- Predecessor: Henry of Holyrood
- Successor: Simon de Wedale

Orders
- Consecration: 10 October 1294

Personal details
- Born: unknown Probably Galloway or Dumfriesshire
- Died: 4 April 1324 × 23 September 1326

Thomas de Kirkcudbright, also known as Thomas de Dalton [de Daltoun], was a medieval prelate from the Kingdom of Scotland. He was apparently a nutritus, or foster son, of Robert V de Brus, Lord of Annandale, and seems to have been closely linked in some way to Adam de Kirkcudbright, the man who held the church of Dalton in Annandale. He was likely a native Galwegian or perhaps a native of Annandale.

As the chaplain of Robert de Brus, he was elected by the chapter of Whithorn Cathedral to replace the recently deceased Henry of Holyrood as Bishop of Galloway, sometime before 13 January 1294. He offered obedience to the Archbishop of York on 30 May and was consecrated on 10 October. His election was initially opposed by John Balliol, King of the Scots, though John was eventually reconciled to the election. By the time of his election to the bishopric, he was already a priest and was styled magister, indicating the completion of a university education - though not details of his university education are not known.

Although naturally better disposed to the Bruces than Balliols, his exact role during the turbulence of the First War of Scottish Independence is not clear; after the deposition of Balliol by King Edward I of England, he was co-operative with the English crown, both in his role as a senior inhabitant of the Kingdom of Scotland and as a suffragan of the Archbishop of York. He spent a great deal of time in this period both in Galloway, and in England, and was a close associate of John de Halton, Bishop of Carlisle. The latter, a papal tax collector, granted Thomas a £40 loan from the papal funds stored at Tongland Abbey, in August 1294, undoubtedly related to his accession as Bishop of Galloway.

It came to be thought by some York authorities that he had never adhered to the cause of King Robert I of Scotland, when they called him to a council on this basis on 5 March 1323. Bishop Thomas however had spent a lot of time in the post-Bannockburn kingdom, attending the Ayr assembly of 27 April 1315, where he added his seal to a declaration about the Bruce succession; he added his seal to another pro-Bruce document at some point between October 1314 and November 1316, and attended the Scone parliament of 3 December 1318. His date of death is unknown exactly, but it was after 4 April 1324, and had occurred by 23 September 1326, when his successor Simon de Wedale was elected to succeed him.

== Notes ==
Religious titles
| Preceded by Henry of Holyrood | Bishop of Galloway; 1294–1324×1326 | Succeeded by Simon de Wedale |
