= List of listed buildings in Whithorn, Dumfries and Galloway =

This is a list of listed buildings in the civil parish of Whithorn, in Dumfries and Galloway, Scotland.

== List ==
Name	Location	Date Listed	Grid Ref. (Note: Sometimes known as OSGB36, the grid reference (where provided) is based on the British national grid reference system used by the Ordnance Survey. • "Guide to National Grid". Ordnance Survey. • "Get-a-map". Ordnance Survey.)	Geo-coordinates	Notes	LB Number (Note: Historic Environment Scotland assign a unique alphanumeric identifier to each designated site in Scotland, for listed buildings this always begins with "LB", for example "LB12345".)	Image
107 George Street				54°43′54″N 4°25′01″W	Category B	43766	Upload Photo
51 George Street				54°43′59″N 4°24′57″W	Category C(S)	42194	Upload Photo
53 George Street And Entrance To Priory				54°43′59″N 4°24′57″W	Category A	42195	Upload another image
55-57 (Odd Nos) George Street				54°43′59″N 4°24′57″W	Category A	42196	Upload Photo
65, 67 And 69 George Street, Including Old Town Hall And Bell Tower				54°43′58″N 4°24′59″W	Category B	42197	Upload another image
77 George Street, The Clydesdale Bank, Walls And Railings				54°43′56″N 4°24′59″W	Category C(S)	42200	Upload Photo
79 George Street				54°43′56″N 4°24′59″W	Category B	42201	Upload Photo
83 George Street				54°43′56″N 4°24′59″W	Category C(S)	42203	Upload Photo
101 George Street				54°43′54″N 4°25′01″W	Category C(S)	42210	Upload Photo
8 George Street				54°44′03″N 4°24′52″W	Category B	42220	Upload Photo
58 George Street				54°43′58″N 4°24′56″W	Category C(S)	42234	Upload Photo
118 George Street				54°43′52″N 4°25′01″W	Category C(S)	42251	Upload Photo
122 George Street				54°43′51″N 4°25′02″W	Category C(S)	42253	Upload Photo
25 St John Street				54°44′09″N 4°24′53″W	Category B	42259	Upload Photo
70 St John Street				54°44′04″N 4°24′52″W	Category C(S)	42263	Upload Photo
Isle Of Whithorn, 66-70 (Even Nos) Main Street				54°41′59″N 4°21′45″W	Category C(S)	19238	Upload Photo
Isle Of Whithorn, 76-78 (Even Nos) Main Street				54°41′58″N 4°21′44″W	Category C(S)	19240	Upload Photo
Reiffer Park With Retaining Walls				54°46′42″N 4°25′09″W	Category B	19247	Upload Photo
Isle Of Whithorn, 38 Main Street, Low Isle House				54°42′03″N 4°21′55″W	Category B	17070	Upload Photo
Isle Of Whithorn, Isle Parish Church (Church Of Scotland)				54°41′58″N 4°21′46″W	Category B	16722	Upload Photo
71 And 73 George Street				54°43′57″N 4°24′58″W	Category B	42198	Upload Photo
81 George Street				54°43′56″N 4°24′59″W	Category C(S)	42202	Upload Photo
85 George Street				54°43′55″N 4°24′59″W	Category C(S)	42204	Upload Photo
91-93 (Odd Nos) George Street				54°43′55″N 4°25′01″W	Category C(S)	42207	Upload Photo
109 George Street				54°43′53″N 4°25′02″W	Category B	42212	Upload Photo
2 George Street (Corner With St John Street) The Cross House				54°44′04″N 4°24′52″W	Category C(S)	42217	Upload Photo
12-14 (Even Nos) George Street And Rubble Wall To Rear				54°44′02″N 4°24′53″W	Category B	42222	Upload Photo
26 George Street				54°44′01″N 4°24′54″W	Category B	42226	Upload Photo
30-32 (Even Nos) George Street				54°44′00″N 4°24′54″W	Category B	42228	Upload Photo
60 George Street				54°43′58″N 4°24′56″W	Category B	42235	Upload Photo
96 And 98 George Street				54°43′54″N 4°24′58″W	Category C(S)	42241	Upload Photo
102 George Street				54°43′53″N 4°24′59″W	Category B	42243	Upload Photo
112 George Street				54°43′52″N 4°25′01″W	Category B	42248	Upload Photo
114 George Street				54°43′52″N 4°25′01″W	Category C(S)	42249	Upload Photo
126 George Street				54°43′51″N 4°25′02″W	Category B	42255	Upload Photo
33 High Street				54°43′46″N 4°25′08″W	Category C(S)	42258	Upload Photo
53 St John Street, Whithorn Town Hall With Gate, Railings And Quadrant Wall				54°44′06″N 4°24′54″W	Category C(S)	42261	Upload Photo
Whithorn Priory				54°44′01″N 4°25′01″W	Category A	42266	Upload another image
Isle Of Whithorn, 24-30 (Even Nos) Main Street				54°42′03″N 4°21′59″W	Category C(S)	19233	Upload Photo
Isle Of Whithorn, 86 Main Street				54°41′57″N 4°21′42″W	Category C(S)	19243	Upload Photo
Isle Of Whithorn, 12 Main Street				54°42′04″N 4°22′03″W	Category C(S)	16724	Upload Photo
Isle Of Whithorn, 14 Main Street				54°42′04″N 4°22′03″W	Category C(S)	16725	Upload Photo
Castlewigg Steading, Principal Range				54°45′33″N 4°26′48″W	Category C(S)	16750	Upload Photo
Bruce Street, Museum And Custodian's House And Boundary Walls				54°44′00″N 4°25′00″W	Category B	42185	Upload Photo
17 George Street, The Central Cafe				54°44′02″N 4°24′55″W	Category C(S)	42191	Upload Photo
89 George Street				54°43′55″N 4°25′00″W	Category B	42206	Upload Photo
111-113 (Odd Nos) George Street				54°43′53″N 4°25′02″W	Category C(S)	42213	Upload Photo
137 George Street				54°43′51″N 4°25′04″W	Category B	42216	Upload Photo
56 George Street				54°43′58″N 4°24′56″W	Category C(S)	42233	Upload Photo
108 George Street				54°43′53″N 4°25′00″W	Category B	42246	Upload Photo
130 George Street				54°43′50″N 4°25′02″W	Category C(S)	42257	Upload Photo
Whithorn Manse				54°44′04″N 4°25′09″W	Category B	42264	Upload Photo
Isle Of Whithorn, 80 Main Street				54°41′58″N 4°21′43″W	Category C(S)	19241	Upload Photo
Isle Of Whithorn, Isle Castle				54°42′05″N 4°21′57″W	Category A	16751	Upload Photo
Isle Of Whithorn, Harbour Row, Warehouses Including Isle Smugglers				54°41′54″N 4°21′46″W	Category B	16755	Upload Photo
11 George Street				54°44′02″N 4°24′54″W	Category C(S)	42189	Upload Photo
28 George Street				54°44′01″N 4°24′54″W	Category B	42227	Upload Photo
52-54 (Even Nos) George Street				54°43′58″N 4°24′55″W	Category C(S)	42232	Upload Photo
94 George Street				54°43′54″N 4°24′58″W	Category B	42240	Upload Photo
120 George Street				54°43′52″N 4°25′01″W	Category C(S)	42252	Upload Photo
Whithorn Parish Church, (Church Of Scotland) And Graveyard				54°44′02″N 4°25′03″W	Category B	42265	Upload Photo
Isle Of Whithorn, 5 Tonderghie Road				54°42′02″N 4°22′02″W	Category C(S)	19246	Upload Photo
Tonderghie House				54°41′31″N 4°25′02″W	Category A	19248	Upload another image
Isle Of Whithorn, 16 Main Street				54°42′04″N 4°22′02″W	Category B	16726	Upload Photo
Broughton Mains Farmhouse				54°46′34″N 4°24′34″W	Category B	16740	Upload Photo
Isle Of Whithorn, Harbour				54°41′53″N 4°21′48″W	Category B	16753	Upload Photo
7-9 (Odd Nos) George Street				54°44′03″N 4°24′54″W	Category B	42188	Upload Photo
103-105 (Odd Nos) George Street				54°43′54″N 4°25′01″W	Category C(S)	42211	Upload Photo
6 George Street				54°44′03″N 4°24′52″W	Category B	42219	Upload Photo
16-18 (Even Nos) George Street				54°44′01″N 4°24′53″W	Category B	42223	Upload Photo
34 George Street				54°44′00″N 4°24′54″W	Category B	42229	Upload Photo
36 And 38 George Street				54°44′00″N 4°24′55″W	Category C(S)	42230	Upload Photo
Isle Of Whithorn, 20 Main Street				54°42′03″N 4°22′02″W	Category B	19231	Upload Photo
Isle Of Whithorn, 62 Main Street				54°41′59″N 4°21′45″W	Category C(S)	19236	Upload Photo
Isle Of Whithorn, 64 Main Street				54°41′59″N 4°21′45″W	Category C(S)	19237	Upload Photo
Isle Of Whithorn, 72-74 (Even Nos) Main Street				54°41′59″N 4°21′44″W	Category C(S)	19239	Upload Photo
Isle Of Whithorn, 82 Main Street				54°41′58″N 4°21′43″W	Category B	19242	Upload Photo
Isle Of Whithorn, 3 Tonderghie Road				54°42′02″N 4°22′02″W	Category B	19245	Upload Photo
Isle Of Whithorn, Harbour Row, Harbour House, The Wigtown Bay Sailing Club				54°41′57″N 4°21′44″W	Category C(S)	16754	Upload Photo
Castlewigg Castle				54°45′32″N 4°26′42″W	Category B	16741	Upload Photo
5 George Street				54°44′03″N 4°24′54″W	Category C(S)	42187	Upload Photo
19 George Street, The Royal Bank Of Scotland				54°44′02″N 4°24′55″W	Category C(S)	42192	Upload Photo
99 George Street				54°43′54″N 4°25′00″W	Category C(S)	42209	Upload Photo
125-127 (Odd Nos) George Street				54°43′52″N 4°25′03″W	Category B	42214	Upload Photo
129 George Street				54°43′51″N 4°25′04″W	Category B	42215	Upload Photo
70 And 72 George Street				54°43′56″N 4°24′56″W	Category B	42238	Upload Photo
124 George Street				54°43′51″N 4°25′02″W	Category C(S)	42254	Upload Photo
Isle Of Whithorn, 58 Main Street				54°42′00″N 4°21′46″W	Category C(S)	19234	Upload Photo
Tonderghie Steadings				54°41′22″N 4°25′07″W	Category A	19249	Upload Photo
Isle Of Whithorn, St Ninians Kirk				54°41′53″N 4°21′39″W	Category B	16723	Upload another image
Isle Of Whithorn, 13 Main Street, Captain's Garden, Formerly Sea View				54°42′01″N 4°21′48″W	Category B	43736	Upload Photo
29 George Street And Walled Garden				54°44′01″N 4°24′55″W	Category B	42193	Upload Photo
87 George Street				54°43′55″N 4°25′00″W	Category C(S)	42205	Upload Photo
4 George Street				54°44′03″N 4°24′52″W	Category B	42218	Upload Photo
George Street, The Grapes Hotel				54°44′02″N 4°24′53″W	Category C(S)	42221	Upload Photo
22 And 24 George Street				54°44′01″N 4°24′53″W	Category B	42225	Upload Photo
42-44 (Even Nos) George Street				54°43′59″N 4°24′55″W	Category C(S)	42231	Upload Photo
92 George Street				54°43′55″N 4°24′58″W	Category B	42239	Upload Photo
104 George Street				54°43′53″N 4°25′00″W	Category C(S)	42244	Upload Photo
106 George Street				54°43′53″N 4°25′00″W	Category C(S)	42245	Upload Photo
128 George Street				54°43′51″N 4°25′02″W	Category C(S)	42256	Upload Photo
27 St John Street, "The Neuk" And Boundary Walls				54°44′09″N 4°24′54″W	Category B	42260	Upload Photo
Isle Of Whithorn, 22 Main Street, The Queens Arms				54°42′03″N 4°22′01″W	Category C(S)	19232	Upload Photo
Castlewigg Hotel				54°45′22″N 4°26′11″W	Category B	16742	Upload Photo
Isle Of Whithorn, Isle Farm				54°42′35″N 4°21′41″W	Category B	16752	Upload Photo
Isle Of Whithorn, 5 Main Street				54°42′03″N 4°22′02″W	Category C(S)	44188	Upload Photo
Isle Of Whithorn, 88 Main Street				54°41′57″N 4°21′42″W	Category C(S)	43737	Upload Photo
13-15 (Odd Nos) George Street				54°44′02″N 4°24′55″W	Category B	42190	Upload Photo
75 George Street, Registrar's Office				54°43′57″N 4°24′58″W	Category B	42199	Upload Photo
97 George Street				54°43′55″N 4°25′00″W	Category B	42208	Upload Photo
20 George Street				54°44′01″N 4°24′53″W	Category B	42224	Upload Photo
62-64 (Even Nos) George Street				54°43′57″N 4°24′56″W	Category C(S)	42236	Upload Photo
Post Office, 68 George Street				54°43′57″N 4°24′56″W	Category B	42237	Upload Photo
100 George Street				54°43′54″N 4°24′59″W	Category B	42242	Upload Photo
110 George Street				54°43′52″N 4°25′01″W	Category B	42247	Upload Photo
116 George Street				54°43′52″N 4°25′01″W	Category C(S)	42250	Upload Photo
22 St John Street, St John's Garage (Former UP Church)				54°44′11″N 4°24′52″W	Category C(S)	42262	Upload another image
Isle Of Whithorn, 60 Main Street				54°42′00″N 4°21′45″W	Category C(S)	19235	Upload Photo
Isle Of Whithorn, Sea Breeze And Rosnay, With Sea Wall				54°42′01″N 4°21′49″W	Category C(S)	19244	Upload Photo
Isle Of Whithorn, 56 Main Street				54°42′00″N 4°21′46″W	Category B	17071	Upload Photo
Isle Of Whithorn, 18 Main Street				54°42′03″N 4°22′02″W	Category B	16727	Upload Photo
George Street, St Martin And St Ninian Roman Catholic Church, Including Quadrant Walls				54°43′55″N 4°24′57″W	Category C(S)	51291	Upload Photo

== Key ==
The scheme for classifying buildings in Scotland is:

- Category A: "buildings of national or international importance, either architectural or historic; or fine, little-altered examples of some particular period, style or building type."
- Category B: "buildings of regional or more than local importance; or major examples of some particular period, style or building type, which may have been altered."
- Category C: "buildings of local importance; lesser examples of any period, style, or building type, as originally constructed or moderately altered; and simple traditional buildings which group well with other listed buildings."

In March 2016 there were 47,288 listed buildings in Scotland. Of these, 8% were Category A, and 50% were Category B, with the remaining 42% being Category C.
