= High Constables and Guard of Honour of the Palace of Holyroodhouse =

- Active: 16th Century (see History) – present
- Country: United Kingdom
- Role: Palace Guard
- Garrison/HQ: Edinburgh

Commanders
- Ceremonial chief: Charles III

Insignia
- Identification symbol: Holyrood stag with cross between antlers, surmounted by a crown

The High Constables of Holyroodhouse are a small corps of ceremonial bodyguards at the Sovereign's official residence in the Scottish capital, Edinburgh. Created in the early sixteenth century to protect the Monarch in residence at Holyrood, as well as to guard the Palace and Abbey, and enforce law and order within the precincts of the Palace and the Holyrood Abbey Sanctuary.

== History ==
=== Law and Order in the Abbey ===
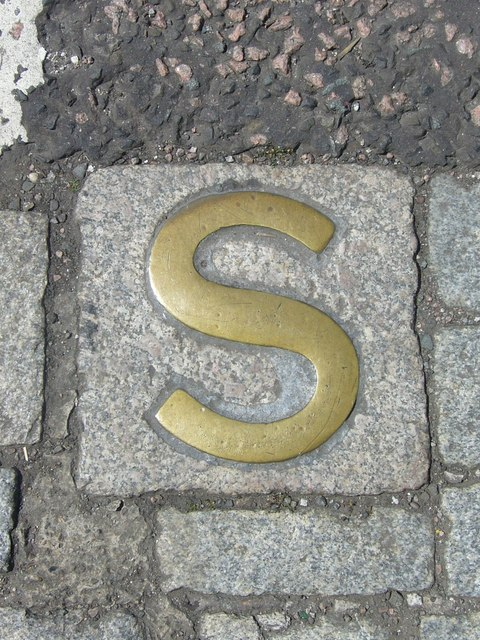
Sanctuary marker - denoting the parameters of the Holyrood Abbey Sanctuary

The Abbey at Holyrood dates from around 1130, with its charter granting it the right to hold a court. Like churches across the British isles the Abbey also offered sanctuary up to five miles in circumference around the Abbey, where people accused of crime and treason could flee to seek clemency and justice under the church court. Those seeking sanctuary at the Abbey would go before the Bailie of Holyroodhouse who would sit in judgement.

By the 1500s the Palace of Holyrood had begun to be established adjacent to the Abbey. As time went by the palace saw more use as a royal residence where members of the aristocracy and foreign dignitaries would be entertained, and where the Scottish Parliament and Privy Council would occasionally meet. Given how close the Abbey and sanctuary area was to this increasingly important location it became necessary for a guard to protect the monarch and their guests from the potentially dangerous individuals seeking sanctuary within the Abbey. The first constables to protect the monarch and palace were so appointed in the 1500s. An Act of 1617 instructed that the Constables were to be "chosen across the country by the magistrates of each burgh". Because of their age some have suggested the constables have claim to be considered the oldest law enforcement body still in existence.

Over time buildings were constructed next to the Abbey to house members of the upper class who sought sanctuary. One such building is the Abbey Strand. The tenants of these buildings were nicknamed 'Abbey Lairds' (one of the most famous being the Count of Artois later Charles X of France). Given the increasing population of the Abbey Sanctuary, and nature of the residents, the constables were soon required to enforce law and order within the precincts of the Palace and the Holyrood Abbey Sanctuary.

Law and order at the Palace and Abbey would be split between the hereditary Keeper of the Palace of Holyroodhouse (the Duke of Hamilton), the Bailie of Holyroodhouse and the High Constables who would answer to the Bailie. The Keeper of the Palace of Holyroodhouse appoints the Bailie of Holyroodhouse, who is responsible for law and order within the Holyrood Abbey Sanctuary. The High Constables of Holyroodhouse are responsible to the Keeper and enforce the justice of the Bailie. The senior officer of the High Constables is called the Moderator.

One of the historic duties of the High Constables is to assist and escort the Bailie as he undertakes to Perambulate the Bounds of the Abbey and its sanctuary, to ensure "no encroachments had taken place upon what has hitherto been known and ascertained as the boundaries of the Sanctuary".

=== Guard of Honour ===
The High Constables of the Abbey had performed partially ceremonial duties as far back as at least 1825 where they met to escort the remains of the Duchess of Grammont, companion of Charles X of France, from the Royal Vault to a French frigate in Leith. They had also undertaken duties as Guard of Honour during visits of Queen Victoria and on earlier occasions. However, it wasn't until 1863 that the role of Guard of Honour of the Palace of Holyroodhouse came to be vested in them alone. The Bailie of the Abbey noted that the Constables had previously been reluctant to take on the role because it required the carrying of a halberd, but that they would from then on discontinue the use of the halberd and substitute it for the baton. The Captain of the Guard was maintained as a separate role to the Moderator of the High Constables, and when the High Constables undertake duties as the Guard of Honour they do so under the command of the Captain of the Guard, not the Moderator.

After the Act of Union, Scottish peers could elect 16 of their number to sit as Scottish representative peer in the House of Lords at Westminster. The vote would take place at Holyrood Palace and the High Constables would ensure the peers were protected during the gathering, and that order was maintained during the election process. Over the years many Peers questioned the necessity of the High Constables and Guard of Honour at the proceedings, which the Bailie responded provided "the dignity and orderliness of the proceedings".

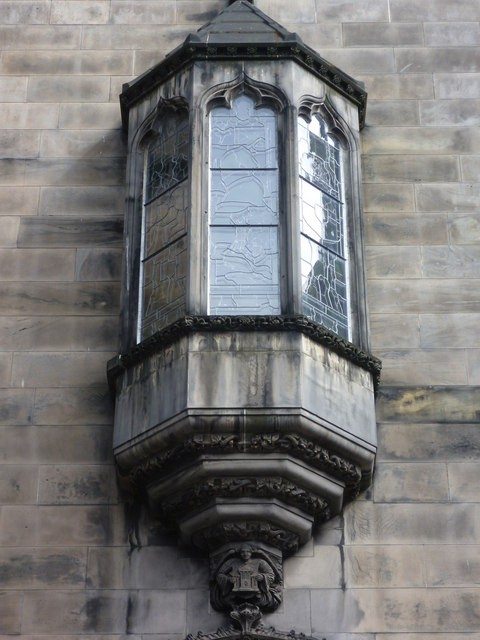
The Holyrood Constables Oriel window at St Giles'

During the restoration of St Giles' Cathedral in the 1880s, the High Constables donated a stained glass oriel window, in the south side-chapel. The window embodies the Royal Arms of Scotland, the arms of the Hereditary Keeper of the Palace of Holyroodhouse, symbolism of the Holyrood Abbey's founding legend, and insignia of the High Constables themselves.

== Structure ==
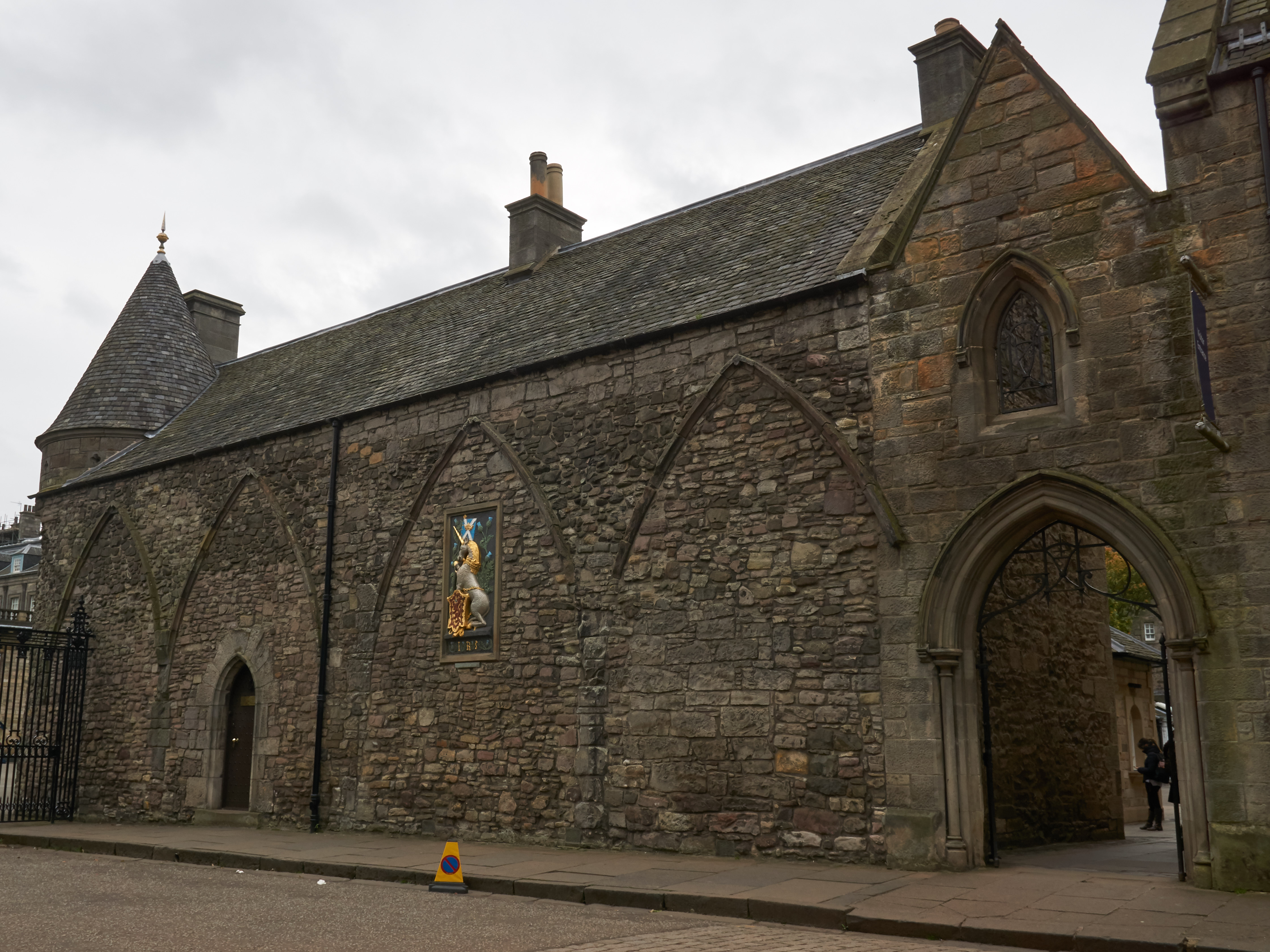
Abbey Court House, home of the High Constables

The number of High Constables sits at 30 (though this number has fluctuated historically). The High Constables themselves are appointed by the Bailie of Holyroodhouse. The Moderator is the head of the body, except for when they are undertaking duties as Guard of Honour (at which point it is the Captain of the Guard). The office of Vice Moderator was introduced in 1862, to be occupied by the retired Moderator. The role of Surgeon ranks after that of Secretary. Between 1869 and 1871 the office of Custodier of the Batons was created.

Honorary membership has occasionally been awarded, though infrequently, sometimes to previous High Constables (1861, 1890 and 1901). Occasionally honorary membership was given to the Lord Provost of Edinburgh.

The original home of the constables was the guardroom, until it was replaced in 1857. The home of the constables today is the Abbey Courthouse, which was restored in 1958 along with the old prison (refurbished into the Baillie's office).

== Today ==
Today the High Constables parade whenever the Sovereign, or the Lord High Commissioner to the General Assembly of the Church of Scotland, is in residence. They form part of the Royal Household in Scotland.

They provide a guard of honour for the King and his guests at the Palace, and at state functions such as banquets and garden parties.

Also present at the Palace of Holyroodhouse for such events is the Doorward Guard of Partizans, who comprised the personal retainers of the Lord High Constable of Scotland, responsible for the Sovereign's safety while in Edinburgh, and the Royal Company of Archers, a ceremonial unit that serves as the King's bodyguard in Scotland.

== Uniform ==
In 1910 King George V proposed for the High Constables a uniform of blue cloth with silver buttons and a distinctive blue hat turned up at one side.

Their ceremonial uniform today reflects the original and includes a blue velvet suit, a hat and a thin sword in a black leather scabbard.

== See also ==
- Yeomen Warders
