= Abbot of Holyrood =

The Abbot of Holyrood (later Commendator of Holyrood) was the head of the Augustinian monastic community of Holyrood Abbey, now in Edinburgh. The long history of the abbey came to a formal end in July 1606 when the parliament of Scotland turned the abbey into a secular lordship for the last commendator, John Bothwell (confirmed by charter in December 1607). The following is a list of abbots and commendators:

== List of abbots ==
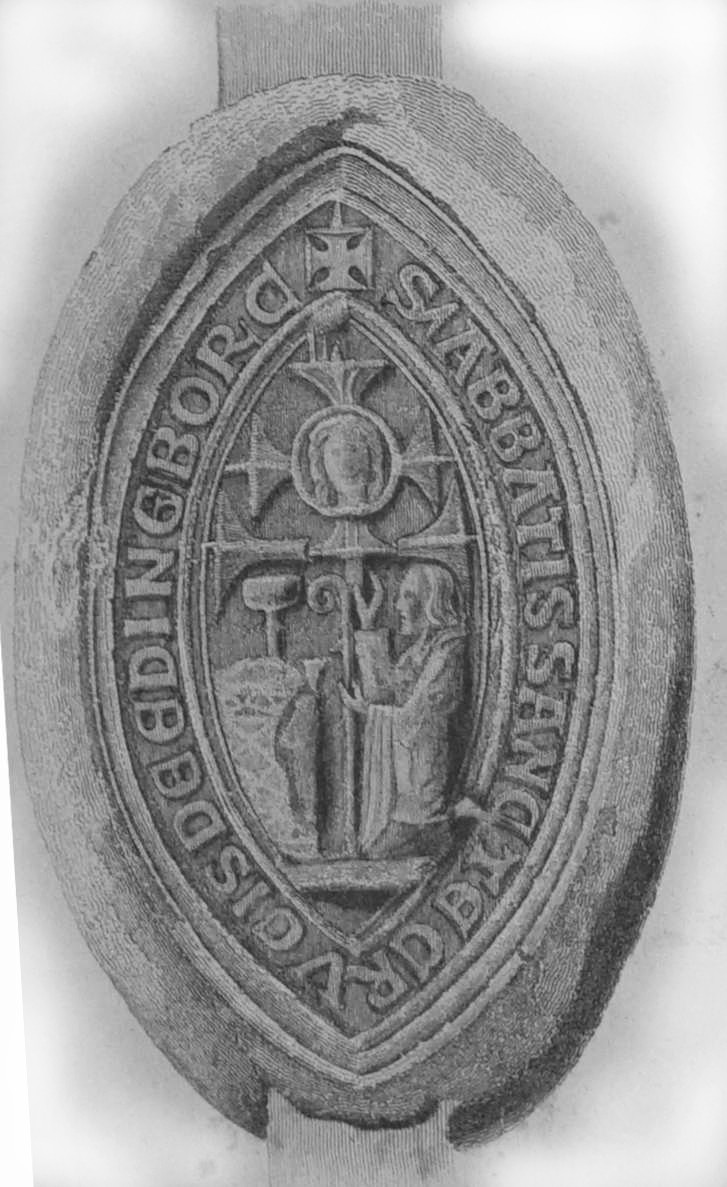
Seal of Adam

- Alwin, 1128-1151
- Osbert, 1151
- William (I), 1152-1172
- John, 1173-1178x1184
- William (II), 1187x1189-1206
- Walter, 1210-1217 or 1218
- William (III), 1217 x 1218-1221
- William (IV) son of "Owin", 1221-1227
- Gilbert, 1236
- Elias son of Nicholas, 1227-1236 x 1253
- Henry, 1236 x 1253-1255
- Radulf, 1253x1256-1258
- Robert, 1273 x1279
- William de Haddington, 1285
- Adam, 1291-1299
- Elias, 1309-1320 or 1321
- Simon de Wedale, 1321-1327
- John de Cambusnethan, 1328-1339
- Bartholomew, 1342
- Thomas de St Andrews, ?1347-1370
- John, 1370-1378
- David Bell, 1379-1386
- John de Leith, 1386-71415x1420
- Henry de Dryden, 1420-1423
  - Walter Bower, 1420
- Patrick Witherspoon (Wotherspoon), 1423-1445
- William, 1425
- James Cameron, 1446-1450
- Archibald Crawford, 1450-1484
- Robert Ballantyne, 1484-1500
- James Stewart, 1498-1500
- George Crichton, 1500-1526
- William Douglas, 1526-1528
- Robert Cairncross, 1528-1538
- David Douglas, 1530-1531

== List of commendators ==
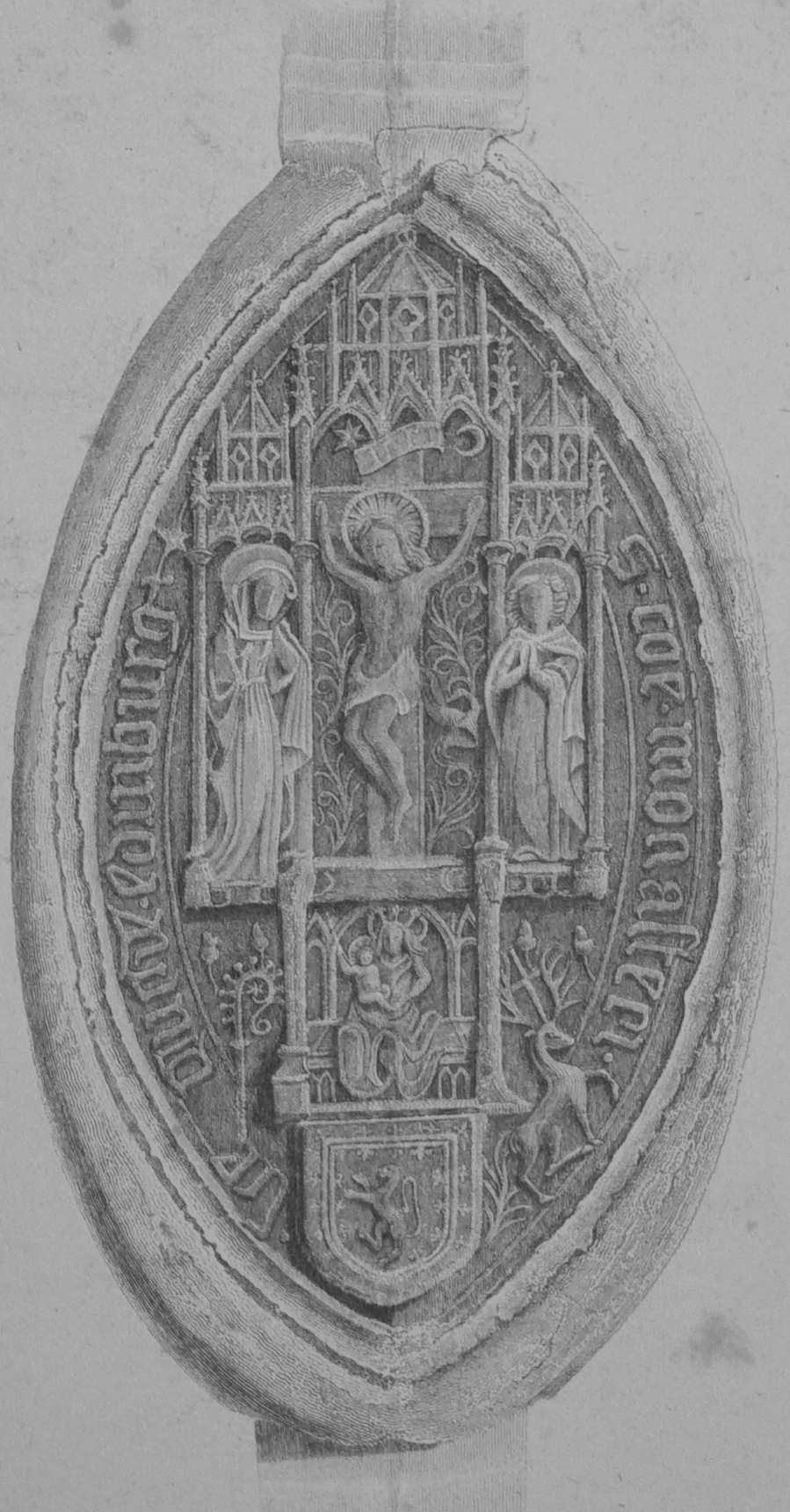
Seal of Robert Stewart abbot

- Robert Stewart, 1539-1568
- Adam Bothwell, 1568-1582
- John Bothwell, 1582-1606

== Bibliography ==
- Cowan, Ian B. & Easson, David E., Medieval Religious Houses: Scotland With an Appendix on the Houses in the Isle of Man, Second Edition, (London, 1976), pp. 90–1
- Watt, D.E.R. & Shead, N.F. (eds.), The Heads of Religious Houses in Scotland from the 12th to the 16th Centuries, The Scottish Records Society, New Series, Volume 24, (Edinburgh, 2001), pp. 92–6

== See also ==
- Holyrood Abbey
