= Henry of Holyrood =

- Bishop of Galloway
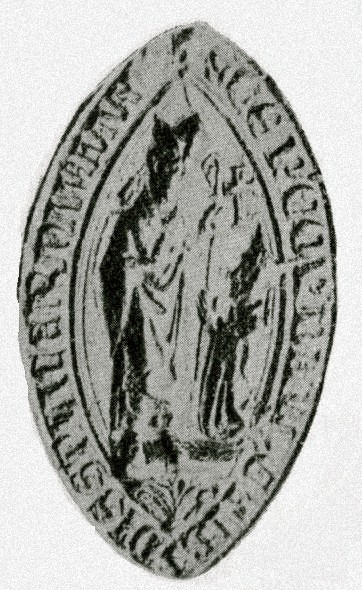
- Bishop Henry's seal
- Church: Roman Catholic Church
- See: Diocese of Galloway
- In office: 1253–1293
- Predecessor: Gilbert
- Successor: Thomas de Dalton
- Previous post(s): Abbot of Holyrood

Orders
- Consecration: 1255 or 1256

Personal details
- Born: unknown unknown
- Died: 1 November 1293

Henry (died 1293) was a 13th-century Augustinian abbot and bishop, most notable for holding the positions of Abbot of Holyrood and Bishop of Galloway.

It is not known when Henry became an Augustinian nor when he became Abbot of Holyrood Abbey. His latest known predecessor, Elias son of Nicholas, occurs as abbot on 29 May 1236, and no abbot of Holyrood is known from then until 1253 when the Chronicle of Melrose informs us that "Sir Gilbert, the bishop of Whithorn, died; and after him, sir Henry, the abbot of Holyrood, was elected".

This date is not however certain, as Henry's name occurs merely as Abbot, not even "bishop-elect", in a Dunfermline Abbey document dated to October 1254. He was elected with the support of the Comyn faction who at that time dominated the minority of the young King Alexander III of Scotland, an election that John I de Balliol initially opposed, with Balliol citing the "ancient liberty of his subjects", i.e. the rights of the Lord of Galloway and the Galwegians. This objection is at first sight confusing, since John de Balliol himself was a Comyn ally and part of the Comyn regime. Richard Oram argues that Balliol's objection was more concerned with his own rights of patronage, but at any rate Balliol's objections came to nothing.

There was an examination of the election at York on 11 February 1255, and the election was apparently confirmed by the Archbishop of York on 24 February; there was however a delay in consecration of the bishop, as the report of his consecration in the Melrose Chronicle follows that of Gamelin as Bishop of St Andrews, which took place on 25 December 1255. The sources give contradictory accounts of the consecration, with the Melrose Chronicle stating that it was conducted by Walter de Gray (d. 1 May 1255), whereas the Lanercost Chronicle reported that the consecration, conducted by Walter of Kirkham, the Bishop of Durham, took place on 7 February 1255, at St Agatha's near Richmond. D. E. R. Watt thinks that the consecration may in fact have taken place in early 1256.

He was a witness to the foundation charter of Sweetheart Abbey, dated April 1273. The Archbishop of York, in 1287, authorised that Bishop Henry, because of his old age, be excused from the annual visit to York usually paid by bishops of Galloway. The bishop was nevertheless able to visit Ireland, where on 4 August 1291, his presence was recorded. He was at Birgham on 17 March 1290, for the negotiation of the Treaty of Birgham. He was one of the men chosen by John de Balliol the younger, afterwards King John of Scotland, to represent him at the Great Cause in 1292. He died on 1 November 1293. He had been described by the Lanercost Chronicle as "a man discreet, holy, and provident for his house and his parish".

An excavation of Whithorn Priory during 1957-67 uncovered the remains of various senior ecclesiastical figures whose identities were not known at the time. Research funded by Historic Scotland in 2007 led to the identification of six bishops from the bones and artefacts in the graves, Henry amongst them. The techniques employed allowed the researchers to conclude that all the clerics enjoyed a diet of quality meat and fish and probably came from southern Scotland or Cumbria. Henry's grave also contained "very fine gilded altar vessels, a gold pontifical ring, and the remains of a wooden crozier". The analysis enable researchers to conclude that Henry had taken a role in rebuilding parts of the priory after it was damaged by soldiers in 1286 and that he had been suffering from tooth abscesses.

== Notes ==
Religious titles
Preceded by Elias fitz Nicholas	Abbot of Holyrood; 1236 x 1253–1255	Succeeded by Radulf
Preceded by Gilbert	Bishop of Galloway; 1253–1293	Succeeded by Thomas de Dalton
