= Whithorn Priory =

Monastery in Dumfries and Galloway, Scotland

Coordinates: 54°44′01″N 4°25′04″W

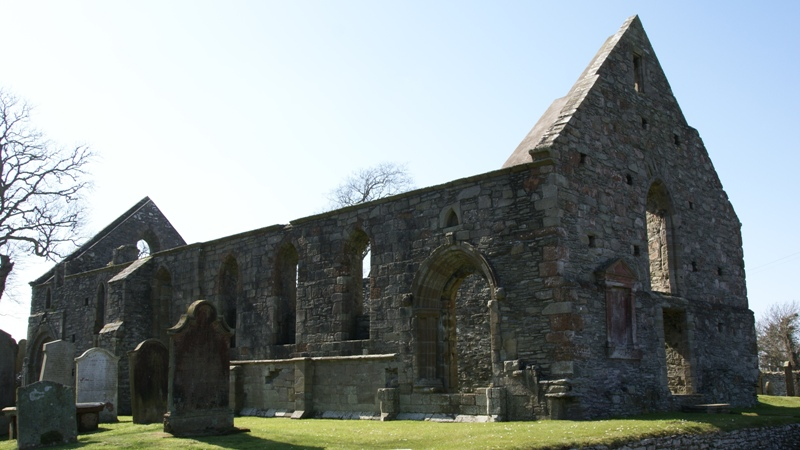
Whithorn Priory: the nave of the cathedral

Whithorn Priory was a medieval Scottish monastery that also served as a cathedral, located at 6 Bruce Street in Whithorn, Wigtownshire, Dumfries and Galloway (54.7357N, 4.415954W; OS grid reference NX445405).

== History ==
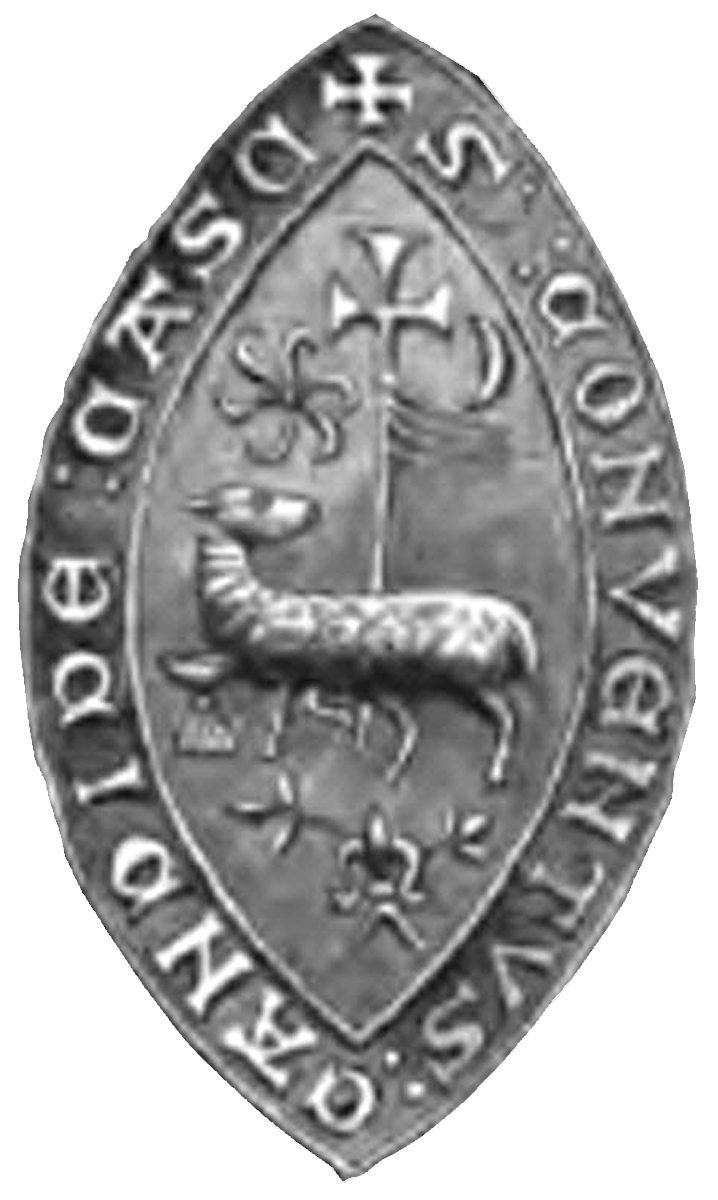
Seal of the Priory of Whithorn.

The priory was founded about the middle of the 12th century by Fergus, the Lord of Galloway, during the reign of King David I of Scotland, initially for a community of Augustinian canons regular. Around 1175, the monks were replaced by Premonstratensian canons regular, referred to colloquially in Britain as the White Canons. Sometime before 1161, the Premonstratensians had been established at Soulseat Abbey.

The canons of Whithorn formed the cathedral chapter of the Diocese of Galloway, which was re-established about the same time, also by Fergus, the old succession of bishops having died out in the 8th or 9th centuries. The prior stood next in rank to the bishop, as can be seen from the order of signatories to an episcopal charter early in the 13th century; and the community enjoyed the right of electing the bishop, although this right was occasionally overruled in favour of the secular clergy by the Archbishop of York, of which see Galloway was a suffragan see for several centuries.

The full list of priors has not been preserved. Among them were: Maurice, who swore fealty to King Edward I of England in 1296; Gavin Dunbar (1514), who rose to be Archbishop of Glasgow; and James Beaton, successively Archbishop of Glasgow and of St. Andrews, and chancellor of the kingdom. Whithorn was long a noted place of pilgrimage, owing to its connection with the venerated memory of Saint Ninian.

Many Scottish sovereigns, among them Margaret of Denmark (queen of James III), James IV and Margaret Tudor, and James V, made repeated pilgrimages to the saint's shrine, and left rich offerings behind them. Mary of Guise planned to come in pilgrimage in August 1548. The monastery became opulent, and its income at its dissolution under the Scottish Reformation was estimated at over £1000. Possibly as a result, the priory was put under the rule of a commendatory prior in 1516. The last Catholic prior, Malcolm Fleming (d. 1568), was committed to prison in 1563 for the crime of saying Mass.

Mary, Queen of Scots, travelled to Whithorn from Glenluce Abbey on 10 August 1563. Her French kitchen clerk, unused to Scottish placenames, recorded the location as "Coustourne".

The whole property of the priory was vested in the Crown by the annexation act of 1587, and was granted in 1606 by King James VI to the occupant of the See of Galloway when he established Episcopalianism in Scotland that year.

== Dissolution ==
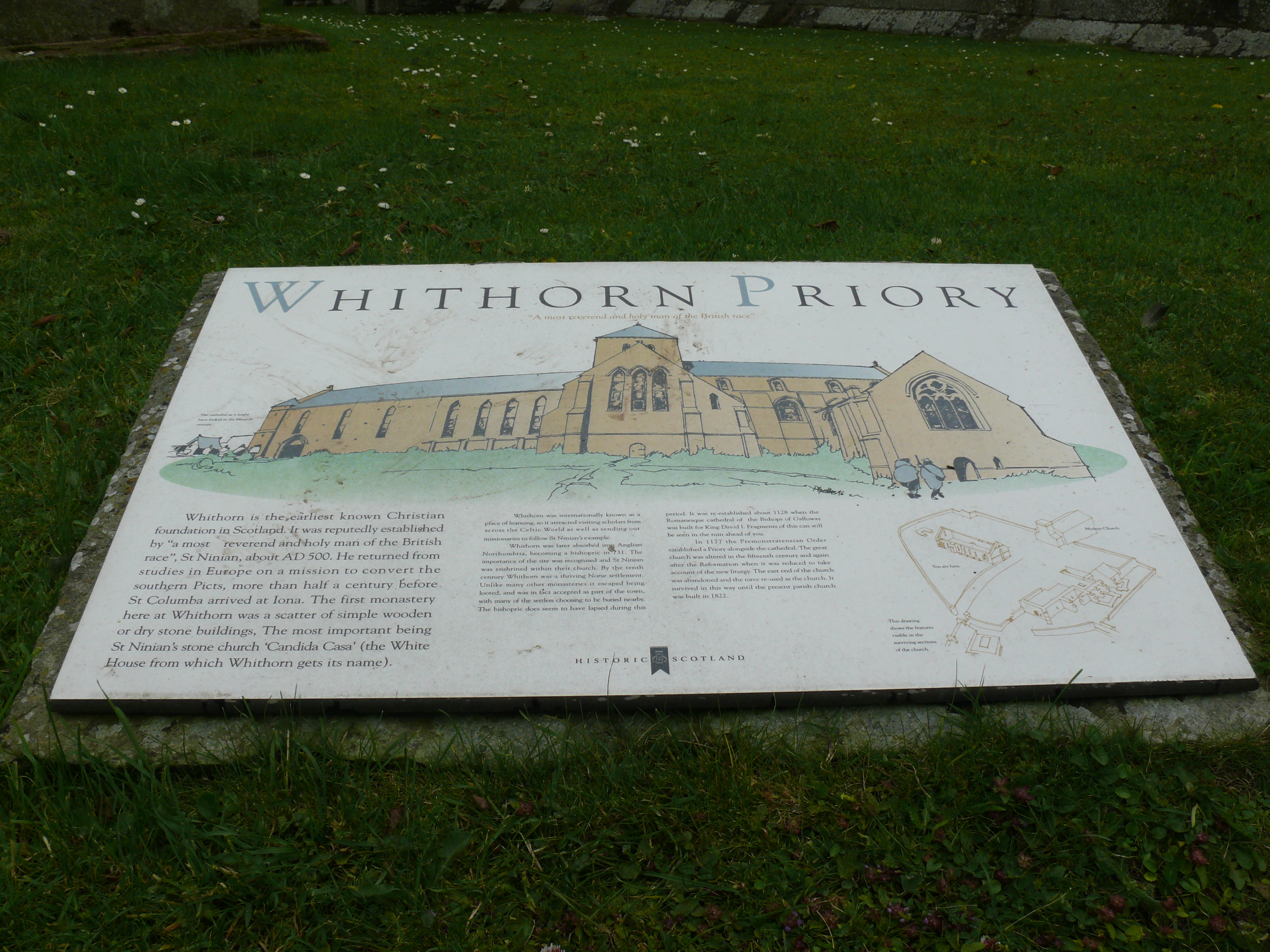
Informational plaque by Historic Scotland

The monastery lands continued to belong to the bishopric until the Revolution of 1688, at which time that see was the richest in the kingdom next to St. Andrews and Glasgow. The priory church, which served also as the cathedral of the diocese, had a long nave without aisles, a choir of about the same length, and a lady chapel beyond. Thomas Sydserf, Bishop of Galloway 1635–8, undertook an ambitious remodelling of the nave.

In 1684 the nave and western tower were still intact, but the existing remains consist only of the roofless nave and the extensive vaulted crypts constructed under the eastern end of the church. The 3rd Marquess of Bute carried out such restoration as was possible.

The complex is now a scheduled monument.

== Excavation ==
The cathedral was subject to a major excavation and restoration in 1886/7 by William Galloway at the expense of the 3rd Marquess of Bute.

== Burials ==
- Walter of Whithorn
- Henry of Holyrood
- Simon de Wedale
- Archibald Douglas, 5th Earl of Angus (heart buried at Douglas, South Lanarkshire)

== Gallery ==
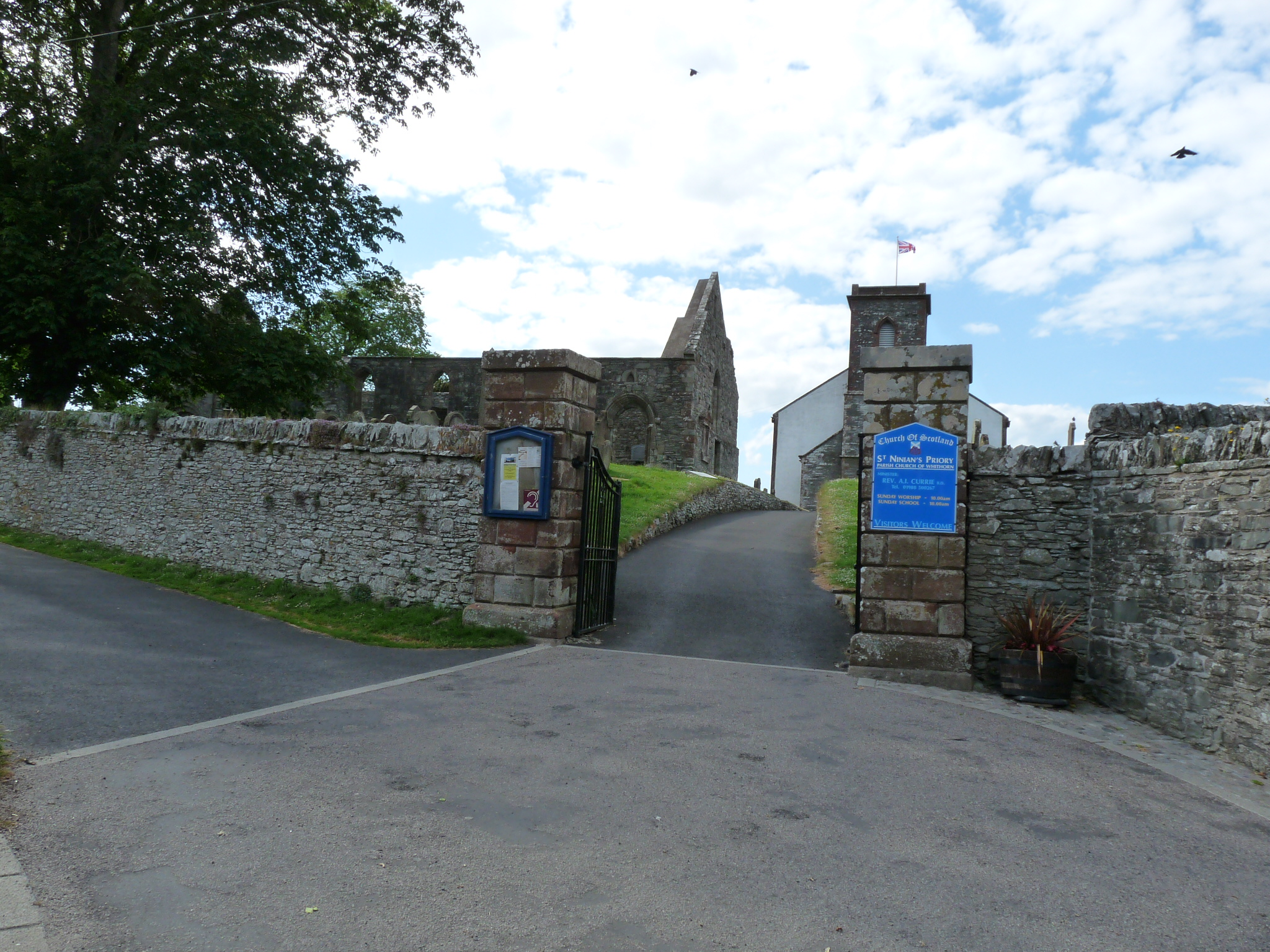
St. Ninian's Priory from Bruce Street

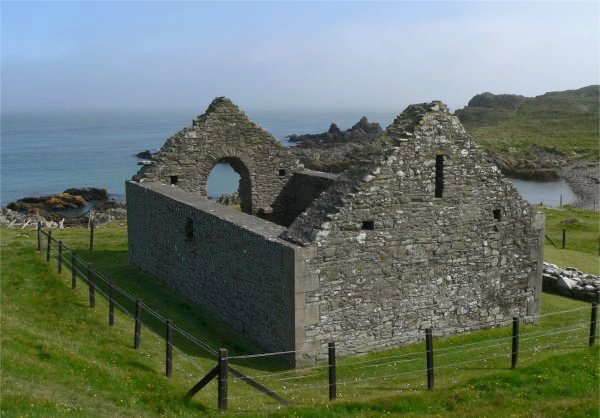
Saint Ninian's Chapel

== See also ==
- Church of Scotland
- Scottish Episcopal Church
- Roman Catholic Church in Scotland
- Prior of Whithorn, for a list of priors and commendators
- Isle of Whithorn
