= Simon de Wedale =

- Bishop of Galloway
- Church: Roman Catholic Church
- See: Diocese of Galloway
- In office: 1326–1355
- Predecessor: Thomas de Kirkcudbright
- Successor: Michael MacKenlagh
- Previous post: Abbot of Holyrood

Orders
- Consecration: 1 February 1327

Personal details
- Born: unknown Probably southern Scotland (Stow of Wedale?)
- Died: 11 March 1355

Simon de Wedale was a 14th-century Augustinian canon who rose to become Abbot of Holyrood and then Bishop of Galloway. Little is known of Simon until he appears on 27 February 1321 as Abbot of Holyrood Abbey near Edinburgh. His accession to this abbacy had only been recent, since either in January of this year or in January 1320, his predecessor Elias, ruling the abbey since at least 1309 and probably earlier, was still abbot. Abbot Simon occurs again in the records on 10 June 1326.

On 23 September 1326, Simon was elected to succeed the recently deceased Thomas de Kirkcudbright as Bishop of Galloway. This election was confirmed by Galloway's metropolitan the Archbishop of York on 16 December, allowing Simon to receive consecration, which was conducted at Westminster by the bishops of Lichfield, Carlisle, and Llandaff on 1 February 1327; Simon made his profession of obedience to the Archbishop of York at Tottenham on 8 February.

Little is known of his 19-year episcopate. He granted the parish church of Crossmichael to Sweetheart Abbey on 21 September 1331. Bishop Simon may have been present at the parliament of Edward Balliol on 10 February 1334, but if so his name was incorrectly recorded as Henry. He was granted a protection by King Edward III of England on 1 November 1335. He occurs in a Holyrood Abbey document dated to 11 November 1345. On 18 October 1347, he is recorded assigning tithes from the church of Buittle between its vicar and Sweetheart. He died on 11 March 1355. Perhaps in anticipation of Bishop Simon's impending death, John II, King of France, had petitioned for a plenary indulgence on Simon's behalf, a petition which was granted by Pope Innocent IV on 18 June 1354.

An excavation of Whithorn Priory during 1957-67 uncovered the remains of various senior ecclesiastical figures whose identities were not known at the time. Research funded by Historic Scotland in 2007 led to the identification of six bishops from the bones and artefacts in the graves, Bishop Simon amongst them. The techniques employed allowed the researchers to conclude that all the clerics enjoyed a diet of quality meat and fish and probably came from southern Scotland or Cumbria. The grave identified as Simon's also contained a gilded and enamelled crozier dating from 1175, silver altar vessels, brocade threads and gilded sequins from a headdress.

== Notes ==
Religious titles
Preceded by Elias	Abbot of Holyrood; 1321–1327	Succeeded by John de Cambusnethan
Preceded by Thomas de Kirkcudbright	Bishop of Galloway; 1326–1355	Succeeded by Michael MacKenlagh
