= Bailie of Holyroodhouse =

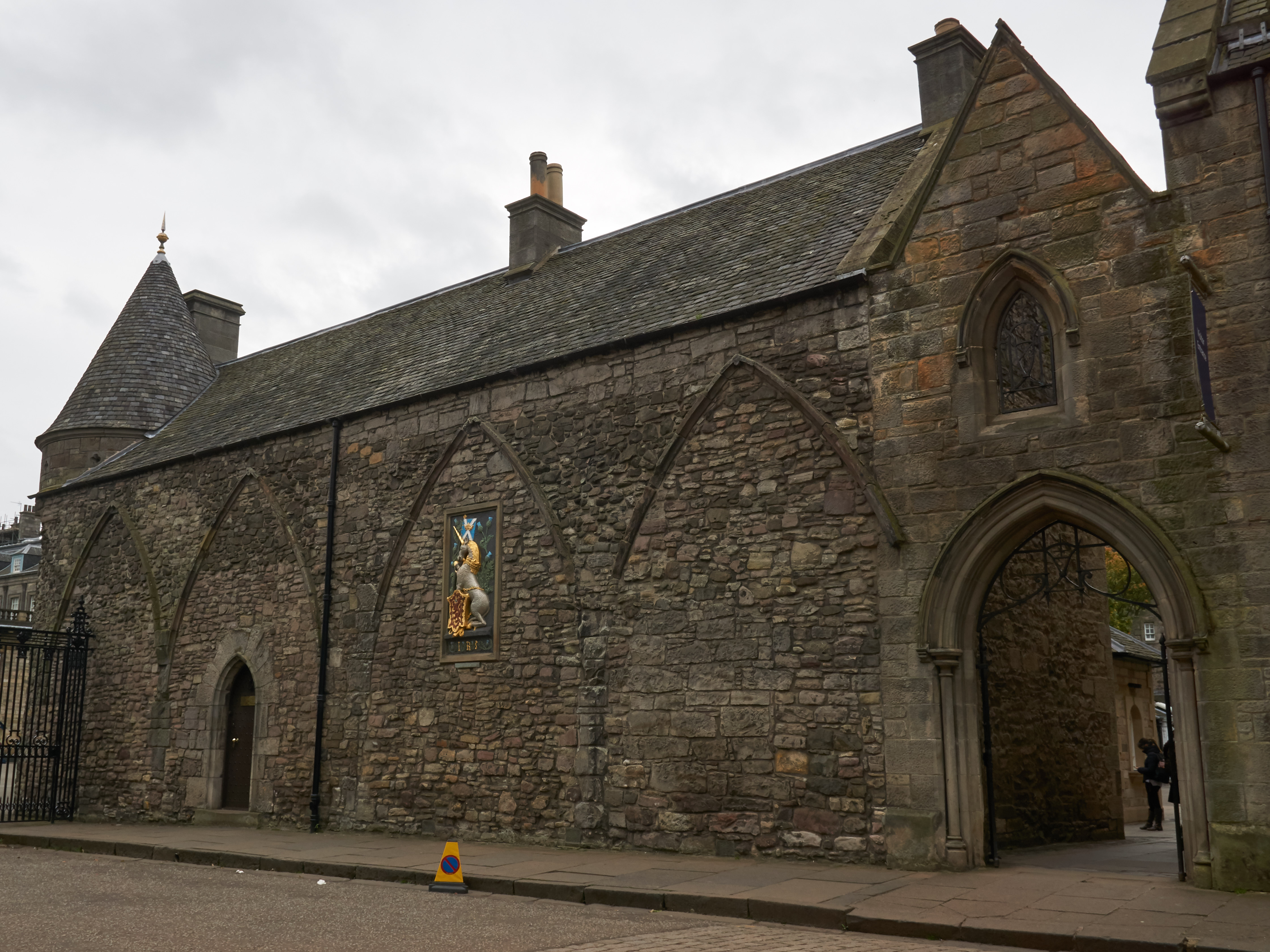
The Abbey Court House, Holyroodhouse

The Bailie of Holyroodhouse (or Bailie of the Palace of Holyroodhouse) is a judicial officer who presides over the Abbey Court at Holyrood Palace in Edinburgh. His or her duties are now largely ceremonial.

== History ==
In the medieval period, religious houses provided sanctuary for fugitive criminals under certain circumstances. Churchmen and legislators varied in their understanding of these circumstances; in 1535, therefore, the Parliament of Scotland decreed that a bailie should be appointed to every place of sanctuary in order to uphold its interpretation of the law and to preserve good order within the precincts.

At the Reformation, all religious sanctuaries in Scotland were abolished. There was, however, by long tradition, an additional right of sanctuary connected with royal palaces, and therefore the Palace of Holyroodhouse retained its status as a place of sanctuary. The sanctuary of the king's palace provided protection against imprisonment for debt only, however; to criminals the sanctuary afforded no protection. (Indeed, the 1535 statue had expressly forbidden the bailies of sanctuaries to protect 'trespassers', but rather ordered them 'to put them forth from the sanctuary to the vengeance of the common law'.) By the 19th century the Palace of Holyroodhouse was 'the only spot in Scotland privileged against the execution of diligence'.

The bailie had jurisdiction over those living within the area of sanctuary, which included Holyrood Park and the Abbey grounds, acting as judge in all matters, criminal and civil, which came before his court. The Abbey Court was exempted from legislation passed in 1747, which greatly restricted the judicial powers of other baronial courts in Scotland, and through the 18th century the bailie continued to sit weekly to settle disputes between persons residing in the area of his jurisdiction. Initially the Abbey Court sat in rooms in the palace itself; then from 1746 it sat in the guardroom, at the Abbey gate, which in 1857 was replaced by the current building (by Robert Matheson).

The Debtors (Scotland) Act 1880 abolished imprisonment for debt in most circumstances, which in turn removed the impetus for debtors to seek sanctuary. The Abbey Court, however, continued to sit once a month (at 2pm on the first Saturday of the month); its personnel, in addition to the bailie, included a Procurator fiscal, a Clerk and an Officer.

In 1958, the former prison associated with the court was converted to serve as the Bailie's Room. Until 1963, the bailie presided over the election of Scottish representative peers to the Westminster parliament.

== Present day ==
Since the 1960s, the court has sat quarterly, though this is more of a social gathering than a legal sitting. The Bailie is appointed by the Duke of Hamilton as Hereditary Keeper of the Palace of Holyroodhouse; he or she wears a robe of office (usually over morning dress), together with a cocked hat, and carries a ceremonial baton. The bailie oversees the High Constables and Guard of Honour of the Palace of Holyroodhouse and must approve those elected to serve as its officers. Together with the High Constables, he is usually on duty for the ceremony of the keys, investitures and other ceremonial events taking place in or around the palace, and he is required to be present to greet the King, the Lord High Commissioner to the General Assembly of the Church of Scotland and visiting foreign dignitaries on their arrival at the palace.

The bailie retains a vestigial responsibility for 'eliminating disturbances and quelling any turbulence' within the palace precincts.

== See also ==
- Holyrood Palace
- High Constables and Guard of Honour of the Palace of Holyroodhouse
