= List of monarchs of the British Isles by cause of death =

Monarchs of the British Isles are listed here, grouped by the type of death and then ordered by the date of death. The monarchical status of some people is disputed, but they have been included here for completeness.

== Natural causes ==
Monarchs assumed to have died through natural causes (through disease)
Name	House	Born	Reign	Death	Notes
Kenneth I MacAlpin	House of Alpin (Scotland)	810	843–858	8 February 858 (aged 47-48)	Tumour
Donald I	House of Alpin (Scotland)	unknown	858–862	13 April 862	According to the Chronicle of the Kings of Alba, died "at the palace of Cinnbelathoir", possibly near or at Scone, probably from natural causes.
Alfred the Great	West Saxons (England)	c. 849	871–899	26 October 899 (aged 50–52)	Married to Ealhswith in 868. Father of Edward the Elder.
Ælfweard	West Saxons (England)		924	2 August 924 (aged 21–22)	Apparently natural causes
Athelstan	West Saxons (England)	c. 895	924–939	27 October 939 (aged ~45)	Died at Gloucester, apparently natural causes
Edwy the Fair	West Saxons (England)	c. 941	955–959	1 October 959 (aged ~19)	Presumed to be natural causes
Constantine II	House of Alpin (Scotland)	before 879	900–943	952 (aged 73-74)	
Eadred	West Saxons (England)	c. 923	946–955	23 November 955 (aged c. 32)	Suffered a "digestive malady" in later life
Edgar the Peaceable	West Saxons (England)	c. 943	959–975	8 July 975 (aged 31/32)	
Ethelred II the Unready	West Saxons (England)	c. 968	978–1013; 1014–1016	23 April 1016 (aged ~50)	
Sweyn Forkbeard	West Saxons (England)	Danish Kings (England)	17 April 963	1013–1014	3 February 1014 (aged 50)
Cnut the Great	Danish Kings (England)	c. 995	1016–1035	12 November 1035 (aged ~45)	
Harold I Harefoot	Danish Kings (England)	c. 1015	1035–1040	17 March 1040	
Harthacnut	Danish Kings (England)	1018	1040–1042	8 June 1042 (aged 23-24)	Apparently died from a stroke brought on by heavy drinking
St Edward the Confessor	West Saxon Restoration (England)	c. 1004	1042–1066	4 January 1066 (aged 60-63)	In the last months of his life he suffered several strokes and was too frail in late 1065 to consecrate Westminster, which he built.
Edgar	House of Dunkeld (Scotland)	1074	1097–1107	8 January 1107	
Alexander I	House of Dunkeld (Scotland)	c. 1078	1107–1124	23 April 1124 (aged 45)	
Edgar the Atheling	West Saxon Restoration (England)	c. 1051	1066	c. 1126	Proclaimed by surviving English nobles, clerics and magnates, but never crowned, as the Normans approached after Hastings.
Henry I	The Normans (England)	c. September 1068	1100–1135	1 December 1135 (aged ~67)	Died of food poisoning from eating "a surfeit of lampreys"
David I	House of Dunkeld (Scotland)	1084	1124–1153	24 May 1153 (aged 68-69)	Died of illness.
Stephen of Blois	House of Blois (England)	c. 1096	1135–1154	25 October 1154 (aged ~58)	Stomach disease
Malcolm IV	House of Dunkeld (Scotland)	23 April/24 May 1141	1153–1165	9 December 1165 (aged 24)	His premature death may have been hastened by osteitis deformans.
Matilda (Empress Maud)	Angevins or Plantagenets (England)	February 1102	1141	10 September 1167 (aged 65)	
Henry II	Angevins or Plantagenets (England)	5 March 1133	1154–1189	6 July 1189 (aged 56)	He collapsed into shock and fever and eventually died.
William I	House of Dunkeld (Scotland)	c. 1143	1165–1214	4 December 1214 (aged 71-72)	Natural causes
John "Lackland"	Monarchs of England and Ireland (England)	24 December 1166	1199–1216	19 October 1216 (aged 49)	Retreating from the French invasion, John crossed the marshy area known as The Wash in East Anglia and eventually died from dysentery.
Alexander II	House of Dunkeld (Scotland)	24 August 1198	1214–1249	6 July 1249 (aged 50)	Died after suffering a fever on the Isle of Kerrera in the Inner Hebrides.
Henry III	Monarchs of England and Ireland (England)	1 October 1207	1216–1272	16 November 1272 (aged 65)	Died of illness.
Margaret	House of Sverre Dunkeld (Scotland)	9 April 1283	1286–1290	26 September 1290 (aged 7)	Food poisoning and sea sickness.
Edward I "Longshanks"	House of Plantagenet (England)	17 June 1239	1272–1307	7 July 1307 (aged 68)	Dysentery (confirmed); cancer (possible)
John Balliol	House of Balliol (Scotland)	c. 1249	1292–1296	c. November 1314 (aged ~65)	Natural causes
Robert I the Bruce	House of Bruce (Scotland)	11 July 1274	1306–1329	7 June 1329 (aged 54)	Suffered for some years from what some contemporary accounts describe as an "unclean ailment"; the traditional story is that he died of leprosy, but this is disputed. Other suggestions include syphilis, psoriasis, and a series of strokes.
Edward Balliol	House of Balliol (Scotland)	c. 1283	1332–1336	c. 1364 (aged ~81)	Natural causes
David II	House of Bruce (Scotland)	5 March 1324	1329–1371	22 February 1371 (aged 46)	Natural causes
Edward III	Monarchs of England and Ireland (England)	13 November 1312	1327–1377	21 June 1377 (aged 64)	Died of a stroke
Robert II	House of Stuart (Scotland)	2 March 1316	1371–1390	19 April 1390 (aged 74)	Died of old age.
Robert III	House of Stuart (Scotland)	c. 1340	1390–1406	4 April 1406 (aged 68-69)	Death said to have been caused by the shock of hearing that his son James (later King James I of Scotland) had been captured by the English.
Henry IV	House of Lancaster (England)	c. April 1367	1399–1413	20 March 1413 (aged 45)	Several years of ill health: some type of visible skin ailment. Leprosy is also rumoured to have been possible.
Henry V	House of Lancaster (England)	16 September 1386	1413–1422	31 August 1422 (aged 35)	Natural causes, probably dysentery
Edward IV	House of York (England)	28 April 1442	1461–1470; 1471–1483	9 April 1483 (aged 40)	Unclear, possibly apoplexy brought on by excess.
Henry VII	House of Tudor (England)	28 January 1457	1485–1509	21 April 1509 (aged 52)	Tuberculosis
James V	House of Stuart (Scotland)	10 April 1512	1513–1542	14 December 1542 (aged 30)	Died of ill health shortly after the Battle of Solway Moss
Henry VIII	House of Tudor (England)	28 June 1491	1509–1547	28 January 1547 (aged 55)	Suffered from gout and obesity. Obesity dates from a jousting accident in 1536 in which he suffered a leg wound. This prevented him from exercising and gradually became ulcerated. Also possibly suffered from syphilis and/or diabetes
Edward VI	House of Tudor (England)	12 October 1537	1547–1553	6 July 1553 (aged 15)	Tuberculosis, arsenic poisoning, or congenital syphilis?
Mary I	House of Tudor (England)	18 February 1516	1553–1558	17 November 1558 (aged 42)	Possibly ovarian cancer
Philip	House of Habsburg (England)	21 May 1527	1554–1558	13 September 1598 (aged 71)	Cancer
Elizabeth I	House of Tudor (England)	7 September 1533	1558–1603	24 March 1603 (aged 69)	Suffered from frailty and insomnia
James VI and I	House of Stuart	19 June 1566	1567–1625 (Scotland); 1603-1625 (England)	27 March 1625 (aged 58)	Suffered from senility and died of 'tertian ague', probably brought on by kidney failure and a stroke
Oliver Cromwell	(Interregnum)	25 April 1599	1653-1658	3 September 1658 (aged 59)	Struck by a sudden bout of malarial fever, followed directly by an attack of urinary/kidney symptoms.
Charles II	House of Stuart	29 May 1630	1660–1685 England; 1649–1651 and 1660–1685 Scotland (1649–1685 de jure)	6 February 1685 (aged 54)	Died suddenly of uremia
James II and VII	House of Stuart	14 October 1633	1685–1688	16 September 1701 (aged 67)	Stroke
Mary II	House of Stuart	30 April 1662	1689–1694	28 December 1694 (aged 32)	Died of smallpox at Kensington Palace
Richard Cromwell	(Interregnum)	4 October 1626	1658-1659	12 July 1712 (aged 85)	The longest-lived British head of state until Elizabeth II.
Anne	House of Stuart	6 February 1665	1702–1714	1 August 1714 (aged 49)	Died of suppressed gout, ending in erysipelas, an abscess and fever. Her 17 ill-fated pregnancies perhaps ravaged her body.
George I	House of Hanover	28 May 1660	1714–1727	11 June 1727 (aged 67)	Stroke
George II	House of Hanover	30 October 1683	1727–1760	25 October 1760 (aged 76)	Aortic dissection while on the toilet
George III	House of Hanover	4 June 1738	1760–1820	29 January 1820 (aged 81)	Porphyria (disputed), a genetic disorder. Suffered bouts of mental illness from 1788 onwards.
George IV	House of Hanover	12 August 1762	1820–1830	26 June 1830 (aged 67)	Upper gastrointestinal bleeding caused by the rupture of gastric varices. Developed cataracts, alcoholism, opioid dependence, obesity, gout, oedema, arteriosclerosis and possibly porphyria and cancer.
William IV	House of Hanover	21 August 1765	1830–1837	20 June 1837 (aged 71)	Congestive heart failure and bronchopneumonia.
Victoria	House of Hanover	24 May 1819	1837–1901	22 January 1901 (aged 81)	Age and heart failure
Edward VII	House of Saxe-Coburg-Gotha	9 November 1841	1901–1910	6 May 1910 (aged 68)	Bed-ridden by bronchitis; died of a myocardial infarction
George VI	House of Windsor	14 December 1895	1936–1952	6 February 1952 (aged 56)	Had lung cancer and arteriosclerosis due to heavy cigarette smoking; died in his sleep of a coronary thrombosis
Edward VIII	House of Windsor	23 June 1894	1936	28 May 1972 (aged 77)	Throat cancer
Elizabeth II	House of Windsor	21 April 1926	1952–2022	8 September 2022 (aged 96)	Old age though some reports suggest multiple myeloma; died in Balmoral Castle, Scotland

== Killed ==
=== In battle ===
Monarchs who died in battle, either as the antagonist or otherwise
Name	House	Born	Reign	Death	Notes	
Constantine I	House of Alpin (Scotland)	unknown	862–877	877	Killed fighting the Viking army	
Edward the Elder	West Saxons (England)	c. 874–877	899–924	17 July 924	Died leading an army against a Cambro-Mercian rebellion at Farndon-Upon-Dee	
Malcolm I	House of Alpin (Scotland)	before 900	943–954	954	The Annals of Ulster merely note that he was killed in 954. Other sources place his death in Kincardineshire or at Blervie Castle.	
Donald II	House of Alpin (Scotland)	House of Alpin (Scotland)		889–900		According to the Chronicle of the Kings of Alba, killed in battle against Vikings at Dunnottar.
Indulf	House of Alpin (Scotland)		954–962	962	Killed fighting Vikings near Cullen	
Constantine III	House of Alpin (Scotland)	before 971	995–997	997	Killed in battle against other Scots near the River Almond (either in Perthshire or in Lothian).	
Kenneth III	House of Alpin (Scotland)	before 967	997–1005	1005 (aged 38-39)	Killed in battle at Strathearn by Malcolm II	
Malcolm II	c. 980	1005-1034	25 November 1034 (aged ~54)	Killed fighting "fratricides"		
Duncan I	House of Dunkeld (Scotland)	unknown	1034–1040	15 August 1040 (aged ~38)	Killed by his own men led by Macbeth at Pitgaveny near Elgin	
Macbeth	House of Moray (Scotland)	c. 1005	1040–1057	15 August 1057 (~52)	Defeated and mortally wounded by Máel Coluim mac Donnchada at the Battle of Lumphanan, dying at Scone.	
Harold II Godwinson	West Saxon Restoration (England)	c. 1022	1066	14 October 1066 (aged ~44)	Killed at the Battle of Hastings	
William I, the Conqueror	The Normans (England)	c. 1028	1066–1087	9 September 1087 (aged ~59)	Died at the Convent of St Gervais, near Rouen, France, from abdominal injuries received from his saddle pommel when he fell off a horse at the Siege of Mantes.	
Malcolm III	House of Dunkeld (Scotland)	c. 1031	1058–1093	13 November 1093 (aged ~62)	Ambushed by Robert de Mowbray, Earl of Northumbria, near Alnwick	
Richard I, the Lionheart	Angevins or Plantagenets (England)	8 September 1157	1189–1199	6 April 1199 (aged 41)	Died during a siege of the castle of Châlus-Charbrol in Limousin, France, facing a rebellion by the Viscount of Limoges and his half-brother, the Count of Angoulême.	
James II	House of Stuart (Scotland)	16 October 1430	1437–1460	3 August 1460 (aged 29)	An early-adopter of artillery, James was killed when a cannon exploded while attacking one of the last Scottish castles still held by the English after the Wars of Independence.	
Richard III	House of York (England)	2 October 1452	1483–1485	22 August 1485 (aged 32)	Killed at the Battle of Bosworth Field. Last English king to be killed in battle.	
James III	House of Stuart (Scotland)	10 July 1451/May 1452	1460–1488	11 June 1488 (aged 36)	Killed at the Battle of Sauchieburn while fighting an army raised by disaffected nobles, former councillors, and his son, the future James IV of Scotland.	
James IV	House of Stuart (Scotland)	17 March 1473	1488–1513	9 September 1513 (aged 40)	Killed at the Battle of Flodden while attacking the English	

=== Murdered, assassinated, executed or euthanised ===
Monarchs who were murdered, assassinated, executed away from the battlefield, or euthanised by their doctors
Name	House	Born	Reign	Death	Notes
Áed	House of Alpin (Scotland)	unknown	877–878	878	Killed by his successor, Giric
Edmund I	West Saxons (England)	c. 921	939–946	26 May 946 (aged 24-26)	Murdered at a party in Pucklechurch by Leofa, an exiled thief
Dub	House of Alpin (Scotland)		962–967	967	Killed in internal strife by Cuilén, possibly at Forres.
Cuilén	House of Alpin (Scotland)		967–971	971	Killed in Lothian when the hall he was in was burnt to the ground
Amlaíb	House of Alpin (Scotland)		971–977	977	Killed by Kenneth II
St Edward the Martyr	West Saxons (England)	c. 962	975–978	18 March 978 (aged ~16)	Killed at Corfe Castle by his stepmother Ælfthryth or one of her party. Canonised as Saint Edward the Martyr in 1001.
Kenneth II	House of Alpin (Scotland)		971–? 977–995	995	Assassinated; tradition states that he was killed at Fettercairn at the instigation of Fionnguala, daughter of Cuncar of Angus.
Lulach	House of Moray (Scotland)	before 1033	1057–1058	17 March 1058 (aged 25/26)	Assassinated and succeeded by Malcolm III
Duncan II	House of Dunkeld (Scotland)	before 1069	1094	12 November 1094	Killed by Máel Petair of Mearns
Edward II	Monarchs of England and Ireland (England)	25 April 1284	1307–1327	21 September 1327 (aged 43)	Supposedly murdered in Berkeley Castle in Gloucestershire after a metal tube (or, in some versions, a sawn-off ram's horn) and a red-hot poker were inserted into his anus, allegedly by Sir John Maltravers of Dorset. No contemporary account survives to this effect, which is probably a later interpolation.
James I	House of Stuart (Scotland)	c. 25 July 1394	1406–1437	21 February 1437 (aged 42)	A group of Scots led by Sir Robert Graham assassinated James at the Friars Preachers Monastery in Perth. He attempted to escape his assailants through a sewer but, three days earlier, he had had the other end of the drain blocked up because of its connection to the tennis court outside.
Henry VI	House of Lancaster (England)	6 December 1421	1422–1461; 1470–1471	21 May 1471 (aged 49)	Imprisoned and murdered in the Tower of London.
Jane	House of Tudor (England)	c. October 1537	1553	12 February 1554 (aged 16/17)	Executed (beheaded)
Mary I	House of Stuart (Scotland)	8 December 1542	1542–1567	8 February 1587 (aged 44)	Convicted of treason against the English Crown and beheaded at Fotheringay Castle, Northamptonshire.
Charles I	House of Stuart (Scotland)	19 November 1600	1625–1649	30 January 1649 (aged 48)	Found guilty of high treason by 59 commissioners after the Second English Civil War and beheaded.
George V	House of Saxe-Coburg-Gotha; House of Windsor	3 June 1865	1910–1936	20 January 1936 (aged 70)	Drug overdose (euthanasia lethal injection administered by his doctor)

=== Other ===
Name	House	Born	Reign	Death	Notes
Richard II	Angevins or Plantagenets (England)	6 January 1367	1377–1399	c. 14 February 1400 (aged 33)	Placed in Pontefract Castle, and probably murdered (or starved to death) there.
Edward V	House of York (England)	2 November 1470	1483	c. 1483 (aged 12)	Imprisoned in the Tower of London along with his younger brother Richard of Shrewsbury. The date and cause of death of both Princes in the Tower remain unknown.

== Accidental death ==
Name	House	Born	Reign	Death	Notes
William II, Rufus	The Normans (England)	c. 1056	1087–1100	2 August 1100 (aged ~44)	Killed by an arrow through the heart during a hunting trip. Widely suspected, though not proven, to be murder to benefit one of his brothers.
Alexander III	House of Dunkeld (Scotland)	4 September 1241	1249–1286	19 March 1286 (aged 44)	Fell from his horse in the dark while riding to visit the queen at Kinghorn in Fife. He had been separated from his guides and it is assumed that in the dark his horse lost its footing.
William III and II	House of Orange	4 November 1650	1689–1702	8 March 1702 (aged 51)	Died of pneumonia, a complication from a broken collarbone resulting from a fall off his horse. He was asthmatic.

== Unknown ==
Name	House	Born	Reign	Death	Notes
Eochaid		878–889		Obscure figures who disappear from historical records after 889.	
Giric		878–889		Obscure figures who disappear from historical records after 889.	
Edmund II Ironside	c. 988/993	1016	30 November 1016 (aged 25-26)	Died of wounds after losing the battle of Ashingdon (18 October 1016) though some later sources hint at assassination	
Donald III “Donalbain”	House of Dunkeld (Scotland)	before 1040	1093–1094; 1094–1097	1097 or after (aged 66–67)	William of Malmesbury states that he was "slain by the craftiness of David ... and by the strength of William [Rufus]". The Anglo-Saxon Chronicle says of Domnall that he was expelled, while the Annals of Tigernach have him blinded by his brother, for which we should read nephew. John of Fordun, following the king-lists, writes that Domnall was "blinded, and doomed to eternal imprisonment" by Edgar, omitting that the place of his imprisonment was said to be Rescobie, by Forfar, in Angus.
