= Boite mac Cináeda =

11th-century Scottish prince

- Died: 1058
- Issue: Gruoch, Queen of Scotland
- House: Alpin
- Father: Kenneth II or Kenneth III of Scotland

Boite mac Cináeda ("Boite son of Kenneth"; also, Bodhe, Boedhe, etc.; d. 1058) was a member of the Scottish royal kindred active in the late 10th and early 11th centuries. His patronymic identifies him as the son of a Cináed (Kenneth), though modern historians debate whether this refers to Kenneth II of Scotland (Cináed mac Maíl Coluim) or Kenneth III of Scotland (Cináed mac Duib).

Boite is identified in later genealogical material as the father of Gruoch, who became queen consort following her husband Macbeth's seizure of the Scottish throne in 1040. Through Gruoch, Boite appears to have belonged to a branch of the royal dynasty descended from Cináed mac Maíl Coluim (Kenneth II), and this connection may have strengthened Macbeth’s dynastic position in the contested succession politics of early eleventh-century Alba.

Little contemporary evidence survives concerning Boite’s life. Assertions that he played a direct political role in arranging Gruoch’s marriage to Macbeth or in the accession of his grandson Lulach are not supported by surviving annalistic sources and derive primarily from later historical reconstruction. Modern scholarship treats him as a royal kinsman whose historical significance lies chiefly in his genealogical connection to the ruling house.

== Parentage ==
Boite’s patronymic identifies him as the son of a Cináed (Kenneth), but contemporary sources do not specify whether this refers to Kenneth II (d. 995) or Kenneth III (d. 1005). Later genealogical material associates him with the royal house, though the precise line of descent remains uncertain. Modern historians have tended to identify him as a son of Kenneth II, as this reconstruction better explains Gruoch's dynastic position and Lulach's subsequent accession to the Scottish throne. However, alternative identifications linking him to Kenneth III have also been proposed, and the surviving evidence does not permit definitive resolution. The scarcity of contemporary documentation for early eleventh-century Scottish genealogy complicates efforts to establish firm lines of descent.

== Dynastic significance ==
Boite’s historical importance derives primarily from his position within the Scottish royal kindred and from his daughter Gruoch’s marriage to Macbeth. In the competitive succession politics of early eleventh-century Alba, claims to kingship were strengthened by descent from earlier rulers. Through Gruoch, Boite appears to have been connected to the line of Cináed mac Maíl Coluim (Kenneth II), a relationship that may have granted legitimacy to Macbeth's regime. After Macbeth’s death in 1057, the throne briefly passed to Gruoch’s son, Lulach. While the circumstances of Lulach’s accession remain obscure, his recognition as king suggests that his maternal royal ancestry was politically significant.

== In popular culture ==
A fictional version of Boite appeared in the animated television series Gargoyles.
