= Dunsinane (play) =

2010 play by David Greig

Flyer for the National Theatre of Scotland / Royal Shakespeare Company production of Dunsinane at the Lyceum Theatre, Edinburgh, 13 May to 4 June 2011

Dunsinane is a 2010 play by David Greig. It premiered in a Royal Shakespeare Company production at the Hampstead Theatre from 10 February to 6 March 2010, directed by RSC Associate Director Roxana Silbert and with leads including Siobhan Redmond and Jonny Phillips.

== Plot ==
The narrative is formed by the events following the defeat of Macbeth by Malcolm and an English army in the Battle of Dunsinane at the end of William Shakespeare’s play Macbeth. In Greig's version, Lady Macbeth is known as Gruach. Having outlived her second husband Macbeth, after she had Macbeth kill her first husband, Gruach continued to enforce the Moray claim to the throne via herself and her son by her first marriage. The playwright parallels the attempted nation-building by the English leader Siward and the continued bloodshed against the English occupying forces with contemporary events in Afghanistan and Iraq. He also includes the Shakespearean characters MacDuff and Malcolm, as well as introducing new characters such as Siward’s English subordinate Lord Egham and a chorus of English soldiers.

== Adaptation ==
A radio adaptation premiered on BBC Radio 3 directed by Roxana Silbert and with original songs and music composed by Nick Powell on 30 January 2011. The cast included:

Role	Actor
Siward	Jonny Phillips
Gruach	Siobhan Redmond
The Boy Soldier	Jack Farthing
Malcolm	Brian Ferguson / Sandy Greirson
MacDuff	Ewan Stewart
Egham	Alex Mann
Edward	Daniel Rose
George	Arthur McBain
Eric	Joshua Jenkins
Osborn (Siwards Son)	Jay Sentrosi
Lulach	Hauk Pattison / Daniel Campbell / Leo Garrick
Hen Girl	Lisa Hogg

== Tour ==
The National Theatre of Scotland has toured the Royal Shakespeare Company production since 2011 to theatres in Scotland, England, China the main land, China Hong Kong, China Taiwan, Russia and the United States. In Scotland, the play was staged at the Lyceum Theatre, Edinburgh from 13th May to 4th June and at the Citizens Theatre, Glasgow from 7th June to 11th June 2011.

== Notes and references ==
=== Sources ===
- Billington, Michael (17 February 2010). "Dunsinane". The Guardian.
- "Drama on 3, Dunsinane". BBC Radio 3. 2011.
- "National Theatre shows win oversees tour funding". The Scotsman. 2014.
