= Gruoch =

Queen of Scotland from 1040 to 1057

- A engraving depicting of Gruoch seeking help from Macbeth, created c. 19th century

Queen consort of Alba
- Tenure: 14 August 1040 – 15 August 1057
- Born: c. 1015 (presumed)
- Died: c. 1060 (presumed)
- Spouse: Gille Coemgáin, Mormaer of Moray (died 1032) Macbeth, King of Scots (m. 1032; died 1057)
- Issue: Lulach, King of Scots
- House: Alpin
- Father: Boite mac Cináeda

Gruoch ingen Boite (fl. c. 1015 – unknown) was a Scottish queen, the daughter of Boite mac Cináeda, son of Cináed II. The dates of her life are uncertain. She is most famous for being the wife and queen of MacBethad mac Findlaích (Macbeth), as well as the basis for Lady Macbeth in Shakespeare's Macbeth. However, Shakespeare's Macbeth is based on Holinshed's Chronicles (published in 1577) and is not historically accurate.

== Early life ==
Gruoch is believed to have been born in 1015 or before, the daughter of Boite mac Cináeda; her mother's name is not known. On her father's side, she was the granddaughter of either Kenneth II or Kenneth III and through this, may have had a claim to the Scottish throne herself.

== Marriages ==
Before 1032, Gruoch was married to Gille Coemgáin mac Maíl Brigti, the Mormaer (Earl) of Moray, with whom she had at least one son, Lulach mac Gille Coemgáin, later King of Scots. Gille Coemgáin was killed in 1032, burned to death in a hall with 50 of his men.

After the death of Gille Coemgáin, Gruoch married her husband's cousin, Macbeth. Macbeth may have been responsible for Gille Coemgáin's death, and certainly benefited from it, becoming Mormaer of Moray himself. Macbeth was the son of Findláech of Moray, a previous Mormaer who had been killed by Gille Coemgáin. It is unclear if Macbeth married Gruoch as an ally succoring the widow of a kinsman, or as a conqueror claiming the widow of an enemy. Macbeth may have had a claim to the Scottish throne himself, presumably by being the maternal grandson of Malcolm II, and may have married Gruoch to retain power over Moray as well as increase his own claim to the Scottish throne using his marriage to a potential claimant to the same throne. The next year, one of her male relatives, probably her only brother, was murdered by Malcolm II. Gruoch and Macbeth did not have any children; however, Macbeth did accept her son, Lulach, as his heir. Lulach is sometimes mistakenly identified as Macbeth's son, when in fact he was his step-son.

== Queen of Alba and later life ==
Macbeth killed King Duncan I in 1040 and succeeded him to become King of Alba with Gruoch becoming his queen. In grants made to the church of St Serf they are identified as "Machbet filius Finlach...et Gruoch filia Bodhe, rex et regina Scottorum", king and queen of Scots. In 1050, Marianus Scotus tells how the king made a pilgrimage to Rome in 1050, where, Marianus says, he gave money to the poor as if it were seed. It is unknown if Gruoch accompanied him to Rome.

Macbeth died on 15 August 1057, and Lulach succeeded him to become king of Scots; however, he was killed seven months later by Malcolm Canmore who became the next king of Scots. It is not known what became of Gruoch or even if she survived Macbeth. Her date of death is not known. Fictional accounts tell of her death by suicide the same year Macbeth died; however, there are no valid sources supporting this.

Gruoch is named with Boite and also with MacBethad in charters endowing the Culdee monastery at Loch Leven.

== In fiction ==
- Gruoch is the model for the character Lady Macbeth in William Shakespeare's play Macbeth.
- She is the heroine of Gordon Bottomley's 1921 verse drama Gruach, in which the King's Envoy (i.e. Macbeth) sees her sleepwalking on the eve of her marriage to another man, falls in love with her and carries her off. The play mentions her claim to the throne.
- She appears, named Groa, as a major character in Dorothy Dunnett's 1982 novel of Macbeth, King Hereafter, which topped The New York Times Best Seller list.
- Gruoch appeared in Nigel Tranter's MacBeth the King as Macbeth's co-ruler and a major character.
- Gruoch appears in the 1990s TV series Gargoyles. She is seen in flashbacks pertaining to Macbeth, who is a recurring antagonist in the series. This version of Gruoch is based on the historical figure and bears little resemblance to the literary Lady Macbeth.
- Susan Fraser King wrote Lady Macbeth, a 2008 historical novel about Gruoch, whose name she spelt as Gruadh. King asserts that the book is as deeply rooted in fact as possible. Gruadh also appeared in another Susan Fraser King novel, Queen Hereafter, about Margaret of Wessex and a fictional illegitimate daughter of King Lulach.
- Gruoch also appears as the wife of Macbeth, King of Scotland, and the mother of Lulach in Jackie French's children's novel Macbeth and Son, published in 2006.
- Gloria Carreño's 2009 play A Season Before the Tragedy of Macbeth premiered by British Touring Shakespeare 2010, also sheds new light on Gruach Macduff, the central character. The play considers events up to the opening of the letter from the three witches in Shakespeare's tragedy.
- In David Greig's 2010 play Dunsinane, she is known as Gruach and outlives Macbeth.
- The Celtic Blood series (2014–18) by Melanie Karsak is based on Gruoch's life from her birth until the end of her reign. This series combines elements of Shakespeare's MacBeth as well as the elements of the historical Gruoch in a druidic setting. The series consists of four books, all with Gruoch as the main character—Highland Raven, Highland Blood, Highland Vengeance and Highland Queen.
- Gruoch/Groa appears in the 2023 novel Queen Hereafter by Isabelle Schuler.
- In Gruoch and Macbeth: A Screenplay, a 2024 adaptation by Graham J. Howard, the character usually called Lady Macbeth is called Gruoch. Her son Lulach is also presented.
- Gruoch is the central character in Val McDermid's 2024 book, Queen Macbeth.

== Notes ==
Scottish royalty
Preceded by Suthen	Queen consort of Alba; 1040–1057	Succeeded by Ingibiorg Finnsdottir
