= Dunsinane Hill =

Hill in Perth and Kinross, Scotland

Coordinates: 56.4704°N 3.2780°W

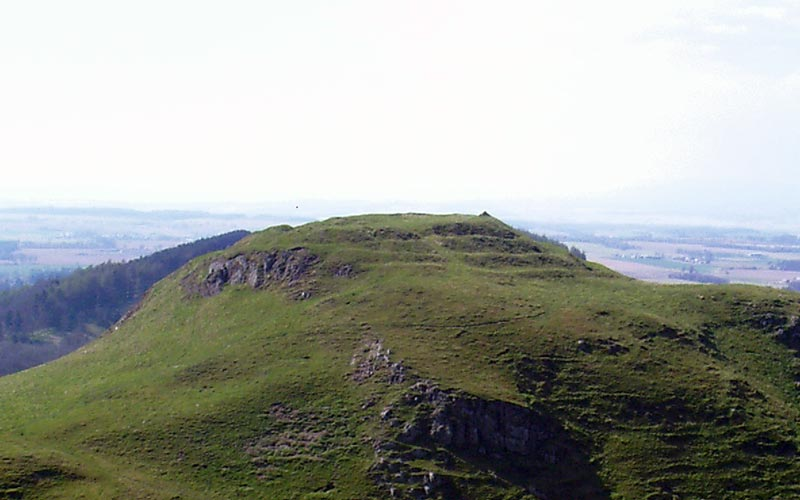
- Dunsinane Hill from Black Hill.

Highest point
- Elevation: 310 m (1,020 ft)
- Prominence: c. 53 m
- Listing: none

Geography
- Location within Scotland
- Location: Perth & Kinross, Scotland
- Parent range: Sidlaws
- OS grid: NO213316
- Topo map: OS Landranger 53

Dunsinane Hill (/dʌnˈsɪnən/ dun-SIN-ən) is a hill of the Sidlaws near the village of Collace in Perthshire, Scotland. It is mentioned in Shakespeare's play Macbeth, in which a vision informs Macbeth that he "shall never vanquished be, until Great Birnam wood to high Dunsinane hill Shall come against him." It is also where the Battle of Dunsinane, a real battle also featured in Macbeth, occurred.

The hill has a height of 310 metres (1,020 ft) and commands expansive views of the surrounding countryside. It is the site of a late Iron Age hill fort, the ramparts of which remain obvious. The site was damaged by undocumented amateur excavations in the 19th century by antiquarians attracted to the site by its Shakespearean connection. Little of value was learned about the history of the monument from these unscientific endeavours.

Dunsinane is the traditional site of a 1054 battle in which Siward, Earl of Northumbria, defeated Macbeth of Scotland. The much earlier Iron Age hill fort has long been known as Macbeth's Castle, though there is no archaeological evidence that it was in use by him or anyone during the mid eleventh century.

== Pronunciation and etymology ==
To facilitate the rhyme in the couplet "I will not be afraid of death and bane, Till Birnam forest come to Dunsinane" the pronunciation usually employed for Shakespeare's play has the accent on the first or third syllable, with a long "a" (i.e. /ˈdʌnsɪneɪn/ or /ˌdʌnsɪˈneɪn/). However, the correct pronunciation has the accent on the second syllable, with a short "a".

An alternative spelling of the name is Dunsinnan. The derivation is Gaelic, "the hill of ants"; possibly a reference to the large number of people it took to build the fortress.

== Ascent ==
The best access to Dunsinane Hill is from the rear of the Perthshire village of Collace on the northern side of Dunsinane Hill, between the village and the quarry. There is a small parking area there suitable for 4 or 5 cars, from which a steep, but clearly defined path leads directly to the summit.

== In popular culture ==
Dunsinane Hill is the title of the third track on the 2025 Jethro Tull album Curious Ruminant. The song's lyrics allude to the Macbeth quote, but the overall theme is "ruthless ambition and betrayal of erstwhile brothers in arms".

== Gallery ==
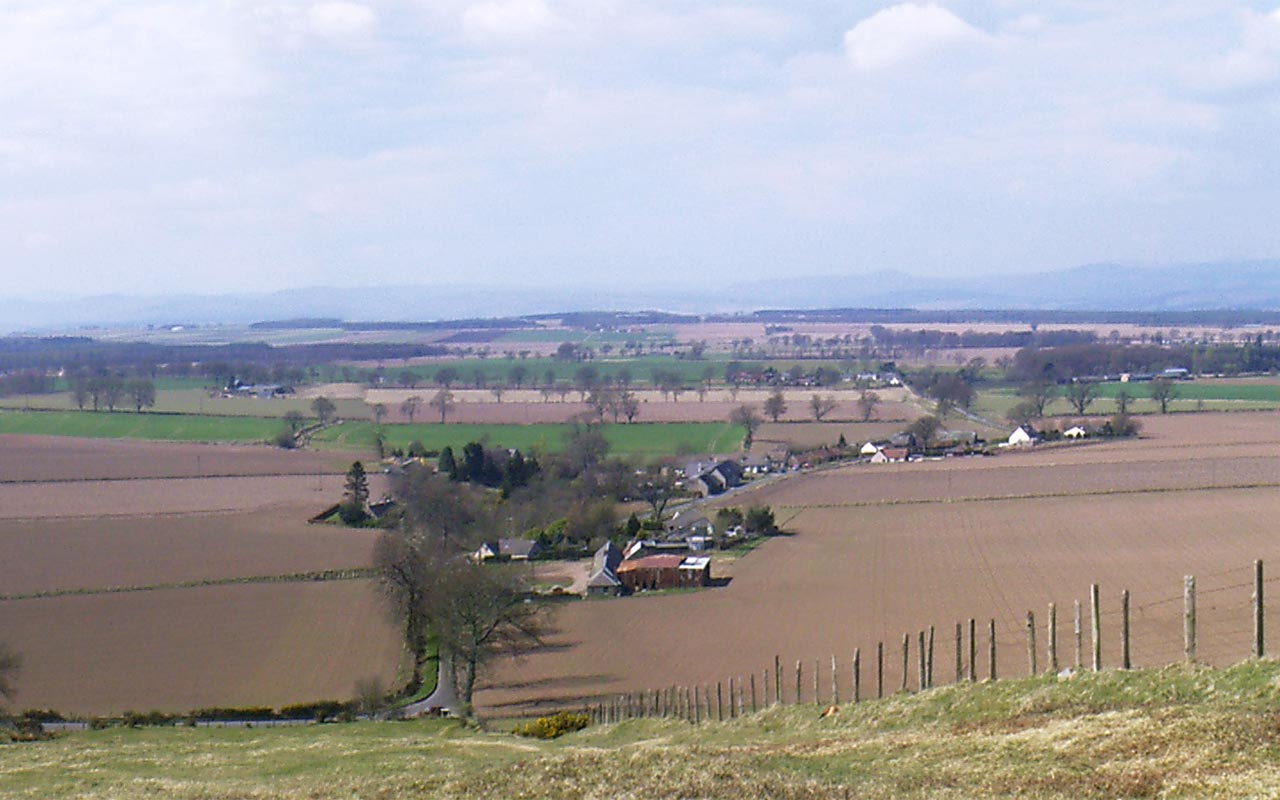
The village of Collace from Dunsinane Hill
