= Constantine of Scotland =

Constantine of Scotland may refer to:

- Constantine I of Scotland (died 877), king of Scotland
- Constantine II of Scotland (died 952), king of Scotland
- Constantine III of Scotland (died 997), king of Scotland
