= Bethóc =

11th-century Scottish princess

- Spouse: Crínán, Abbot of Dunkeld
- Issue: Duncan I of Scotland; Maldred of Allerdale; Unnamed daughter
- House: Alpin
- Father: Malcolm II of Scotland

Bethóc ingen Maíl Coluim (also Beatrice) was the elder daughter of Máel Coluim mac Cináeda, King of Scots, and the mother of his successor, Duncan I.

== Biography ==
Bethóc was the eldest daughter and heir of Malcolm II of Scotland, who had no known sons. She married Crínán, Abbot of Dunkeld, about 1000. This marriage may have been designed to encourage the Dunkeld's clan to remain loyal to Malcolm II.

Together, Bethóc and Crínán had an heir, Donnchad I. Crínán has also been assigned other children that may have been by Bethóc: Maldred, Lord of Allerdale, married Ealdgyth, daughter of Uhtred the Bold, and ancestor of the Earls of Dunbar; and a daughter (name not known), mother of Moddan, Earl of Caithness. Their heir Duncan, also known as Donnchad, succeeded his grandfather Malcolm II to become King of Alba in 1034.

Bethóc may have had two younger sisters: the woman (named by Hector Boece as Donada) who married Findláech mac Ruaidrí, Mormaer of Moray, and was the mother of Macbeth; and an unnamed woman who according to Orkneyinga saga married Sigurd Hlodvirsson, Earl of Orkney and was the mother of Thorfinn the Mighty. Early writers have asserted that Máel Coluim also designated Donnchad as his successor under the rules of tanistry because there were other possible claimants to the throne.

== Sources ==
- Anderson, Marjorie Ogilvy. Kings and Kingship in Early Scotland, 1973
