= Máel Coluim of Moray =

Scottish king

Máel Coluim mac Máil Brigti was King or Mormaer of Moray (1020–1029), and, as his name suggests, the son of a Máel Brigte (a different person from Máel Brigte the Bucktooth, who died in 892). As with his predecessor Findláech mac Ruaidrí, sources call him "King of Scotland."

Rather confusingly for some of our sources and for some historians, Máel Coluim held the kingship contemporaneously with another Máel Coluim, Máel Coluim II (mac Cináeda) of Scotland. The Orkneyinga Saga for instance tells us that Thorfinn Sigurdsson, Earl of Orkney was the son of the daughter of Máel Coluim, king of Scotland. Some historians have argued that this was Máel Coluim mac Cináeda of Scotland, but Hudson has suggested that Máel Coluim mac Máil Brigti is the more likely candidate (p. 135).

His death date derives from the Annals of Tigernach, which notes s.a. 1029, "Mael Colaim mac Mael-Brighdi mac Ruaidrí, rí Alban mortuus est (="Máel Coluim, son of Máel Brigte, son of Ruadrí, King of Scotland, dies")." As can be seen, if it were not for the mac Mael-Brighdi, we could easily assume we were being given an inaccurate date for the death of King Máel Coluim II.

Máel Coluim mac Máil Brigti seems to have been succeeded by his brother Gille Coemgáin.

Domnall mac Máil Coluim, "son of the King of Scotland", whose death is reported by the Annals of Ulster s.a. 1085, may have been a son of this Máel Coluim, or perhaps of Máel Coluim mac Donnchada (Malcolm III).

== Bibliography ==
- Anderson, Alan Orr, Early Sources of Scottish History: AD 500-1286, 2 Vols, (Edinburgh, 1922)
- Hudson, Benjamin T., Kings of Celtic Scotland, (Westport, 1994)

| Preceded by Findláech mac Ruaidrí | Mormaer of Moray; 1020–1029 | Succeeded by Gille Coemgáin mac Máil Brigti |
