= Máel Muire, Earl of Atholl =

Scottish noble

Máel Muire of Atholl was Mormaer of Atholl at the beginning of the 12th century, until sometime perhaps in the 1130s. According to the Orkneyinga Saga, Máel Muire was a son of king Donnchad I and a younger brother of King Máel Coluim III. A Malmori d' Athótla is mentioned in a charter relating to a year after 1130, contained within the Book of Deer.

== Bibliography ==
- Anderson, Alan Orr, Early Sources of Scottish History: AD 500-1286, 2 Vols, (Edinburgh, 1922
- Roberts, John L., Lost Kingdoms: Celtic Scotland in the Middle Ages, (Edinburgh, 1997

Preceded by ?Crínán	Mormaer of Atholl -1130s	Succeeded by Matad
