= Gille Coemgáin of Moray =

Mormaer of Moray

Gille Coemgáin

Mormaer of Moray
- Reign: 1029–1032
- Predecessor: Máel Coluim of Moray
- Successor: Macbeth
- Spouse: Gruoch
- Issue: Lulach, King of Scotland

Gille Coemgáin mac Máil Brigti (died 1032) was the King or Mormaer of Moray, a semi-autonomous kingdom centred on Inverness that stretched across the north of Scotland. Unlike his two predecessors, he is not called King of Scotland in his death notice, but merely Mormaer. This has led to some speculation that he was never actually the ruler of Moray, but merely a subordinate of MacBethad mac Findláich. (Hudson p. 136).

In 1020, he participated in the killing of his uncle Findláech, the father of MacBeth. He became the Mormaer of Moray in 1029, after the death of his brother. He married Gruoch, the granddaughter of Kenneth III, and they had a son, Lulach.

The Annals of Ulster (s.a. 1032) reports that Gille Coemgáin was burned to death, together with 50 of his men. The perpetrators are not mentioned in any sources. From circumstances, two candidates have been proposed for the murder: Malcolm II of Scotland or Mac Bethad, who then became the only ruler of Moray. Both had reason to want him dead.

Gille Coemgáin is believed to have killed his cousin Dúngal mac Cináeda, the younger brother of Malcolm II, in 999. Apart from that, Gille Coemgáin and his son Lulach might have been rivals for the kingdom, since Gille Coemgáin's wife Gruoch was a granddaughter of Kenneth III of Scotland, and may have been able to transmit her claim to the throne to her husband or her son. Malcolm had no living sons, and the threat to his plans for the succession was obvious. The next year, Gruoch's brother or nephew, who might have eventually become king, was also killed by Malcolm.

Gille Coemgáin had also participated in the death of MacBeth's father, and his death at MacBeth's hands may also have been an act of retaliation; however, this is not documented. Mac Bethad gained more from Gille Coemgáin's death for not only did he become the solitary ruler of Moray, he also married Gruoch, Gille Coemgáin's widow and accepted Lulach as his heir. The marriage may have been either as a conquered enemy widow or a widow of an ally and kinsman, depending on who was responsible for the murder. Both scenarios are entirely credible, knowing archaic medieval customs – nothing exculpatory can be concluded from the marriage, whereas the adoption of the stepson may be a weightier indication. Macbeth may also have had a claim to the Scottish throne himself, presumably by being the maternal grandson of Malcolm II, and may have married Gruoch to retain power over Moray as well as increase his own claim to the Scottish throne by marrying a potential claimant to the same throne.

== In fiction ==
In the animated series Gargoyles, Gille Coemgáin is referred to as Gillecomgain. As a boy, Gille Coemgáin surprises Demona prowling around one night in his family's barn, and is promptly slashed in the face by the female gargoyle, creating the generational line of "hunters" bent on destroying all gargoyles. As an adult, just as in medieval reality, Gille Coemgáin kills his uncle Findlaech of Moray, here under the orders of Duncan I of Scotland. Duncan rewards Gillecomgain by making him High Steward of Moray and marrying him to Gruoch.

== Bibliography ==
- Hudson, Benjamin T., Kings of Celtic Scotland, (Westport, 1994)

Preceded by Máel Coluim mac Máil Brigti	Mormaer of Moray; 1029–1032	Succeeded by Mac Bethad mac Findláich
