= Kenneth of Scotland =

Kenneth of Scotland may refer to:

- Kenneth I of Scotland, a.k.a. Kenneth MacAlpin, (died 858), king of the Picts and arguably the first king of the Scots
- Kenneth II of Scotland, nicknamed "The Fratricide", (before 954–995), King of Scotland
- Kenneth III of Scotland, nicknamed "the Chief" or "the Brown", (before 967–1005)
