= Battle of Dunsinane =

Battle in Scotland in 1054

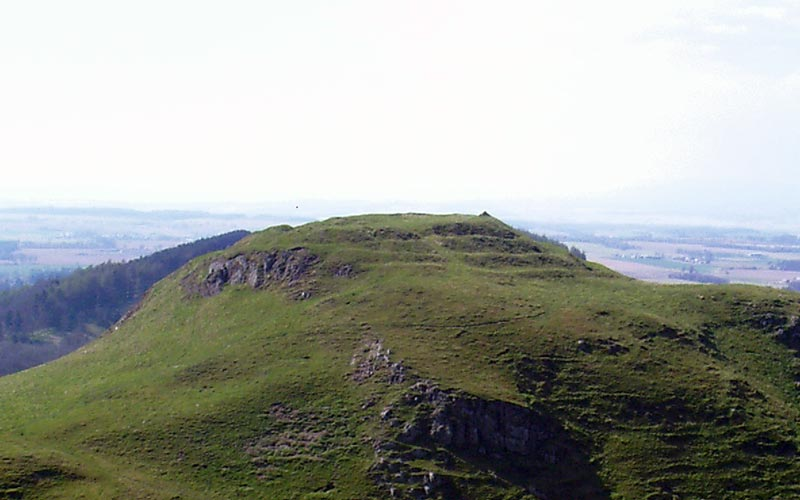
- Dunsinane Hill from Black Hill
Date	27 July 1054
Location	Dunsinane Hill 56°28′13″N 3°16′40″W
Result	English victory

Belligerents
Kingdom of Scotland	Kingdom of England

Commanders and leaders
Macbeth, King of Scotland	Siward, Earl of Northumbria; Malcolm Canmore

Casualties and losses
~3,000	~1,500
- Casualty numbers from the Annals of Ulster
- Location of Dunsinane Hill within Perth and Kinross.

The Battle of Dunsinane, also known as the Battle of the Seven Sleepers, was fought between the forces of Macbeth, King of Scotland and forces led by Siward, Earl of Northumbria and Malcolm Canmore on 27 July 1054. The battle was part of a campaign launched by Siward in support of Malcolm's claim to the Scottish throne, which Macbeth had gained after killing Malcolm's father, Duncan I of Scotland, at the Battle of Pitgaveny in 1040. Ending in victory for Siward and Malcolm, the battle was fought in Perthshire, traditionally on Dunsinane Hill.

Following their victory Siward returned home, leaving Malcolm in control of lands from where he was able to further challenge Macbeth. Macbeth would later be killed during the battle of Lumphanan in 1057 while fighting against Malcolm. While Macbeth's stepson Lulach was initially made king, he would also fall in battle against Malcolm and in 1058 Malcolm was crowned Malcolm III of Scotland.

== Background ==
As the ruler of Moray, Macbeth came into conflict with Duncan I of Scotland. This resulted in Duncan's death on 14 August 1040 in the battle of Pitgaveny, near Elgin, after which Macbeth became King of Scotland. Following the death of Duncan, his son Malcolm Canmore became an exile living with the court of Edward the Confessor, King of England.

In 1054 Malcolm was present when his uncle, Siward, Earl of Northumbria, invaded Scotland on his behalf. Some sources state this was on the orders of Edward the Confessor, in which case it is possible that Edward sought a puppet king in Scotland to strengthen his hand against Norman and Scandinavian factions who challenged his succession. An alternative scenario is that Siward hoped a friendly king in Scotland would aid his claim to the rule of Cumbria and took the chance to act while Edward was busy in the south.

The 14th-century historian John of Fordun writes that the invasion caused confusion among the locals who were unsure who to support, suggesting that there may have been Scots loyal to Malcolm fighting alongside the English under Siward. On Macbeth's side were some Norman allies, including two knights who had been expelled from England in 1052 and had been taken into service by Macbeth.

== Battle ==
The decisive battle of Siward's campaign was fought in Perthshire, north of the river Tay, traditionally on Dunsinane Hill although this connection is based on literary as much as historical tradition. The battle is also known as the battle of the Seven Sleepers, as it was fought on the day of the Seven Sleepers (27 July).

The battle ended in defeat for Macbeth. According to the Annals of Ulster 3,000 Scots and 1,500 English were killed. Siward's son Osbeorn and his nephew, also called Siward, were both killed in the battle.

== Aftermath ==
According to the 12th-century chronicler Henry of Huntingdon, Siward ravaged the kingdom after his victory over the Scots and their Norman allies. The earl returned home relatively quickly with much plunder, weakening the invading force. Siward would die in York in 1055.

After his defeat Macbeth was forced to give lands and position to Malcolm. The exact positions are unknown but it is probable that Macbeth still controlled the area north of the Mounth while Malcolm controlled the area south of the rivers Forth and Clyde, with the area in between possibly disputed territory. From this position Malcolm was able to challenge Macbeth, with Macbeth being defeated and killed at Lumphanan in Mar on 15 August 1057. Following Macbeth's death his stepson Lulach was installed as king. Malcolm ambushed and killed Lulach near Rhynie in Strathbogie in March 1058 before himself being crowned king. Once king, he would begin the long process of removing the Gaelic culture from the mainstream of Scotland.

== In popular culture ==
William Shakespeare's play The Tragedy of Macbeth is based on the life of Macbeth, King of Scots, with the historical details being drawn from Ralph Holinshed's Chronicles, published in 1577. In this version Malcolm has his forces cut branches from the trees of Birnam Wood which are then used to camouflage their approach to Dunsinane, fulfilling a prophecy made within the play that Macbeth would not be defeated until Birnam Wood came to Dunsinane. In Shakespeare's telling Macbeth is killed by Macduff during the battle of Dunsinane, running together several encounters in different places, including the battle of Lumphanan. Historic Environment Scotland have highlighted that the connection between Dunsinane Hill and Macbeth in literary tradition has given the site a place in the national consciousness of Scotland.

== Sources ==
- Adam, R. J. (June 1957). "The Real Macbeth: King of Scots, 1040–1054". History Today. 7 (6): 381–387.
- Aird, William M. (2004). "Siward, Earl of Northumbria". Oxford Dictionary of National Biography (online ed.). Oxford University Press. doi:10.1093/ref:odnb/25652. (Subscription, Wikipedia Library access or UK public library membership required.)
- Archibald, Malcolm (2016). Dance If Ye Can: A Dictionary of Scottish Battles. Creativia. ISBN 978-1536821796.
- Barrow, G. W. S. (2008). "Malcolm III [Mael Coluim Ceann Mór, Malcolm Canmore]". Oxford Dictionary of National Biography (online ed.). Oxford University Press. doi:10.1093/ref:odnb/17859. (Subscription, Wikipedia Library access or UK public library membership required.)
- Broun, Dauvit (2004). "Macbeth [Mac Bethad mac Findlaích]". Oxford Dictionary of National Biography (online ed.). Oxford University Press. doi:10.1093/ref:odnb/17356. (Subscription, Wikipedia Library access or UK public library membership required.)
- Cannon, J. A. (2015). "Lumphanan, Battle of". In Crowcroft, Robert; Cannon, John (eds.). The Oxford Companion to British History. Oxford University Press. ISBN 978-0-19-967783-2.
- Crofton, Ian (2012). A Dictionary of Scottish Phrase and Fable. Birlinn. ISBN 978-0-85790-637-3.
- Green, Jonathan (2010). Scottish Miscellany : Everything You Always Wanted to Know About Scotland the Brave. New York: Skyhorse Publishing, Inc. ISBN 9781628732207.
- Historic Environment Scotland. "Dunsinane Hill, fort". Historic Environment Scotland.
- Taylor, Cameron (2015). On The Trail of the Real Macbeth: King of Alba. Luath Press Ltd. ISBN 978-1-910324-61-5.
