= Malcolm II of Scotland =

King of Alba from 1005 to 1034

Malcolm II

King of Alba (Scotland)
- Reign: c. 25 March 1005– 25 November 1034
- Predecessor: Kenneth III
- Successor: Duncan I
- Born: c. 954
- Died: 25 November 1034 (aged 79/80); Glamis Castle, Scotland
- Burial: Iona
- Issue: Bethóc; Donada; Olith, wife of Sigurd the Stout (possible)
- House: Alpin
- Father: Kenneth II of Scotland

Máel Coluim mac Cinaeda (Modern Scottish Gaelic: Maol Chaluim mac Choinnich; anglicised Malcolm II; (c.958 – 25 November 1034) was King of Alba (Scotland) from 1005 until his death in 1034. He was one of the longest-reigning Scottish Kings of that period.

He was a son of Cinaed mac Maíl Choluim or King Kenneth II, and The Prophecy of Berchán (which referred to him as Forranach, "the Destroyer") says his mother was "a woman of Leinster". His mother may have been a daughter of a Uí Dúnlainge King of Leinster.

To the Irish annals, which recorded his death, Malcolm was ard rí Alban, High King of Scotland, but his fellow Kings of the geographical area of modern Scotland included the King of Strathclyde, who ruled much of the south-west, various Norse–Gaels Kings on the western coast and the Hebrides and his nearest and most dangerous rivals, the kings or "mormaers" of Moray.

Since he did not have any surviving sons, Malcolm pursued a strategy of marrying his daughters into these regional dynasties, which helped create stability in his reign, and ensured that he became the grandfather of his successor Duncan I of Scotland, through his daughter Bethóc, and according to some sources, of Macbeth, King of Scotland, (about whom William Shakespeare later wrote the play Macbeth), through his daughter Donada. Later Scandinavian saga tradition claims that the mother of Earl Thorfinn the Mighty was a daughter of Malcolm, though the Malcolm in question may have been Máel Coluim of Moray.

== Early years and path to the throne ==
Malcolm II was the son of Kenneth II and grandson of Malcolm I. Fourteenth century Scottish chronicler John of Fordun writes that Malcolm defeated a Norwegian army "in almost the first days after his coronation", but this is not reported elsewhere. Fordun says that the Bishopric of Mortlach (later moved to Aberdeen) was founded in thanks for this victory over the Norwegians.

Succession of Scottish kings at the time often involved murder, even patricide. The killer of Scottish King Constantine III in 997 is credited as being "Kenneth, son of Malcolm". Since Kenneth II died in 995, this is considered an error, for either Kenneth III, (grandson of Malcolm I), who succeeded Constantine and stood to benefit, but by John of Fordham, for Malcolm II himself.

Whether Malcolm killed Constantine or not, he certainly killed Constantine's successor Kenneth III in 1005, during a battle at Monzievaird in Strathearn.

== Raids into Bernicia ==
The first reliable report of Malcolm II's reign is an attack in 1006 of territory under the Northumbrian rulers of Bamburgh (the lands between the River Forth and the River Tees, roughly ancient Bernicia), perhaps the customary crech ríg (literally royal prey, a raid by a new King made to demonstrate prowess in war), which involved a siege of Durham. This resulted in a heavy defeat to the Northumbrians, led by Uhtred of Bamburgh, ruler of Bamburgh and ealdorman of Northumbria, which is reported by the Annals of Ulster.

A second war against the Northumbrian English, probably in 1018, was more successful. The Battle of Carham, by the River Tweed, was a victory for the Scots led by Malcolm II and the men of Strathclyde led by their king, Owain Foel (Owen the Bald). By this time Eiríkr Hákonarson had been appointed ealdorman in Northumbria by his brother-in-law Cnut the Great, with limited in practice to the south around York, the former kingdom of Deira.

The twelfth-century tract known as De obsessione Dunelmi (The siege of Durham, associated with Symeon of Durham) claims that Uhtred's brother Eadwulf Cudel surrendered Lothian to Malcolm II, possibly in the aftermath of the defeat at Carham. Some other lands between Dunbar and the Tweed as other parts of Lothian may have been under Scots control before this time.

== Relationships with neighbouring states ==
Malcolm demonstrated a rare ability to survive among early Scottish Kings by reigning for 29 years. Brehon tradition provided that the successor to Malcolm was to be selected by him from among the descendants of King Aedh (Áed mac Cináeda), King of the Picts, with the consent of Malcolm's ministers and of the Church. Perhaps in an attempt to end the devastating feuds in the north of Scotland, and influenced by the Norman model, Malcolm ignored tradition and was determined to retain succession within his own line. Since Malcolm had no son of his own, he negotiated a series of dynastic marriages of his daughters to men who might otherwise be his rivals, while securing the loyalty of their relatives, the principal chiefs. The throne passed to his grandson through his eldest daughter.

=== Dynastic marriages of his daughters ===
Although the identity of Malcolm's wives and queens are unknown, he did have at least one and probably three daughters. Malcolm married his eldest daughter Bethóc to Crínán of Dunkeld, head of what became the house of Atholl or Dunkeld dynasty and later Abbot of Dunkeld. Malcolm may have had another daughter, possibly named Donada, who married Finlay, ruler of Moray, father of Macbeth, later King of Scotland. Later Scandinavian saga tradition claims that the mother of Earl Thorfinn the Mighty was a daughter of Malcolm, though the Malcolm in question may have been Máel Coluim of Moray.

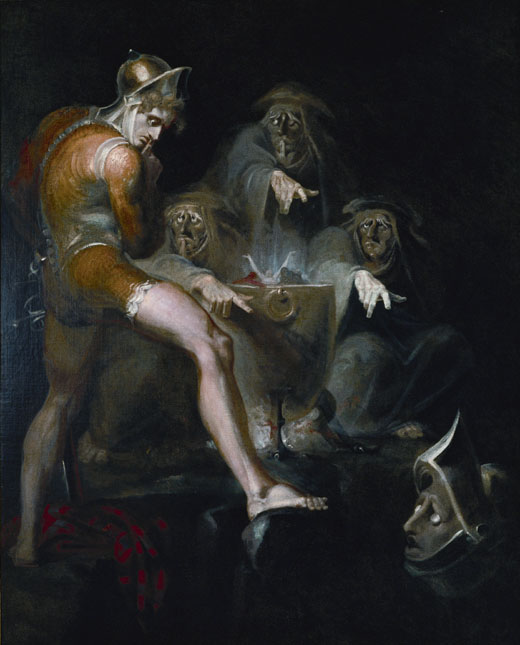
Macbeth consulting the Vision of the Armed Head by Johann Heinrich Füssli

==== Sources of the Macbeth connection ====
Fourteenth century Scottish chronicler and poet Andrew of Wyntoun suggests that "a third daughter" of Malcolm married Findláech of Moray, (Findláech mac Ruaidrí), father of Macbeth, King of Scotland, (Macbethad mac Findláech), which would make Malcolm to be Macbeth's grandfather.

The only other early reference to Malcolm as Macbeth's grandfather is Raphael Holinshed's 1577 Chronicle of Scotland, an inspiration to William Shakespeare, which names "Doada" as a daughter of Malcolm II King of Scotland, and adds that she married "Sinell the thane of Glammis, by whom she had issue one Makbeth".

Seventeenth century historian Frederic Van Bossen only lists two daughters, one whom he calls "Beatrice, who married Albanacht the son of Crinan", and the other as "Daboada, who was the mother of Macbeth, and the wife of Finell, the Thane of Angus and Glames and the son of Cruthneth".

=== Relationship with Cnut ===
The Anglo-Saxon Chronicle reports that Cnut The Great (Canute) led an army into Scotland on his return from a pilgrimage to Rome. The Chronicle dates this to 1031, but there are reasons to suppose that it should be dated to 1027. Contemporary Burgundian chronicler Rodulfus Glaber recounts the expedition soon afterward, describing Malcolm as "powerful in resources and arms ... very Christian in faith and deed." Rodulfus claims that peace was made between Malcolm and Cnut through the intervention of Richard, Duke of Normandy, brother of Cnut's wife Emma. Richard died circa 1027 and Rodulfus wrote close in time to the events.

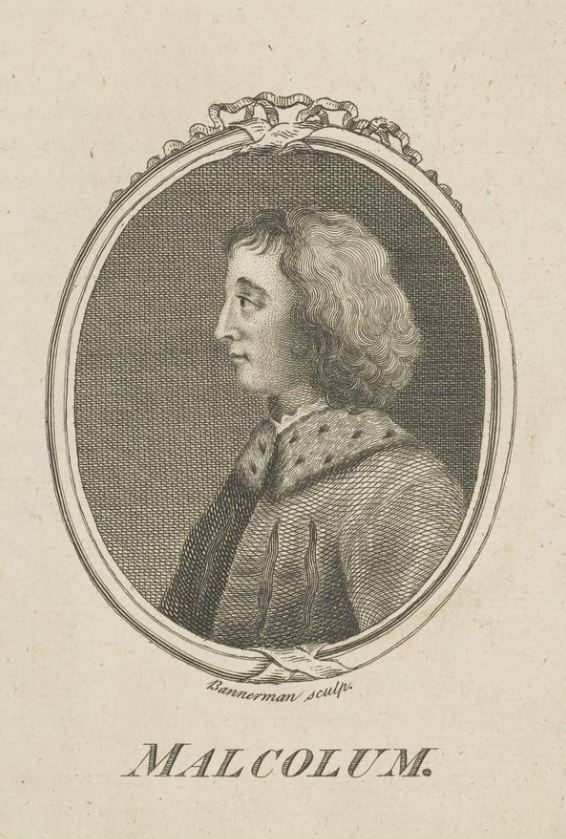
Malcolm II

Cnut came away only with a promise of peace and friendship, rather than the guarantee of aid on land and sea that previous kings such as Edgar and others had obtained. Contemporary sources say that Malcolm was accompanied by one or two other kings, certainly future King Mac Bethad, and perhaps Echmarcach mac Ragnaill, King of Mann and the Isles, and of Galloway. The Anglo-Saxon Chronicle remarks of the submission "but he [Malcolm] adhered to that for only a little while". Cnut was soon occupied in Norway against Olaf Haraldsson and appears to have had no further involvement with Scotland.

Modern historian Duncan speculates that the quarrel between Cnut and Malcolm may have had its roots in Cnut's pilgrimage to Rome, and the coronation of Holy Roman Emperor Conrad II, where Cnut and Rudolph III, King of Burgundy had the place of honour. If Malcolm were present, and the repeated mentions of his piety in the annals make it quite possible that he made a pilgrimage to Rome, then the coronation could have allowed Malcolm to publicly snub Cnut's claims to overlordship.

=== Relationship with Orkney and Moray ===
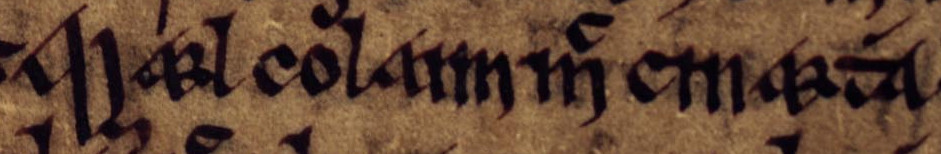
Mæl Colaim M^{c} Cinæta in the Annals of Ulster

Malcolm may also have married a daughter named Donada to Findláech of Moray (Findláech Mac Ruaidrí) and Macbeth, King of Scotland is presumed to be their son. Scandinavian saga tradition also claims that the mother of Earl Thorfinn the Mighty of Orkney was a daughter of Malcolm. However, as modern historian Duncan tells it, even if Malcolm exercised some control over Moray, the annals record several events pointing to a struggle for power in the north. Irish sources record that in 1020, Bethad mac Findláech's, (later known as Macbeth, King of Scotland), father Findláech mac Ruaidrí was killed by the sons of his brother Máel Brigte, and that Máel Coluim mac Máil Brigti (Máel Coluim of Moray) took control of Moray. His death is reported in 1029.

Despite the accounts of the Irish annals, English and Scandinavian writers describe Mac Bethad as the rightful king of Moray, during descriptions of his meeting with Cnut in 1027, before the death of Malcolm mac Máil Brigti. Malcolm mac Máil Brigti was followed as king or earl by his brother Gille Comgain (Gille Coemgáin of Moray). It has been supposed that Mac Bethad was responsible for the killing of Gille Coemgáin in 1032, but if Mac Bethad had a cause for feud in the killing of his father in 1020, Malcolm too had reason to see Gille Coemgáin dead. Not only had Gillecomgan's ancestors killed many of Malcolm's kin, but Gille Coemgáin and his son Lulach might have been rivals for the kingdom, since Gille Coemgáin's wife Gruoch was a granddaughter of King Kenneth III and could transmit her claim to the throne to her husband or her son. Malcolm had no living sons, and the threat to his plans for the succession was obvious. As a result, the following year Gruoch's brother or nephew, who might have eventually become king, was killed by Malcolm. Mac Bethad married Grouch after the death of Gillecomgain, presumably to retain power over Moray and maybe to increase his own claim to the Scottish throne.

=== Relationship with Strathclyde ===
It has traditionally been supposed that king Owen the Bald (Owain Foel) of Strathclyde died at the battle of Carham and that the kingdom passed into the hands of the Scots afterwards. This rests on some very weak evidence. It is far from certain that Owen died at Carham, and it is reasonably certain that there were kings of Strathclyde as late as 1054, when Edward the Confessor sent Earl Siward to install "Malcolm son of the king of the Cumbrians". The confusion is old, probably inspired by William of Malmesbury and embellished by John of Fordun, but there is no firm evidence that the kingdom of Strathclyde was a part of the kingdom of the Scots, rather than a loosely subjected kingdom, before the time of Malcolm II of Scotland's great-grandson Malcolm III.

== Succession ==
By the 1030s Malcolm's sons, if he had any, were dead. The only evidence that he did have a son or sons is in Rodulfus Glaber's chronicle where Cnut is said to have stood as godfather to "a son of Malcolm". His grandson Thorfinn would have been unlikely to be accepted as king by the Scots, and he chose the sons of his other daughter, Bethóc, who was married to Crínán, lay abbot of Dunkeld, and perhaps Mormaer of Atholl. It may be no more than coincidence, but in 1027 the Irish annals had reported the burning of Dunkeld, although no mention is made of the circumstances. Malcolm's chosen heir, and the first tánaise ríg certainly known in Scotland, was Duncan.

If Macbeth was Malcolm II's grandson, then when Macbeth's soldiers killed Duncan I, before Macbeth took the throne, Malcolm II would have had one grandson kill another to succeed the first as king.

== Death and posterity ==
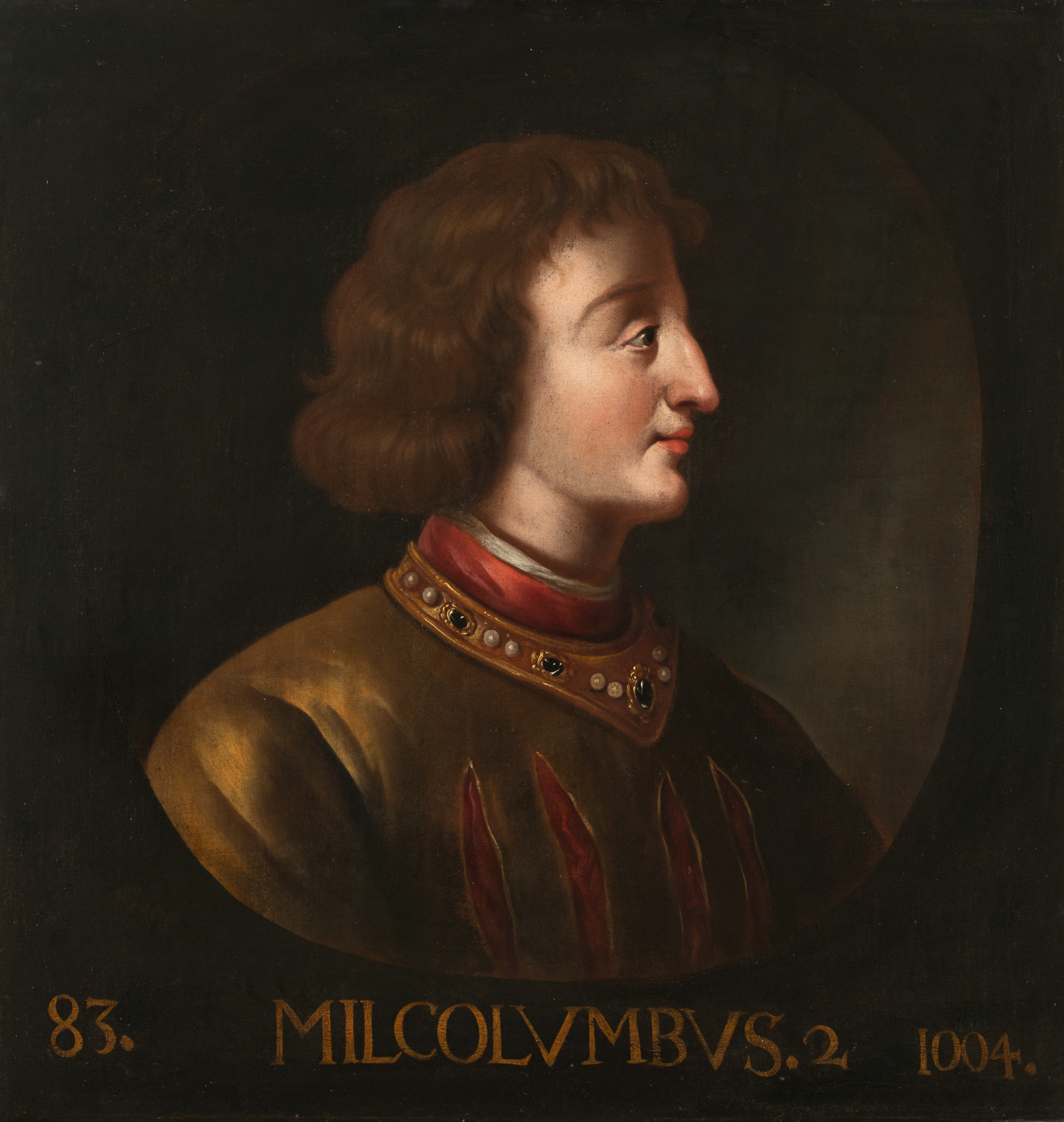
Painting by Jacob de Wet II

Marianus Scotus gives the date of Malcolm's death as 25 November 1034. The king lists say that he died at Glamis Castle, variously describing him as a "most glorious" or "most victorious" king. The Annals of Tigernach report, "Malcolm mac Cináeda, king of Scotland, the honour of all the west of Europe, died". The Prophecy of Berchán, perhaps the inspiration for John of Fordun and Andrew of Wyntoun's accounts where Malcolm is killed fighting bandits, says that he died by violence, fighting "the parricides".

Marianus tells us that Malcolm's grandson Duncan I became king and ruled for five years and nine months. Given that Duncan's subsequent death in 1040 is described as being "at an immature age" in the Annals of Tigernach, he must have been a very young man in 1034. Modern historian Duncan speculates that the absence of any effective opposition to Duncan's youthful kingship suggests that Malcolm had thoroughly dealt with any succession issues before he died.

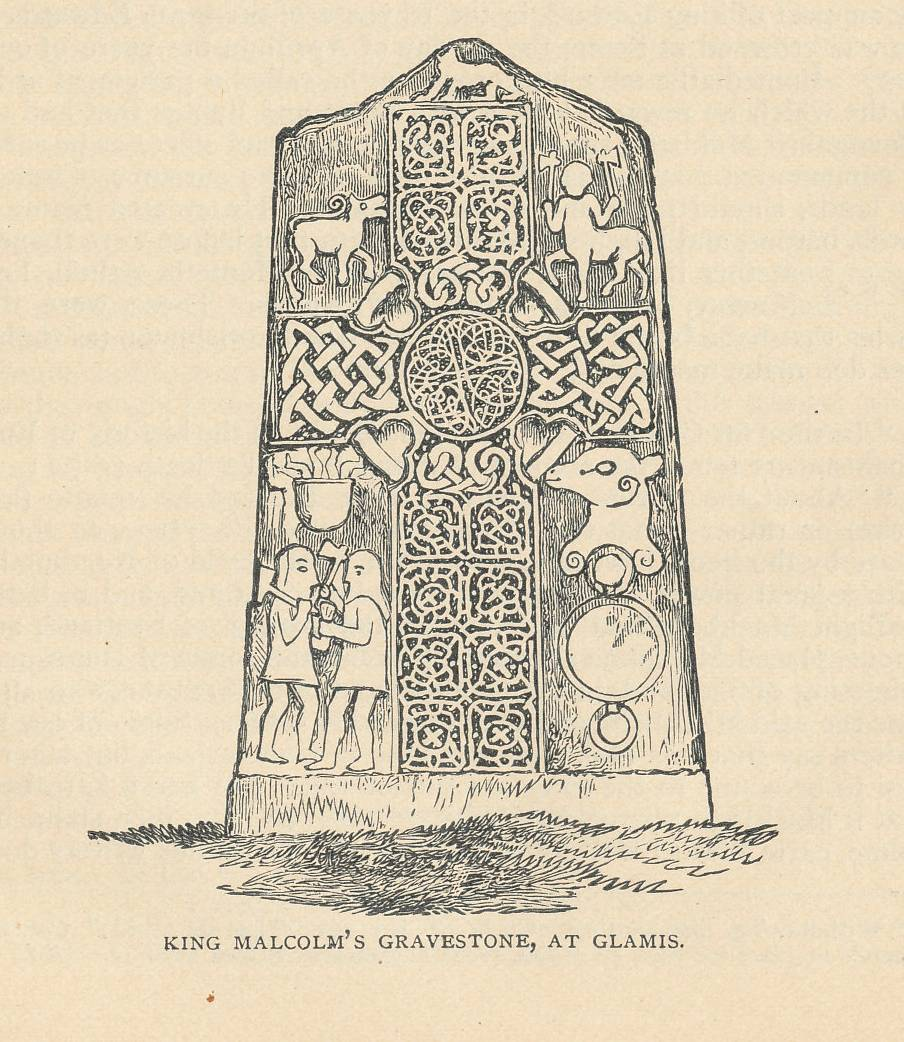
Nineteenth century engraving of "King Malcolm's grave stone" (Glamis no. 2) at Glamis Castle

Tradition, dating from Fordun's time if not earlier, knew the Pictish stone now called "Glamis 2" as "King Malcolm's grave stone". The stone is a Class II stone, apparently formed by re-using a Bronze Age standing stone. Its dating is uncertain, with dates from the 8th century onwards having been proposed. While an earlier date is favoured, an association with accounts of Malcolm's has been proposed on the basis of the iconography of the carvings.

Malcolm's putative pilgrimage to Rome, and other long-distance journeys, while not confirmed, were far from unusual. Thorfinn Sigurdsson, Cnut and Mac Bethad all travelled widely. Dyfnwal of Strathclyde died on a pilgrimage to Rome in 975 as did Máel Ruanaid uá Máele Doraid, king of the Cenél Conaill, in 1025.

Not a great deal is known of Malcolm's activities beyond the wars and killings. The Book of Deer records that Malcolm "gave a king's dues in Biffie and in Pett Meic-Gobraig, and two davochs" to the monastery of Old Deer. He was also probably not the founder of the Bishopric of Mortlach-Aberdeen.

Malcolm II of Scotland House of Alpin Born: c. 980 Died: 25 November 1034
Regnal titles
Preceded by Kenneth III	King of Alba; 1005–1034	Succeeded by Duncan I
