= Findláech of Moray =

King of Moray

Findláech mac Ruaidrí (died 1020), son of Ruaidrí mac Donald, was the minor "king", locally called "Mormaer", of Moray, in the north of modern-day Scotland, from some point before 1014 until his death in 1020. Findláech's son Macbethad mac Findláech (Mac Bethad), was made famous as the protagonist of William Shakespeare's play Macbeth.

14th century Scottish chronicler and poet Andrew of Wyntoun claims that Findlaech fathered Mac Bethad with Malcolm II of Scotland's second daughter Donalda, as one of several dynastic marriages Malcolm II used to consolidate his own kingship, but there is no other confirmation of this.

== Life and death ==
Modern historians speculate that Findláech was ruling before 1014 because the Orkneyinga saga describes Jarl Siguðr of Orkney fighting a battle with Scots, led by a Jarl Finnlekr, (Norse for Findláech). Irish princess Eithne had made a banner with a raven on it for Siguðr, and the saga records that Siguðr "later" brought the banner to the Battle of Clontarf, in 1014, where he was killed, placing Findláech as ruler of Moray before 1014.

The Annals of Ulster describe Findláech's death as s.a. 1020 Finnloech m. Ruaidhri, ri Alban, a suis occisus est. "Ri Alban" translates as King of Alba, however, the smaller geographical areas within what is now Scotland each had their own local "kings". The 12th century Scottish King Lists only record Malcolm II of Scotland, (Máel Coluim mac Cináeda), as King of Alba at the time, having directly succeeded his father, Kenneth II of Scotland, (Cináed mac Duib). The same Irish annals describe Malcolm as "ard ri Alban", meaning High King of Alba. The Annals of Tigernach describe Findláech as Mormaer of Moray, mormaer being the local word for king.

The Annals of Ulster also state that Findláech was killed by his own people. Succession by family violence, including patricide, was common in Scotland at the time. The Annals of Tigernach tell us that the "sons of Máel Brigte" were responsible. Although the actual killer is not known, two of Brigte's sons, Máel Coluim mac Máil Brigti and Gille Coemgáin, both benefited from the killing by succeeding to the throne.

Findlaech's son Macbeth eventually succeeded to the throne of Moray in 1032, likely by killing Gille Coemgain, and eventually to the throne of Alba, when his soldiers killed Duncan I of Scotland, a verified grandson of Malcom II, but by his eldest daughter Bethóc.

== Bibliography ==
- Anderson, Alan Orr, Early Sources of Scottish History: AD 500-1286, 2 vols., (Edinburgh, 1922)
- Hudson, Benjamin T. (1994). Kings of Celtic Scotland. Westport: Greenwood Press. ISBN 9780313290879.
- Woolf, Alex (2007). From Pictland to Alba 789–1070. Edinburgh: Edinburgh University Press. ISBN 9780748612345.

| Preceded by Ruadrí mac Domnall | Mormaer of Moray before 1014–1020 | Succeeded by Máel Coluim mac Máil Brigti |
