= Constantine III of Scotland =

King of Alba from 995 to 997

Constantine III

King of Alba (Scotland)
- Reign: 995–997
- Predecessor: Kenneth II
- Successor: Kenneth III
- Born: c. 970
- Died: 997; Rathinveramond near Perth
- Burial: Iona
- House: Alpin
- Father: Cuilén, King of Alba

Constantine, son of Cuilén (Middle Gaelic: Causantín mac Cuiléin; Modern Gaelic: Còiseam mac Chailein), known in most modern regnal lists as Constantine III (c. 970 – 997), was king of Alba (Scotland) from 995 to 997. He was the son of King Cuilén. John of Fordun calls him, in Latin, Constantinus Calvus, which translates to Constantine the Bald. (Middle Gaelic: Causantín In Maol) Benjamin Hudson notes that insular authors from Ireland and Scotland typically identified rulers by sobriquets, noting for example the similarly named Eugenius Calvus (Owain Foel), an 11th century King of Strathclyde.

== Background ==
The Scottish monarchy of this period based its succession system on the rule of tanistry. All adult male descendants of previous monarchs were eligible for the throne. The kingship regularly switched from one line of royal descendants to another, though they were all closely related. Constantine was able to rise to the throne, despite his cousin and predecessors having a son of his own. The next two kings (Kenneth III and Malcolm II) were his cousins and killed their respective predecessor to gain the throne. The succession rule had the benefit of ensuring that there would always be an adult king on the throne, avoiding the usual problems of minority reigns. The various kings had their lands and power bases in different areas of Scotland, preventing any single region from claiming full domination of the others. This may have helped the country avoid significant secession movements. The downside was that any single king had to face adult rivals for the throne. His kinsmen had their own ambitions and would not wait for his death from natural causes to achieve them. The succession was often decided through acts of warfare and murder, resulting in early deaths and high casualty rates in the extended royal family.

During the 10th century, there were dynastic conflicts in Scotland between two rival lines of royalty. One descended from Causantín mac Cináeda (Constantine I, reigned 862–877), the other from his brother Áed mac Cináeda (reigned 877–878). Constantine III belonged to the second line. His royal ancestors included Áed himself, Constantine II of Scotland (reigned 900–943), Indulf (reigned 954–962), and Cuilén (reigned 967–971). Amlaíb of Scotland (reigned 973–977) was his paternal uncle. The alternation between the two royal lines seems to have been peaceful for a long time; Alfred P. Smyth regards this early phase as "a century of kingly coexistence". The armed conflict between the lines seems to have started in the 960s when Cuilén challenged the rule of his cousin Dub, King of Scotland (962–967). The initial motivation behind the conflict is unclear. Smyth speculates that control over the Kingdom of Strathclyde might have been a major factor.

== Reign ==
According to John of Fordun (14th century), Kenneth II of Scotland (reigned 971–995) attempted to change the succession rules, allowing "the nearest survivor in blood to the deceased king to succeed", thus securing the throne for his own descendants. He reportedly did so to specifically exclude Constantine (III) and Kenneth (III), called Gryme in this source. The two men then jointly conspired against him, convincing Lady Finella, daughter of Cuncar, Mormaer of Angus, to kill the king. She reportedly did so to achieve personal revenge, as Kenneth II had killed her own son. Entries in the Chronicles of the Picts and Scots, collected by William Forbes Skene, provide the account of Finnguala killing Kenneth II in revenge, but not her affiliation to Constantine or his cousins. These entries date to the 12th and 13th centuries. The Annals of Ulster simply record "Cinaed son of Mael Coluim [Kenneth, son of Malcolm], king of Scotland, was deceitfully killed", with no indication of who killed him.

In the account of John of Fordun, Constantine the Bald, son of king Cullen and Gryme were "plotting unceasingly the death of the king and his son". One day, Kenneth II and his companions went hunting into the woods, "at no great distance from his own abode". The hunt took him to Fettercairn, where Finella resided. She approached him to proclaim her loyalty and invited him to visit her residence, whispering into his ear that she had information about a conspiracy plot. She managed to lure him to "an out-of-the-way little cottage", where a booby trap was hidden. Inside the cottage was a statue, connected by strings to a number of crossbows. If anyone touched or moved the statue, he would trigger the crossbows and fall victim to their arrows. Kenneth II gently touched the statue and "was shot through by arrows sped from all sides, and fell without uttering another word." Finella escaped through the woods and managed to join her abettors, Constantine III and Gryme. The hunting companions soon discovered the bloody king. They were unable to locate Finella but burned Fettercairn to the ground. Smyth dismisses the elaborate plotting and the mechanical contraption as mere fables, but accepts the basic details of the story, that the succession plans of Kenneth II caused his assassination. Alan Orr Anderson raised his own doubts concerning the story of Finella, which he considered "semi-mythical". He noted that the feminine name Finnguala or Findguala means "white shoulders", but suggested it derived from "find-ela" (white swan). The name figures in toponyms such as Finella Hill (near Fordoun) and Finella Den (near St Cyrus), while local tradition in The Mearns (Kincardineshire) has Finella walking atop the treetops from one location to the other. Anderson thus theorized that Finella could be a mythical figure, suggesting she was a local stream-goddess. A later passage of John of Fordun mentions Finele as mother of Macbeth, King of Scotland (reigned 1040–1057), but this is probably an error based on the similarity of names. Macbeth was son of Findláech of Moray, not of a woman called Finella.

The narrative of John of Fordun continues on to the reign of Constantine III. The day following the death of Kenneth II, Constantine the Bald, son of King Cullen usurped the throne. He had reportedly won the support of a number of nobles. The throne was also claimed by his cousin Malcolm II, son of Kenneth II, resulting in long-lasting division of the Scottish population, and conflict. Constantine III reigned for a year and a half [18 months], "continually harassed by Malcolm and his illegitimate uncle, named Kenneth, a soldier of known prowess, who was his unwearied persecutor, and strove with his whole might to kill him, above all others." The Chronicle of the Kings of Scotts (Cronica Regum Scottorum, 12th century) shortens the reign to one year and four months (16 months). This source was a king-list compiled during the reign of William the Lion (reign 1165–1214), the last king mentioned in it. It has survived as the fifth text of the Poppleton manuscript. The existence of Kenneth, illegitimate uncle to Malcolm II, is not recorded in older sources. John of Fordun had apparently listed this Kenneth as an illegitimate son of Malcolm I of Scotland. Skene noted that this could be an error, and suggested that Kenneth, son of Malcolm was actually Kenneth III (Kenneth, son of Dubh). Kenneth III was a grandson of Malcolm I, rather than a son. Robert Shaw also doubted Kenneth II having a brother, illegitimate or not, who was also named Kenneth, pointing out that Malcolm I would have no reason to give the same name to two of his sons. Alex Woolf accepted the identification of Kenneth, son of Malcolm, with Kenneth III as a possible solution, but suggested a number of alternatives. Kenneth II himself was a Kenneth, son of Malcolm; his name could have been transferred to the killer of his successor by a faulty text. Or Kenneth, son of Malcolm, could be an accidental reversal of Malcolm (II), son of Kenneth. Or the killer could be a Kenneth, son of Malcolm who was not actually a member of the royal family.

The Annals of Tigernach report that Constantine was killed in a battle between the Scots in 997: "A battle between the Scots, in which fell Constantine son of Culannan, king of Scotland, and many others." Another entry of the same year reports the death of Máel Coluim I of Strathclyde, though it is unclear if the two deaths were connected. A Chronicle of the Scots and Picts entry adds a number of details. Constantine, son of Culen, was killed by Kenneth, son of Malcolm (see above) at Rathinveramon. Constantine's body was transported for burial to Iona. An entry in the Chronicle of Melrose describes "King Constantine, Culen's son, ... slain by the sword" at the mouth of Almond in Tegalere. Again the killer is reported as Kenneth, son of Malcolm. John of Fordun's narrative is more verbose. According to it, Constantine and Kenneth, son of Malcolm met one day in Laudonia (Lothian), by the banks of the River Almond. They engaged in battle, resulting in great slaughter on both sides and the death of both leaders. The guards of Constantine fled to Gryme (Kenneth III), "colleague" of their leader, allowing him to win the throne. However, news of the battle and its results reached Malcolm (II) in Cumbria. He learned of the death of his "uncle and the rest of his faithful friends", and returned to gather reinforcements for his cause — though he was defeated in his initial conflict against Gryme.

John of Fordun consistently depicts Malcolm II holding Cumbria, emerging from it to combat Constantine III and Kenneth III (or his son Giric). In 1000, Malcolm reportedly defended Cumbria against the invasion of Æthelred the Unready, King of England. A relevant entry from the Anglo-Saxon Chronicle confirms that the Danish fleet which regularly raided England departed in 1000. This sudden relief from attack Æthelred used to gather his thoughts, resources, and armies: the fleet's departure in 1000 "allowed Æthelred to carry out a devastation of Strathclyde, the motive for which is part of the lost history of the north." But this indicates the limits to Constantine's (and Kenneth's) area of authority and informs us that Cumbria/Strathclyde lay beyond them. The opponent of Æthelred is not however specified by the Chronicle. Benjamin Hudson notes that John of Fordun was at times confused when depicting events of this period. The conflict depicted could actually be one between Æthelred and Kenneth III, Scottish and Anglo-Saxons armies fighting over control of Strathclyde — Aethelred wanting to restore Anglo-Saxon control in an area once conquered by Edmund the Elder (reigned 939–946), his grandfather. Perhaps he was desperately seeking to add some revenue to his treasury. Kenneth and the Scots were naturally unwilling to lose an area under their own rule for two generations.

== Location of death ==
James Young Simpson, who had written several articles on archaeology, observed that there were contradictory accounts concerning the location of Constantine's death. While most accounts place the battle near the River Almond, there were two rivers of that name in Scotland, one in Perthshire and one in Lothian. George Chalmers identified the one in Perthshire to have been the intended location, but John of Fordun, the Scotichronicon, Hector Boece, and George Buchanan all point to the one in Lothian. The Chronicle of Melrose places the battle near the River Avon. Andrew of Wyntoun places it near the river "Awyne". John Lesley places it near the River Annan, and considers it part of an ongoing invasion of Cumbria.

There are also contradictions concerning the location of the battle in relation to the river. The Scotichronicon, Melrose, and Wyntoun placed the battle at the river source, Melrose also adding the word "Tegalere" to describe the location. This might be the same as the "Inregale regens" of the Scotichronicon and the "Indegale" of the Liber Dumblain. Boece and Buchanan place the battle at a river mouth, where the Almond enters the Firth of Forth. That is where Cramond is located, called "Crawmond" in some editions of Hector Boece. The "Nomina Regum Scottorum et Pictorum", discovered by Robert Sibbald at the St Andrews Cathedral Priory, places the death sites of both Domnall mac Ailpín and Constantine III at Rathveramoen (Rathinveramon), which etymologically derives from "Rath Inver Amoen", the ráth at the mouth of the Amoen/Amon (the Almond) – viz., the fortress Bertha in Perth, located at the mouth of the Almond. This is where the Almond joins the River Tay near Scone. Rathinveramon also lay at a short distance from Perth. Monzievaird, where Kenneth III was eventually killed, was about 15 miles from Perth. Forteviot, connected to Kenneth MacAlpin and his death, is also located in Perthshire.

Alex Woolf points out that the Chronicle of the Kings of Alba reports another location for the death of Domnall mac Ailpín: the palace of Cinnbelathoir, which was probably the same as the "Bellathor", mentioned alongside "Rigmonath" as the major settlements of their time. Rigmonath has been identified with Rigmonaid, another name for St Andrews. Since Rigmonath was a church-settlement, perhaps the same was true for Bellathor. Seeking a likely location in the vicinity of Rathinveramon, Woolf suggests that Bellathor was an older name for Scone. The location was used for the inauguration ceremonies of kings, pointing at the significance of the area. Earlier the same area, including Forteviot, had served as the population centre of the southern Picts. The lack of fortification at Forteviot could indicate that it too served as a church site, one associated with the kings. Already in 728, there is mention of a Pictish royal stronghold at the hill of Moncrieffe, where the River Tay meets the River Earn. The location lies just outside Perth, 8 km from Forteviot, close to both Abernethy and Scone, suggesting that the area long served as a "key royal centre", though the central location switched over time from Moncrieffe to Forteviot to Scone.

In the 18th century, there was a theory that the Cat Stane of Kirkliston could be connected to the final battle of Constantine III. The Reverend John Muckarsie alluded to this idea, in a text eventually collected in the Statistical Account of Scotland by Sir John Sinclair, 1st Baronet. In 1780, the founding meeting of the Society of Antiquaries of Scotland took place. Its founder David Erskine, 11th Earl of Buchan mentioned the idea in his opening discourse. He noted an extant transcription of the Cat Stane's text, reading: "IN HOC TUM- JAC – CONSTAN- VIC- VICT". Where "Constan" was understood to have been Constantine IV (III). The speech was recorded in The Scots Magazine. The idea went that the Cat Stane was erected as a memorial for Constantine, at the location where the man lost his life in battle. The New Statistical Account went a bit further, suggesting that the stone marked the burial place of Constantine. Simpson strongly opposed this theory, finding it unlikely that such a monument would be erected for Constantine the Bald, a king who fell in a civil war, with no family legacy, and who was treated with contempt by primary sources. He examined other transcriptions of the texts, where the word "Constan" was absent, eventually dismissing the theory as based on a faulty reading of the original text.

== Reputation ==
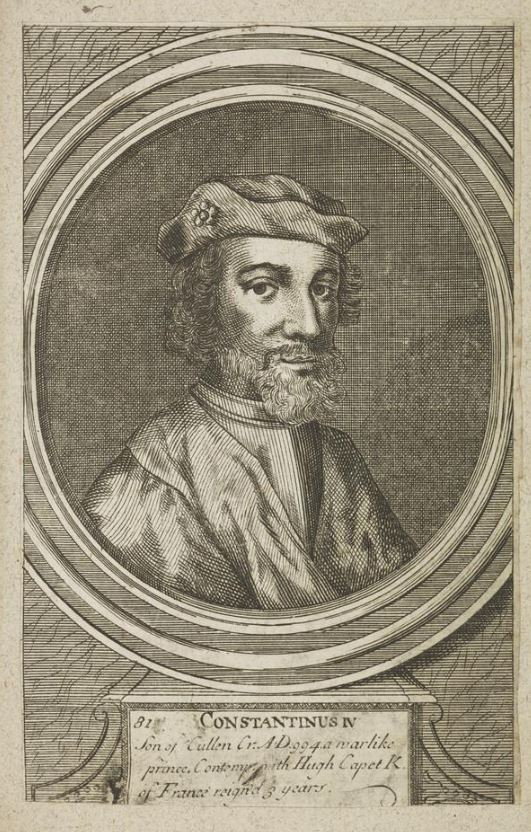
17th century portrait, when he was reckoned as Constantine IV

The stanzas of The Prophecy of Berchán covering Constantine III give him a mostly negative assessment: "A king will take [the sovereignty], who will not be king; after him, Scotland will be nothing. It will be the weak following the strong; though true is what my lips relate. A king with reproach above his head; alas for Scotland during his short time! Feeble men will be about him, in the region of Scone, of melodious shields. A year and a half (a bright space), that will be his whole reign; from taking Gaels (hostages?) he will go to death; he falls, his people fall. He will fight great battles in Scotland; by the disgrace of his head, he will destroy colours. He will be in communion of battle, from Stirling to Abertay. Anderson suggested that this would be the area from Stirling to Tentsmuir (Abertay Sands), the traditional Scottish boundary with "Danish Northumbria" (Jórvík).

Berchán gave a negative portrayal of Kenneth II as well, calling him "the Fratricide", who "would bring danger on everyone". Kenneth II "would attack his own people as well as his enemies", probably alluding to Kenneth killing members of the Scottish nobility, people who were related to him in various ways. Hudson suspects that further details on the killings of Kenneth II could be found in lost works, part of an early Scottish literal tradition, which left only fragments in later works. While Kenneth II is depicted as a strong king, Constantine III is dismissed as a failure. The length of his reign (18 months) confirms that Constantine is the failed "non-king" intended, a king surrounded by weak men. The poem places his death by the River Tay, though this is not necessarily a contradiction to other accounts of his death (which place it by river Almond). The Almond flows into the Tay in a location not far from Scone, also recorded as the place of death of a previous king, Domnall mac Ailpín (reigned 859–862).

The ominous verse which has Constantine fall with his people might allude to the end of his family, as his line probably died with him. The name Grim/Gryme for his successor Kenneth III probably derives from "greimm" (Middle Irish: authority). Berchán calls this man donn: as an adjective it means "brown", but as a noun, the meaning changes to "chief" (prince, lord), depicting him as a stronger king.

== Legacy ==
Constantine is not known to have any descendants and he was the last of the line of Áed (Áed mac Cináeda) to have been king. With his death, the rivalry between descendants of Causantin and Áed gave way to a rivalry between two new royal lines, both descended from Causantin. One line descended from Kenneth II and was represented by his son Malcolm II. The other line descended from his brother Dub, King of Scotland (reigned 962–967) and was represented by Kenneth III.

Constantine III of Scotland House of Alpin Born: bef. 971 Died: 997
Regnal titles
Preceded by Kenneth II	King of Alba; 995–997	Succeeded by Kenneth III
