= Monarchs of the British Isles =

Monarchs of the British Isles may refer to monarchs within any of the following:

- List of English monarchs
- List of Scottish monarchs
- List of rulers in Wales
- List of British monarchs
- Monarchy of the United Kingdom
- Monarchy of Ireland
