= Kenneth III of Scotland =

King of Alba from 997 to 1005

Kenneth III

King of Alba (Scotland)
- Reign: 997 – c. 25 March 1005
- Predecessor: Constantine III
- Successor: Malcolm II
- Born: c. 966
- Died: c. 25 March 1005 (aged 38–39); Monzievaird
- Burial: Iona
- Issue: Boite mac Cináeda ? Gille Coemgáin ? Giric mac Cináeda; Suibne ?
- House: Alpin
- Father: Dub, King of Alba

Cináed mac Duib (Modern Gaelic: Coinneach mac Dhuibh; c. 966 – c. 25 March 1005), anglicised as Kenneth III, and nicknamed An Donn ("the Chief" or "the Brown"), was King of Alba (Scotland) from 997 to 1005. He was the son of Dub (Dub mac Maíl Coluim). Many of the Scots sources refer to him as Giric son of Kenneth son of Dub, which is taken to be an error. An alternate explanation is that Kenneth had a son, Giric, who ruled jointly with his father.

== Reign and descendants ==
The primary sources concerning the life and "reign" of Giric include chronicle entries dating to the years 1251 and 1317. They can be found in The Chronicles of the Picts and Scots of William Forbes Skene. The chronicle of John of Fordun (14th century) mentions Giric as "Grim" or "Gryme", reporting him killed by King Malcolm II. Giric is not mentioned by earlier sources, which would make his existence questionable. John Bannerman theorised that mac Duib, the Gaelic patronymic of Kenneth III, evolved to the surnames Duff and MacDuff, and that Kenneth III could be a direct ancestor to Clan MacDuff, which produced all mormaers and earls of Fife from the 11th to the mid-14th century, noting that Giric could be the actual founder of the house, following a pattern of several Scottish clans seemingly founded by grandsons of their eponym.

The only event reported in Kenneth's reign is the killing of Dúngal mac Cináeda by Gille Coemgáin mac Cináeda, by the Annals of the Four Masters s.a. 999. It is not certain that this refers to events in Scotland, and whether one or both were sons of this Kenneth, or of King Kenneth II or some other person or persons, is not known. A "Gilla Caemgein son of Cinaed" also appears in the Annals of Ulster. An entry from the year 1035 reports that his unnamed granddaughter and her husband Cathal, son of Amalgaid, were both killed by Cellach, son of Dúnchad. This Cathal was reportedly King of the Western Laigin, possibly connected to the Kings of Leinster. The context is unclear, but this is likely the same Gille Coemgáin, connected to Kenneth III.

Kenneth III was killed in battle at Monzievaird in Strathearn by King Malcolm II (Máel Coluim mac Cináeda), which took place about 25 March 1005. Whether Boite mac Cináeda was a son of this Kenneth, or of Kenneth II, is uncertain, although most propose this Kenneth. A son, or grandson of Boite, was reported to be killed by Malcolm II in 1032 in the Annals of Ulster. The relevant entry has been translated as: "The grandson of Baete son of Cinaed was killed by Mael Coluim son of Cinaed".

Boite's daughter, Gruoch (Gruoch ingen Boite meic Cináeda) – William Shakespeare's Lady Macbeth – was wife firstly of Gille Coemgáin, mormaer of Moray, and secondly of King Macbeth; her son by Gille Coemgáin, Lulach (Lulach mac Gille Coemgáin), succeeded Macbeth as King of Scotland. The meic Uilleim, descendants of William fitz Duncan by his first marriage, were probably descended from Kenneth; and the Clann Mac Aoidh or Clan Mackay claim descent from Kenneth III through Lulach's daughter.

The theory that Clan MacDuff were descendants of Kenneth III was based on their close connection to royalty. Andrew of Wyntoun reported that Malcolm III (reigned 1058–1093) had granted to a "MacDuff, thane of Fife" the privilege of enthroning the kings at their inauguration. John of Fordun has Malcolm III promise this same unnamed MacDuff that he will be the first man of the kingdom, second only to the King. This unnamed MacDuff appears frequently in stories connected to the rise of Malcolm III to the throne and was later immortalised in the Shakespearean character Macduff. The status of the successive heads of this clan as the "senior inaugural official" seems confirmed by records of the inauguration ceremonies of Alexander II (reigned 1214–1249) and Alexander III (reigned 1249–1286). Earlier heads of this house "witnessed royal documents far more frequently" than other members of the nobility; their names were often listed first among the lay witnesses, ahead of both the native Scottish nobility and the Anglo-Norman nobles. Many 12th-century heads of house served as justiciars of Scotia. Their leaders were named Donnchadh (Duncan), Mael-Coluim (Malcolm), and Causantin (Constantine), names shared by the royal family, making a close relation to the reigning royal house likely. Bannerman suggests that the MacDuffs had their own, legitimate claim to the Scottish throne, which they declined to pursue, having been compensated with privileges by Malcolm III and his descendants.

== Interpretation ==
During the 10th century, there were dynastic conflicts in Scotland between two rival lines of royalty: one descended from Causantín mac Cináeda (Constantine I, reigned 862–877), the other from his brother Áed mac Cináeda (reigned 877–878). John of Fordun claims that Kenneth II of Scotland (reigned 971–995) attempted to establish new succession rules, which would limit the right to the throne to his own descendants, excluding all other claimants. While Constantine III of Scotland (reigned 995–997) did manage to rise to the throne, he was the last known descendant of Áed. With his death, the rivalry between descendants of Causantin and Áed gave way to a rivalry between two new royal lines, both descended from Causantin.

One line descended from Kenneth II and was represented by his son Malcolm II. The other line descended from his brother Dub, King of Scotland (reigned 962–967) and was represented by Kenneth III. Neither Constantine III nor Kenneth III were able to extend their control to Cumbria, which likely served as a stronghold and power base for Malcolm II. He was the legitimate heir according to the succession rules of Kenneth II. When Malcolm II managed to kill Kenneth III, it signified the triumph of his line. He continued to rule until 1034, enjoying a long reign, and managed to leave the throne to his own descendants.

However, the rivalry between the two lines survived Kenneth III. In 1033, Malcolm II killed a descendant of Kenneth III. Gruoch, another descendant of Kenneth III, was the consort of Macbeth, King of Scotland (reigned 1040–1057), whose rival Duncan I (reigned 1034–1040) was the grandson and heir of Malcolm II. They continued the bitter feud which had started in the previous century.

The contemporary kings of Strathclyde were also involved in the feud, though it is uncertain whether they had dynastic connections with the various Scottish rival lines. A theory that they represented another line of descendants of Donald II of Scotland (reigned 889–900) was based on the idea that Owen I of Strathclyde (d. 937) was the son of this king.

== Kenneth in fiction ==
The death of Kenneth III is mentioned in Lewis Grassic Gibbon's novel Cloud Howe.

Kenneth III appeared in Gargoyles (comics), written by Greg Weisman.

Kenneth III of Scotland House of Alpin Born: before 967 Died: 25 March 1005
Regnal titles
Preceded by Constantine III	King of Alba; 997–1005	Succeeded by Malcolm II
