= Battle of Lumphanan =

1057 battle between Macbeth and Malcolm III of Scotland

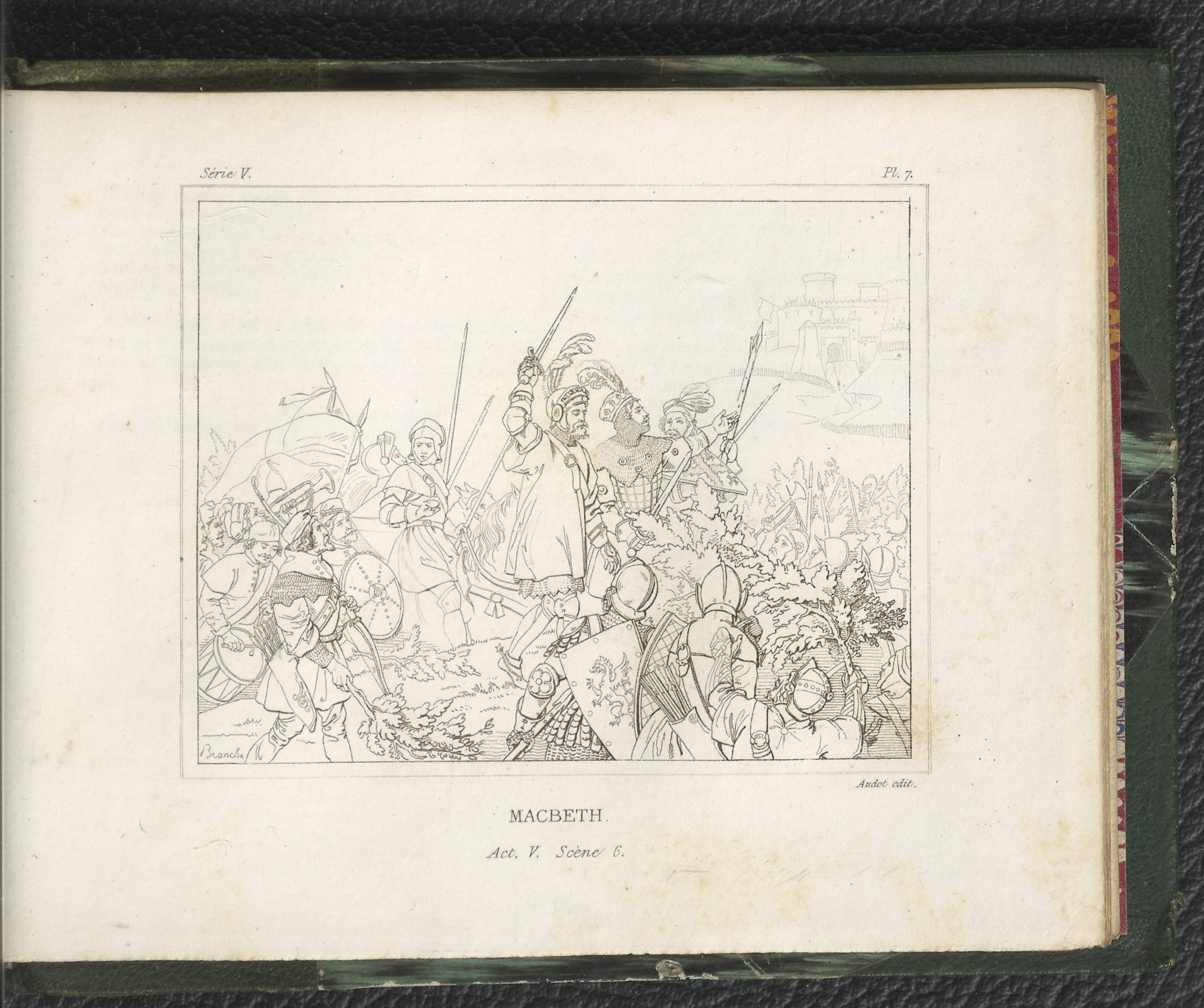
- Macbeth going to his final battle (illustration from the English book The Gallery of Shakespeare, 1830)
Date	15 August 1057
Location	Lumphanan, Aberdeenshire, Scotland 57.11974°N 2.70375°W
Result	Victory for rebels under Malcolm III

Belligerents
Scottish Crown	Rebels

Commanders and leaders
King Macbeth †	Malcolm Canmore
- Location within Aberdeenshire

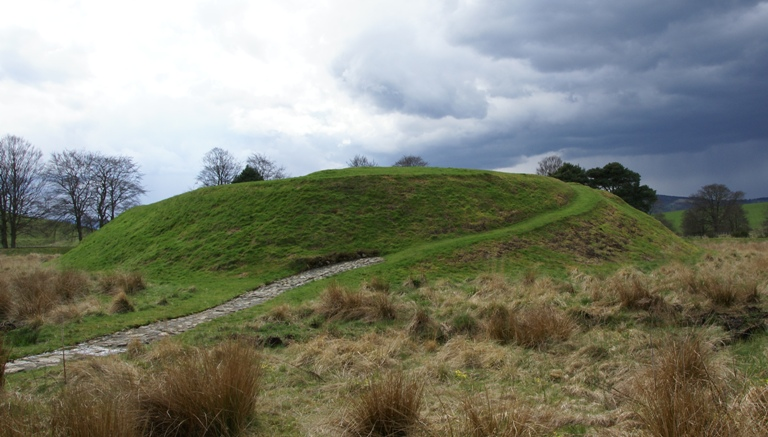
Peel Ring of Lumphanan, Aberdeenshire, Scotland

The Battle of Lumphanan was fought on 15 August 1057, between Macbeth, King of Scots, and the future King Malcolm III. Macbeth would die from wounds sustained in the battle, which came after his defeat at the battle of Dunsinane in 1054. According to tradition, the battle took place at Lumphanan in Aberdeenshire. Macbeth's Stone, a large boulder at the site, is said to mark the spot where Macbeth was mortally wounded. Following the battle, Lulach - Macbeth's stepson - was crowned King, before being killed by Malcolm who then took the throne.

== Background ==
Since the death of his father, King Duncan, in battle with Macbeth, Malcolm had been sheltered by Earl Siward of Northumbria, his uncle. It was with Siward's backing that Malcolm first attacked Macbeth leading to the battle of Dunsinane in 1054, where Malcolm failed to win the crown, but had his own lands restored to him. Some sources say it was Edward the Confessor, King of England, who ordered Siward to launch this invasion of Scotland.

== The battle ==
After retreating North, Macbeth would again face Malcolm in battle at Lumphanan, in modern day Aberdeenshire. The battle itself appears to have been a comparatively minor affair, except for Macbeth being mortally wounded and later dying. Sources describe the battle as taking place "in a wood".

Macbeth's Stone, a large boulder at the site, is traditionally held to mark the location where Macbeth was wounded.

== Aftermath ==
Following the death of Macbeth, his stepson Lulach was initially crowned king. 18 weeks later, in 1058 Malcolm killed him by 'treachery' at Essie, near Aberdeen. Upon assuming the throne, Malcolm, with the help of his English queen, Margaret, began the long task of removing Gaelic culture from mainstream Scotland.
