= Crínán of Dunkeld =

11th-century abbot of the monastery of Dunkeld

- Abbot of Dunkeld
- Born: c. 975
- Died: 1045
- Spouse: Bethóc
- Issue: Duncan I of Scotland; Daughter; Maldred of Allerdale
- House: House of Dunkeld
- Father: Duncan, abbot of Dunkeld (possibly)

Crínán of Dunkeld, also called Crinan the Thane (c. 975 – 1045), was the erenagh, or hereditary lay-abbot, of Dunkeld Abbey and, similarly to Irish "royal- and warrior-abbots" of the same period like the infamous case of Fedelmid mac Crimthainn, led armies into battle and was very likely also the Mormaer of Atholl during the events later fictionalized in William Shakespeare's verse drama The Tragedy of Macbeth. Although he does not appear in Shakespeare's play, he was the legitimately married son-in-law of King Malcolm II of Scotland, the father of King Duncan I of Scotland, and the grandfather of King Malcolm III of Scotland. Through his far more famous grandson, for whose claim to the throne of Scotland the abbot laid down his life in battle against his nephew, the Scottish High King Macbeth, Abbot Crínán is the ancestor of every subsequent monarch of the House of Dunkeld. His descendants would reign over the Kingdom of Scotland until the accidental death of King Alexander III in 1286, which ultimately precipitated a battle between 13 Competitors for the Crown of Scotland and an invasion of Scotland by King Edward Longshanks, which was followed by the Scottish Wars of Independence.

== Family ==
In the year 1000, Crínán was married to Bethóc, daughter of Malcolm II of Scotland (reigned from 1005 to 1034). As Malcolm had no surviving sons, this allowed a hereditary claim to the Scottish throne to descend to Crínán and Bethóc's son, Duncan I, who reigned from 1034 to 1040. Two additional children have been attributed to Crínán: a daughter who was mother of Moddan, Earl of Caithness, and a son Maldred. The latter is said by De obsessione Dunelmi to have been son of Crinan, tein (thegn Crínán). He was identified as Crínán of Dunkeld by historian W. F. Skene, though this identity has been challenged as insufficiently supported or erroneous by some scholars, such as G. W. S. Barrow. Maldred married Ealdgyth, daughter of Uhtred the Bold and granddaughter of King Æthelred the Unready, and was father of Gospatric, Earl of Northumbria and ancestor of the Earls of Home and the Earls of Dunbar.

Crínán may have spent some time in exile in England under the patronage of Æthelred and/or Cnut before becoming abbot of Dunkeld. Neil McGuigan suggests that he may be the moneyer named Crínán who appears on some of the coinage during Cnut's reign, between 1017 and 1023. It may have been during this period that the marriage of Maldred and Ealdgyth was arranged.

In 1045, Crínán of Dunkeld rose in rebellion against Macbeth in support of his 14-year-old grandson, Malcolm III's claim to the throne. Malcolm was the elder son of Crínán's son, the late King Duncan, who predeceased his father. However, Crínán, by then an elderly man, was killed in a battle at Dunkeld, as was his son Maldred of Allerdale.

== Abbot of Dunkeld ==
Dunkeld Abbey was founded as a daughter foundations of Iona Abbey on the north bank of the River Tay in the 6th century or early 7th century following the missionary expeditions of St Columba into the land of the Picts. It may have continued to draw its hierarchy from the Cenél Conaill of Donegal. Iain Moncreiffe argued that Crinán belonged to a Scottish sept of the Irish Cenél Conaill royal dynasty. Alternatively, Christopher Cairney proposed a Cenél nEógain descent for the House of Dunkeld.

While the title of Hereditary Abbot (coarb in Gaelic) was a feudal position that was often exercised in name only, Crinán does seem to have acted as Abbot in charge of the monastery in his time. He was thus a man of high position in both clerical and secular society.

The magnificent semi-ruined Dunkeld Cathedral, built in stages between 1260 and 1501, stands today on the grounds once occupied by the monastery. The Cathedral contains the only surviving remains of the previous monastic society: a course of red stone visible in the east choir wall that may have been re-used from an earlier building, and two stone ninth – or tenth-century cross-slabs in the Cathedral Museum.

Walter Bower and John of Fordun do not identify Crínán as abbot of Dunkeld but accord him the offices of abbot of Dull and seneschal of the Isles.

== External source ==
- Clans and Families of Ireland and Scotland
