= Máel Brigte =

- Gender: Male

Origin
- Origin: Irish
- Meaning: devotee of St Brigid
- Region of origin: Irish

Máel Brigte is a Pictish or Irish name meaning "devotee of St Brigid".

== People with the given name ==
- Máel Ísu I of Cennrígmonaid, a.k.a. Máel Brigte I of Cennrígmonaid, 10th-century Bishop
- Máel Brigte of Moray 9th-century Pictish Mormaer of Moray
- Máel Brigte of Perth, 12th-century Scottish administrator
- Máel Brigte mac Tornáin, 10th century Abbot of Iona
- Máel Brigte úa Máel Úanaig, the writer of the 12th century illuminated manuscript, the Gospels of Máel Brigte
- Marianus Scotus, 11th-century Irish monk and chronicler
