= Lulach =

King of Alba from 1057 to 1058

King of Alba
- Reign: 15 August 1057 – 17 March 1058
- Inauguration: 8 September 1057, Scone
- Predecessor: Macbeth
- Successor: Malcolm III
- Born: c. 1032; Moray, Scotland
- Died: 17 March 1058 (aged 25/26); Essie, Strathbogie
- Burial: Iona
- Issue: Máel Snechtai; Unnamed daughter
- House: Moray
- Father: Gille Coemgáin of Moray
- Mother: Gruoch of Scotland

Lulach mac Gille Coemgáin (Modern Gaelic: Lughlagh mac Gille Chomghain, known in English simply as Lulach, and nicknamed Tairbith, "the Unfortunate" and Fatuus, "the Simple-minded" or "the Foolish"; c. 1032 – 17 March 1058) was King of Alba (Scotland) between 15 August 1057 and 17 March 1058.

Lulach was the son of Gruoch of Scotland, from her first marriage to Gille Coemgáin, Mormaer of Moray, and thus the stepson of Macbeth (Mac Bethad mac Findlaích). Through his mother, he was also the great-grandson of either Kenneth II or Kenneth III. Following the death of Macbeth at the Battle of Lumphanan on 15 August 1057, the king's followers placed Lulach on the throne. He has the distinction of being the first king of Scotland of whom there are inauguration details available: he was inaugurated, probably on 8 September 1057 at Scone. Lulach appears to have been a weak king, as his nicknames suggest, and ruled only for a few months before being assassinated and usurped by Malcolm III. However, it is also plausible his nicknames are the results of negative propaganda, and were established as part of a smear campaign by Malcolm III.

Lulach's son Máel Snechtai was Mormaer of Moray, while Óengus of Moray was the son of Lulach's daughter.

He is believed to be buried on Saint Columba's Holy Island of Iona in or around the monastery. The exact position of his grave is unknown.

== Depictions in fiction ==
Lulach is a protagonist in Joel H. Morris's historical novel All Our Yesterdays: A Novel of Lady Macbeth, published by Putnam Books in 2024, where he is referred to as "the Boy." A prequel to the play, the novel interweaves the historical Lady Macbeth and her son with the characters depicted in Shakespeare's tragedy.

Lulach is an important secondary character in Dorothy Dunnett's historical novel King Hereafter, where he is portrayed as a seer. In the novel, Dunnett used Lulach as a mouthpiece for researched information about the real Macbeth.

Lulach is also one of the protagonists in Jackie French's children's novel Macbeth and Son and in Susan Fraser King's novel Lady MacBeth.

Lulach is also a character in David Greig's play Dunsinane where he is hunted by the English soldiers as a threat to peace in Malcolm's Scotland.

Lulach McPritchett in Modern Family is a Scottish warrior and ancestor of Jay Pritchett.

Lulach — misnamed Luach — appears in the animated series Gargoyles (TV series) as Macbeth and Gruoch's son, and, briefly, King of Scotland.

Lulach appears in a 2024 adaptation of Shakespeare's play called Gruoch and Macbeth: A Screenplay by Graham J. Howard.

Lulach appears in Val McDermid's Queen Macbeth.

Lulach House of Moray Born: c. 1032 Died: 17 March 1058
Regnal titles
Preceded by Macbeth	King of Alba; 1057–1058	Succeeded by Malcolm III
Preceded by Macbeth	Mormaer of Moray; 1057–1058	Succeeded by Máel Snechtai
