= Macbeth, King of Scotland =

Scottish king from 1040 to 1057

Macbeth
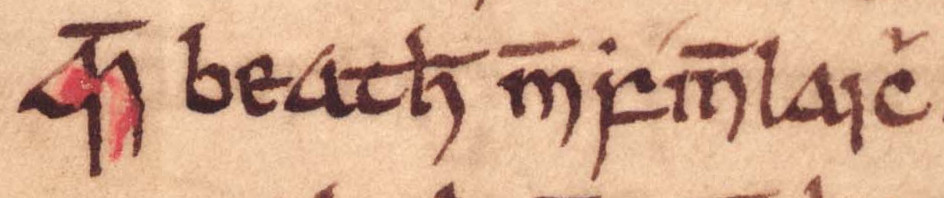
- The name Mac Beathad Mac Fhindlaích in the Annals of Ulster

King of Alba
- Reign: 14 August 1040 – 15 August 1057
- Predecessor: Duncan I
- Successor: Lulach

Mormaer of Moray
- Reign: 1032–1057
- Predecessor: Gille Coemgáin
- Successor: Lulach
- Died: 15 August 1057; Lumphanan
- Burial: Iona
- Spouse: Gruoch
- House: Moray
- Father: Findláech
- Mother: Donada (presumed)

Macbethad mac Findláech (anglicised as Macbeth MacFinlay; died 15 August 1057), nicknamed the Red King (Middle Irish: Rí Deircc), was King of Scotland from 1040 until his death in 1057, during a period when the Scottish kingdom is referred to as the Kingdom of Alba.

Little is known about Macbeth's early life, although he was the son of Findláech of Moray and may have been a grandson of Malcolm II, presumably through the latter's daughter, Donada. He became Mormaer (Earl) of Moray – a semi-autonomous province – in 1032, and was probably responsible for the death of the previous mormaer, Gille Coemgáin. He subsequently married Gille Coemgáin's widow, Gruoch.

In 1040, Duncan I launched an attack into Moray and was killed in action by Macbeth's troops. Macbeth succeeded him as King of Alba, apparently with little opposition. His 17-year reign was mostly peaceful, although in 1054 he was faced with an English invasion, led by Siward, Earl of Northumbria, on behalf of Edward the Confessor. Macbeth was killed at the Battle of Lumphanan in 1057 by forces loyal to the future Malcolm III. He was buried on Iona, the traditional resting place of Scottish kings.

Macbeth was succeeded by his stepson Lulach, but Lulach ruled for only a few months before also being killed in battle against Malcolm III, whose descendants ruled Scotland until the late 13th century.

A fictionalised version of Macbeth is best known as the main character of William Shakespeare's tragedy of the same name and the many works that it has inspired. Shakespeare's Macbeth is based on Holinshed's Chronicles (published in 1577) and is not historically accurate.

== Name ==
The name Mac Bethad (or, in modern Gaelic, MacBheatha), from which the anglicised "MacBeth" is derived, means "son of life". Although it has the appearance of a Gaelic patronymic it does not have any meaning of filiation but instead carries an implication of a righteous man or religious man. An alternative proposed derivation is that it is a corruption of macc-bethad meaning "one of the elect".

Macbeth's full name in Middle Irish (medieval Gaelic) was Macbethad mac Findláech. This is realised as MacBheatha mac Fhionnlaigh in modern Scottish Gaelic, and is rendered Macbeth MacFinlay (also spelled Finley, Findlay, or Findley) in modern English. Mac Findláech is a Gaelic patronymic meaning "son of Findláech", referring to his father Findláech of Moray.

== Royal ancestry ==
Some sources make Macbeth a grandson of King Malcolm II, presumably through his daughter Donada, and thus a cousin to Duncan I, whom he succeeded. He was possibly also a cousin to Thorfinn the Mighty, Earl of Orkney and Caithness.

== Mormaer and marriage ==
When Cnut the Great came north in 1031 to accept the submission of King Malcolm II, Macbeth too submitted to him:

... Malcolm, king of the Scots, submitted to him, and became his man, with two other kings, Macbeth and Iehmarc ...

Some have seen this as a sign of Macbeth's power; others have seen his presence, together with Iehmarc, who may be Echmarcach mac Ragnaill, as proof that Malcolm II was overlord of Moray and of the Kingdom of the Isles. Whatever the true state of affairs in the early 1030s, it seems more probable that Macbeth was subject to the king of Alba, Malcolm II, who died at Glamis, on 25 November 1034. The Prophecy of Berchán, apparently alone in near-contemporary sources, says that Malcolm died a violent death: calling it a "kinslaying" without actually naming his killers. Tigernach's chronicle says only:

Máel Coluim son of Cináed, king of Alba, the honour of western Europe, died.

He became Mormaer (Earl) of Moray – a semi-autonomous province – in 1032, and was probably responsible for the death of the previous mormaer, Gille Coemgáin. Macbeth's father Findláech of Moray had been killed by Gille Coemgáin. He subsequently married Gille Coemgáin's widow, Gruoch, but they had no children together. Macbeth later accepted her son from Gille Coemgáin, Lulach, as his heir. Gruoch may have had a claim to the Scottish throne herself, being the granddaughter of either Kenneth II or Kenneth III. It is unclear if Macbeth married Gruoch as an ally succoring the widow of a kinsman, or as a conqueror claiming the widow of an enemy. It is also possible he may have married her to retain power over Moray as well as increase his own claim to the Scottish throne using his marriage to a potential claimant to the same throne.

Malcolm II's grandson Duncan (Donnchad mac Crínáin), later King Duncan I, was acclaimed as king of Alba on 30 November 1034, apparently without opposition. Duncan appears to have been tánaise ríg, the king in waiting, so that, far from being an abandonment of tanistry, as has sometimes been argued, his kingship was a vindication of the practice. Previous successions had involved strife between various rígdomna – men of royal blood. Far from being the aged King Duncan of Shakespeare's play, the real King Duncan was a young man in 1034, and even at his death in 1040 his youthfulness is remarked upon.

Duncan's early reign was apparently uneventful. His later reign, in line with his description as "the man of many sorrows" in the Prophecy of Berchán, was not successful. In 1039, Strathclyde was attacked by the Northumbrians, and a retaliatory raid led by Duncan against Durham turned into a disaster. Duncan survived the defeat, but the following year he led an army north into Moray, Macbeth's domain, apparently on a punitive expedition against Moray. There he was killed in action, at the battle of Bothnagowan, now Pitgaveny, near Elgin, by the men of Moray led by Macbeth, probably on 14 August 1040.

== King of Alba ==
On Duncan's death, Macbeth became king. Had his reign not been universally accepted, resistance would have been expected, but none is known to have occurred. In 1045, Duncan's father Crínán of Dunkeld (a scion of the Scottish branch of the Cenél Conaill and Hereditary Abbot of Iona) was killed in a battle between two Scottish armies. Duncan's younger brother Maldred of Allerdale is believed to have died in the same battle, the family fighting Macbeth in defence of Duncan I's young son Máel Coluim (later Malcolm III).

John of Fordun wrote that Duncan's wife fled Scotland, taking her children, including the future kings Malcolm III (Máel Coluim mac Donnchada) and Donald III (Domnall Bán mac Donnchada, or Donalbane) with her. On the basis of the authors' beliefs as to whom Duncan married, various places of exile, Northumbria and Orkney among them, have been proposed. However, E. William Robertson proposes the safest place for Duncan's widow and her children would be with her or Duncan's kin and supporters in Atholl.

After the defeat of Crínán, Macbeth was evidently unchallenged. Marianus Scotus tells how the king made a pilgrimage to Rome in 1050, where, Marianus says, he gave money to the poor as if it were seed.

=== Karl Hundason ===
The Orkneyinga Saga says that a dispute between Thorfinn Sigurdsson, Earl of Orkney, and Karl Hundason began when Karl Hundason became "King of Scots" and claimed Caithness. The identity of Karl Hundason, unknown to Scots and Irish sources, has long been a matter of dispute, and it is far from clear that the matter is settled. The most common assumption is that Karl Hundason was an insulting byname (Old Norse for "Churl, son of a Dog") given to Macbeth by his enemies. William Forbes Skene's suggestion that he was Duncan I of Scotland has been revived in recent years. Lastly, the idea that the whole affair is a poetic invention has been raised.

According to the Orkneyinga Saga, in the war which followed, Thorfinn defeated Karl in a sea-battle off Deerness at the east end of the Orkney Mainland. Then Karl's nephew Mutatan or Muddan, appointed to rule Caithness for him, was killed at Thurso by Thorkel the Fosterer. Finally, a great battle at Tarbat Ness on the south side of the Dornoch Firth ended with Karl defeated and fugitive or dead. Thorfinn, the saga says, then marched south through Scotland as far as Fife, burning and plundering as he passed. A later note in the saga claims that Thorfinn won nine Scottish earldoms.

Whoever Karl Hundason may have been, it appears that the saga is reporting a local conflict with a Scots ruler of Moray or Ross:

[T]he whole narrative is consistent with the idea that the struggle of Thorfinn and Karl is a continuation of that which had been waged since the ninth century by the Orkney earls, notably Sigurd Rognvald's son, Ljot, and Sigurd the Stout, against the princes or mormaers of Moray, Sutherland, Ross, and Argyll, and that, in fine, Malcolm and Karl were mormaers of one of these four provinces.

=== Final years ===
In 1052, Macbeth was involved indirectly in the strife in the Kingdom of England between Godwin, Earl of Wessex and Edward the Confessor when he received a number of Norman exiles from England in his court. In 1054, Edward's Earl of Northumbria, Siward, led a very large invasion of Scotland (Suthed, Duncan's widow and Malcolm's mother, was Northumbrian-born; it is probable but not proven that there was a family tie between Siward and Malcolm). The campaign led to a bloody battle at Dunsinane, in which the Annals of Ulster reported 3,000 Scots and 1,500 English dead, which can be taken as meaning very many on both sides. One of Siward's sons and a son-in-law were among the dead. The result of the invasion was that one Máel Coluim, "son of the king of the Cumbrians" (not to be confused with Máel Coluim mac Donnchada, the future Malcolm III of Scotland) was restored to his throne, i.e., as ruler of the kingdom of Strathclyde. It may be that the events of 1054 are responsible for the idea, which appears in Shakespeare's play, that Malcolm III was put in power by the English.

Macbeth did not survive the English invasion for long, for he was defeated and mortally wounded or killed by the future Malcolm III ("King Malcolm Ceann-mor", son of Duncan I) on the north side of the Mounth in 1057, after retreating with his men over the Cairnamounth Pass to take his last stand at the battle of Lumphanan. The Prophecy of Berchán has it that he was wounded and died at Scone, sixty miles to the south, some days later. Macbeth's stepson Lulach was installed as king soon after, but was killed in 1058 by Malcolm who succeeded him.

Unlike later writers, no near-contemporary source remarks on Macbeth as a tyrant. The Duan Albanach, which survives in a form dating to the reign of Malcolm III, calls him "Mac Bethad the renowned". The Prophecy of Berchán, a verse history which purports to be a prophecy, describes him as "the generous king of Fortriu", and says:

The red, tall, golden-haired one, he will be pleasant to me among them; Scotland will be brimful west and east during the reign of the furious red one.

== Life to legend ==
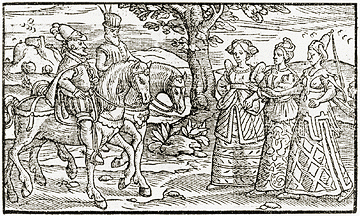
Macbeth and Banquo encounter the witches. Illustration from Holinshed's Chronicles (1577).

Macbeth's life, like that of King Duncan I, had progressed far towards legend by the end of the 14th century, when John of Fordun and Andrew of Wyntoun wrote their histories. Hector Boece, Walter Bower, and George Buchanan all contributed to the legend.

=== William Shakespeare's depiction and its influence ===
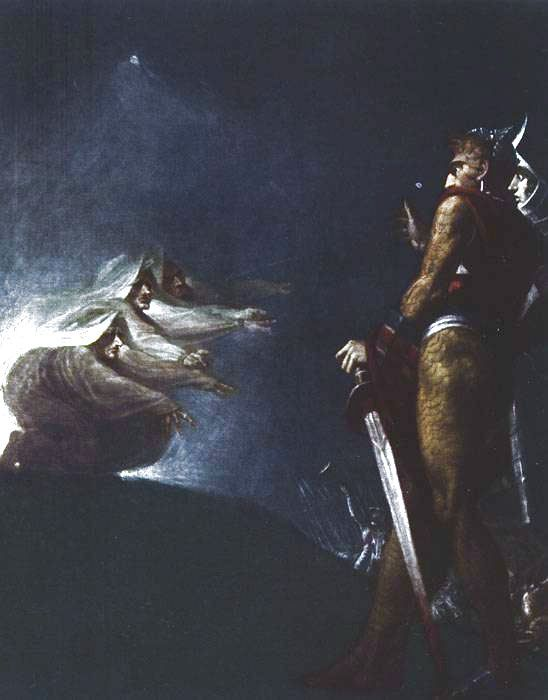
Macbeth and the witches, painting by Henry Fuseli

In Shakespeare's play, which is based mainly upon Raphael Holinshed's account and probably first performed in 1606, Macbeth is initially a valiant and loyal general to the elderly King Duncan. After being manipulated by Three Witches and his wife, Lady Macbeth, Macbeth murders Duncan and usurps the throne. Ultimately, the prophecies of the witches prove misleading, and Macbeth becomes a murderous tyrant. Duncan's son Malcolm stages a revolt against Macbeth, during which a guilt-ridden Lady Macbeth commits suicide. During battle, Macbeth encounters Macduff, a refugee nobleman whose wife and children had earlier been murdered on Macbeth's orders. Upon realising that he will die if he duels with Macduff, Macbeth at first refuses to do so. But when Macduff explains that if Macbeth surrenders he will be subjected to ridicule by his former subjects, Macbeth vows, "I will not yield to kiss the ground before young Malcolm's feet, to be baited by a rabble's curse." He chooses instead to fight Macduff to the death. Macduff kills and beheads Macbeth, and the play ends with Prince Malcolm becoming king.

The likely reason for Shakespeare's unflattering depiction of Macbeth is that King James VI and I was descended from Malcolm III via the House of Bruce and his own House of Stewart, whereas Macbeth's line died out with the death of Lulach six months after his step-father. King James was also thought to be a descendant of Banquo through Walter Stewart, 6th High Steward of Scotland. Historian Peter Berresford Ellis suggested that Shakespeare's inaccurate portrayal of MacBeth was unintentional, as he only had access to sources written from the point of view of the English and 'Anglicized Scotsmen', detached culturally and linguistically from 11th-century Scotland. Ellis thus proposed that "the degeneration of MacBeth of Scotland into a murdering usurper" preceded Shakespeare by "some 350 years after [MacBeth's] death at Lumphanan".

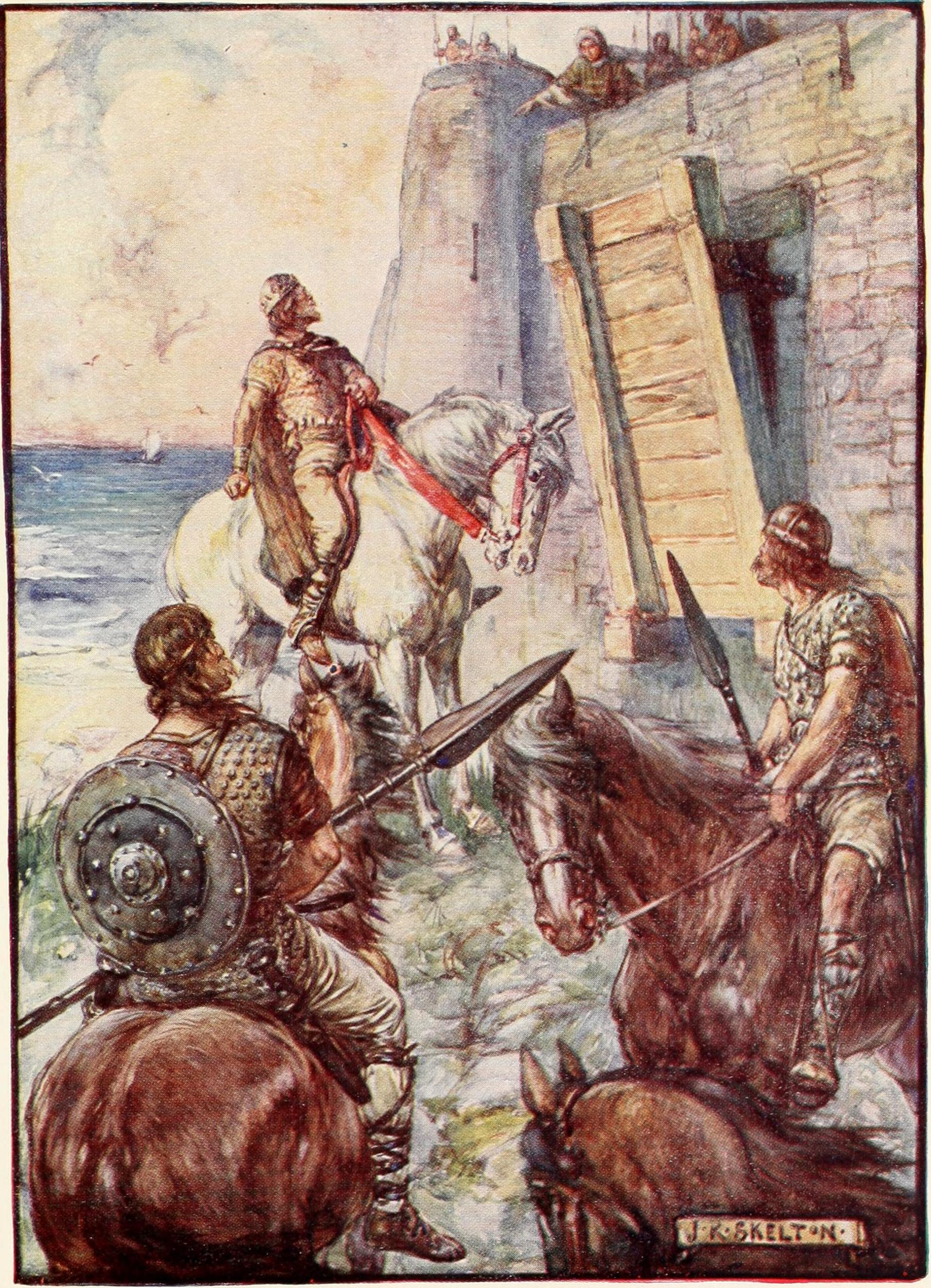
Macbeth at the fort of Macduff, by J. R. Skelton

In a 1959 essay, Boris Pasternak compared Shakespeare's characterisation of Macbeth to Raskolnikov, the protagonist of Crime and Punishment by Fyodor Dostoevsky. Pasternak explained that neither character begins as a murderer, but becomes one by a set of faulty rationalisations and a belief that he is above the law.

Lady Macbeth has also become famous in her own right. In his 1865 novel Lady Macbeth of the Mtsensk District, Nikolai Leskov updated The Tragedy of Macbeth so that it takes place among the Imperial Russian merchant class. In a twist on the source, however, Leskov reverses the gender roles: the woman is the murderer and the man is the instigator. Leskov's novel was the basis for Dmitri Shostakovich's 1936 opera of the same name.

== Sources ==
- The Annals of Ulster, AD 431–1201, CELT: Corpus of Electronic Texts, 2003
- The Annals of Tigernach, CELT: Corpus of Electronic Texts, 1996
- Gaelic notes from the Book of Deer (with translation), CELT: Corpus of Electronic Texts, 2001
- Anderson, Alan Orr (1922), Early Sources of Scottish History A.D. 500 to 1286, vol. I (1990 revised & corrected ed.), Stamford: Paul Watkins, ISBN 1-871615-03-8
- Anderson, Alan Orr (1908), Scottish Annals from English Chroniclers A.D. 500 to 1286, London: D. Nutt
- Anderson, M. O. (1980), Kings and Kingship in Early Scotland (2nd ed.), Edinburgh: Scottish Academic Press, ISBN 0-7011-1604-8
- Bannerman, John (1974), Studies in the History of Dalriada, Edinburgh: Scottish Academic Press, ISBN 0-7011-2040-1
- Barrell, Andrew D. M. (2000), Medieval Scotland, Cambridge: Cambridge University Press, ISBN 978-0-521-58602-3
- Barrow, G. W. S. (1989), Kingship and Unity: Scotland 1000–1306 (2nd ed.), Edinburgh: Edinburgh University Press, ISBN 0-7486-0104-X
- Broun, Dauvit (1999), The Irish Identity of the Kingdom of the Scots in the Twelfth and Thirteenth Centuries, Woodbridge: Boydell Press, ISBN 978-0-85115-375-9
- Cowan, Edward J. (1993), "The Historical MacBeth", in Sellar, W. D. H. (ed.), Moray: Province and People, Edinburgh: The Scottish Society for Northern Studies, pp. 117–142, ISBN 0-9505994-7-6
- Crawford, Barbara (1987), Scandinavian Scotland, Leicester: Leicester University Press, ISBN 0-7185-1282-0
- Driscoll, Stephen T. (2002), Alba: The Gaelic Kingdom of Scotland AD 800–1124, The Making of Scotland, Edinburgh: Birlinn, ISBN 978-1-84158-145-3
- Duncan, Archibald A. M. (1978), Scotland: The Making of the Kingdom (2nd ed.), Edinburgh: Mercat Press, ISBN 0-901824-83-6
- Duncan, Archibald A. M. (2002), The Kingship of the Scots 842–1292: Succession and Independence, Edinburgh: Edinburgh University Press, ISBN 978-0-7486-1626-8
- Ellis, Peter Berresford (1990), MacBeth, High King of Scotland, 1040–57, Belfast: Blackstaff Press, ISBN 0-85640-448-9
- Foster, Sally M. (2004), Picts, Gaels and Scots: Early Historic Scotland (2nd ed.), London: Batsford, ISBN 978-0-7134-8874-6
- Smyth, Alfred P. (1984), Warlords and Holy Men: Scotland AD 80–1000, Edinburgh: Edinburgh University Press, ISBN 0-7486-0100-7
- Swanton, Michael (1996), The Anglo-Saxon Chronicle, New York: Routledge, ISBN 0-415-92129-5
- Taylor, A. B. (1937), "Karl Hundason, 'King of Scots'" (PDF), Proceedings of the Society of Antiquaries of Scotland, LXXI: 334–340, doi:10.9750/PSAS.071.334.342, S2CID 257294925
- Woolf, Alex (2007), "The Cult of Moluag, the See of Mortlach and Church Organisation in Northern Scotland in the Eleventh and Twelfth Centuries", in Arbuthnot, Sharon J.; Hollo, Kaarina (eds.), Fil suil nglais – A Grey Eye Looks Back: A Festschrift for Colm O'Baoill (PDF), Brig o' Turk: Clann Tuirc, pp. 317–322, ISBN 978-0-9549733-7-7
- Woolf, Alex (2000), "The 'Moray Question' and the Kingship of Alba in the Tenth and Eleventh Centuries", The Scottish Historical Review, LXXIX (2), Edinburgh: Edinburgh University Press: 145–164, doi:10.3366/shr.2000.79.2.145, ISSN 1750-0222, S2CID 162334631
- Woolf, Alex (2007), From Pictland to Alba, 789–1070, The New Edinburgh History of Scotland, Edinburgh: Edinburgh University Press, ISBN 978-0-7486-1234-5

Macbeth, King of Scotland House of Moray Died: 15 August 1057
Regnal titles
| Preceded by Duncan I | King of Alba; 1040–1057 | Succeeded by Lulach |
| Preceded by Gille Coemgáin | Mormaer of Moray; 1032–1057 | Succeeded by Lulach |
