= List of monarchs in Britain by length of reign =

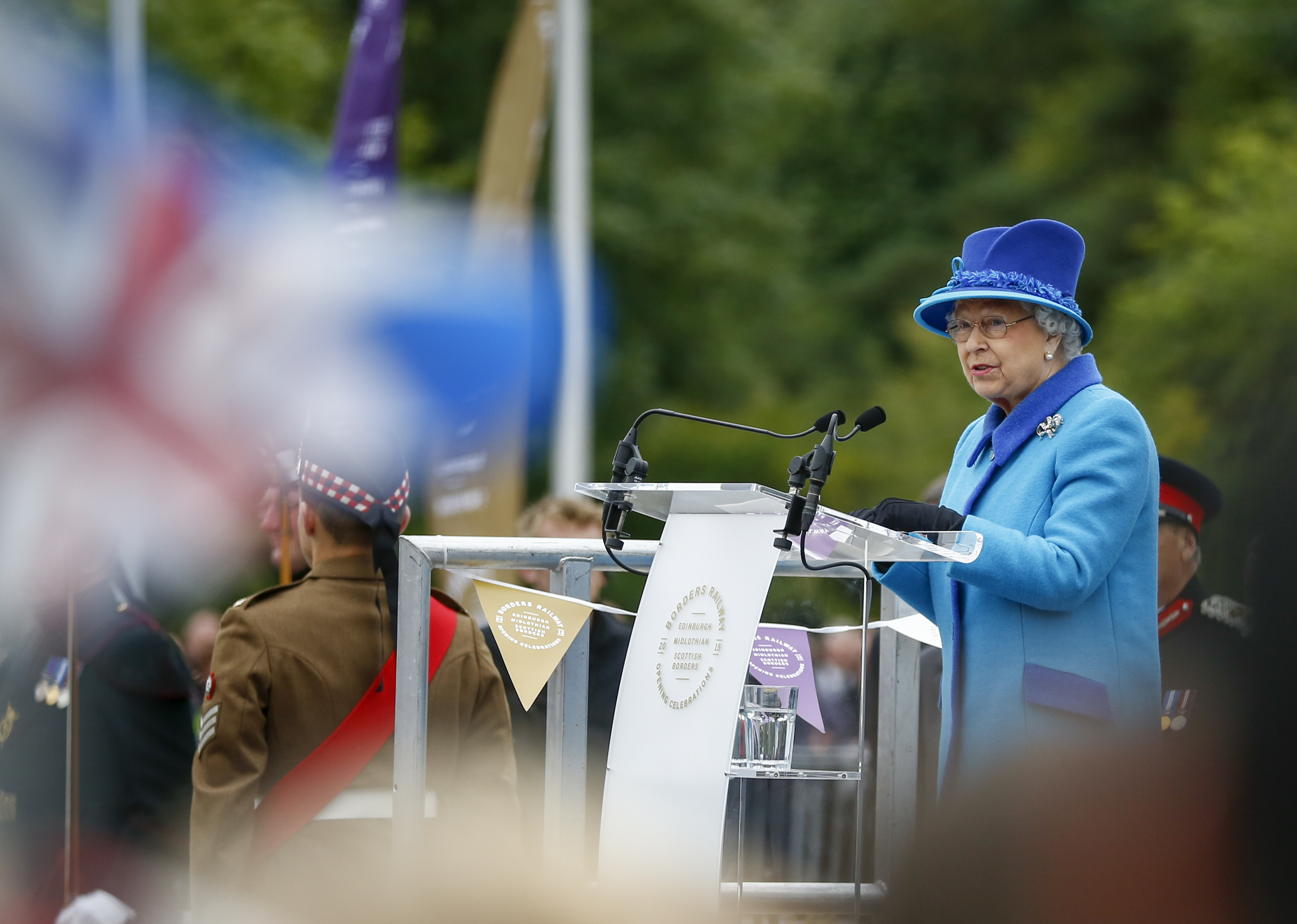
Elizabeth II delivering a speech at the official opening of the Borders Railway, on the day she became the longest-reigning British monarch.

The following is a list, ordered by length of reign, of the monarchs of the United Kingdom of Great Britain and Northern Ireland (1927–present), the United Kingdom of Great Britain and Ireland (1801–1922), the Kingdom of Great Britain (1707–1801), the Kingdom of England (871–1707), the Kingdom of Scotland (878–1707), the Kingdom of Ireland (1542–1800), and the Principality of Wales (1216–1542).

Queen Elizabeth II became the longest-reigning monarch in British history on 9 September 2015 when she surpassed the reign of her great-great-grandmother Queen Victoria. On 6 February 2017, she became the first British monarch to celebrate a Sapphire Jubilee, commemorating 65 years on the throne. On 6 February 2022, Elizabeth II became the first British monarch to reign for 70 years, and large-scale celebrations for her Platinum Jubilee occurred on 2 to 5 June. At her death aged 96 later that year, she had reigned for 70 years and 214 days.

== Ten longest-reigning British monarchs ==
These are the ten longest-reigning monarchs in the British Isles for whom there is reliable recorded evidence. This list excludes Constantine II of Scotland who ruled for approximately 43 years from c. 900 to 943.

Rank	Portrait	Monarch	Age at accession	Reign		Duration	
Rank	Portrait	Monarch	Age at accession	From	To	Days	Years, days
1		Elizabeth II	25 years, 291 days	6 February 1952	8 September 2022	25,782	70 years, 214 days
2		Victoria	18 years, 27 days	20 June 1837	22 January 1901	23,226	63 years, 216 days
3		George III	22 years, 143 days	25 October 1760	29 January 1820	21,644	59 years, 96 days
4		James VI of Scotland (Note: James VI, King of Scots, became James I, King of England, in 1603.)	1 year, 35 days	24 July 1567	27 March 1625	21,066	57 years, 246 days
5		Henry III	9 years, 27 days	28 October 1216	16 November 1272	20,473	56 years, 19 days
6		Edward III	14 years, 73 days	25 January 1327	20 June 1377	18,410	50 years, 147 days
7		William I of Scotland	c. 24 years	9 December 1165	4 December 1214	17,892	48 years, 360 days
8		Llywelyn of Gwynedd	c. 22 years	1195	11 April 1240	16,173–16,902	c. 44–46 years
9		Elizabeth I	25 years, 71 days	17 November 1558	24 March 1603	16,198	44 years, 127 days
10		David II of Scotland	5 years, 94 days	7 June 1329	22 February 1371	15,235	41 years, 260 days

== Complete list of the unitary monarchy ==
On 1 May 1707, under the Acts of Union 1707, the Kingdom of England united with the Kingdom of Scotland as the Kingdom of Great Britain. Then, on 1 January 1801, the Kingdom of Great Britain united with the Kingdom of Ireland to become the United Kingdom of Great Britain and Ireland, becoming the United Kingdom of Great Britain and Northern Ireland by Act of Parliament in 1927 following the creation of the Irish Free State in 1922.

Name	Reign		Duration	
Name	From	To	Years, days	Total days
Elizabeth II	6 February 1952	8 September 2022	70 years, 215 days	25,783
Victoria	20 June 1837	22 January 1901	63 years, 217 days	23,227
George III	25 October 1760	29 January 1820	59 years, 97 days	21,645
George II	22 June 1727^{N.S.}	25 October 1760	33 years, 126 days	12,180
George V	6 May 1910	20 January 1936	25 years, 260 days	9,391
George VI	11 December 1936	6 February 1952	15 years, 58 days	5,536
George I	1 August 1714	11 June 1727	12 years, 315 days	4,698
George IV	29 January 1820	26 June 1830	10 years, 149 days	3,802
Edward VII	22 January 1901	6 May 1910	9 years, 105 days	3,392
Anne	1 May 1707	1 August 1714	7 years, 93 days	2,650
William IV	26 June 1830	20 June 1837	6 years, 360 days	2,552
Charles III	8 September 2022	present	4 years, 57 days	1,518
Edward VIII	20 January 1936	11 December 1936	327 days	327

== Complete list of the kingdoms ==
=== England ===
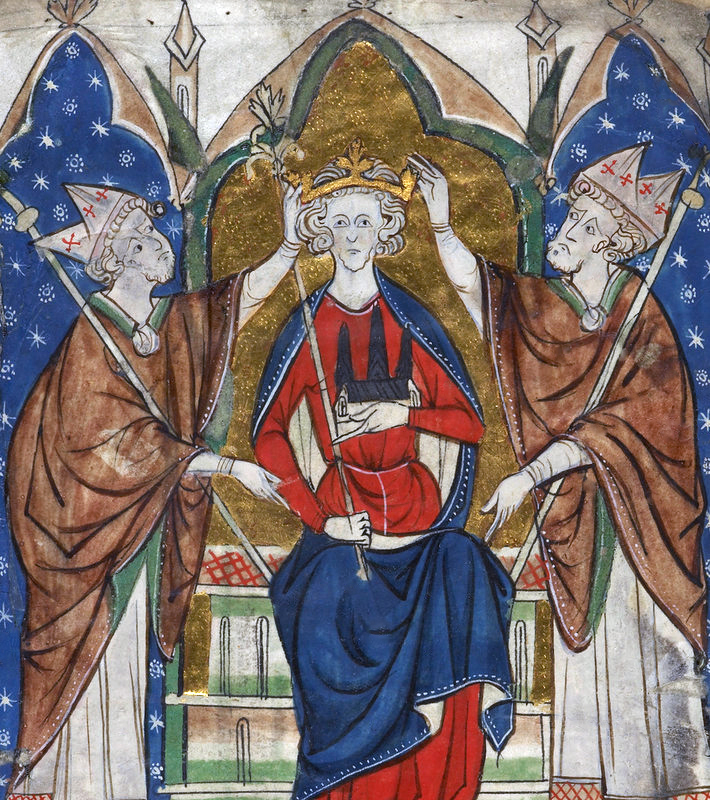
Henry III was the longest-reigning monarch of an independent England.

Includes English monarchs from the installation of Alfred the Great as King of Wessex in 871 to Anne (House of Stuart) and the Acts of Union on 1 May 1707, when the crown became part of the Kingdom of Great Britain.

Name	Reign		Duration	
Name	From	To	Days	Years, days
Henry III	28 October 1216	16 November 1272	20,473	56 years, 19 days
Edward III	25 January 1327	21 June 1377	18,410	50 years, 147 days
Elizabeth I	17 November 1558	24 March 1603	16,198	44 years, 127 days
Henry VI (Note: Monarch's total length of reign is the sum of the two reigns displayed.)	1 September 1422; 31 October 1470	4 March 1461; 11 April 1471	14,064; 162; Total: 14,226	38 years, 184 days 162 days Total: 38 years, 347 days
Æthelred II	18 March 978; 3 February 1014	25 December 1013; 23 April 1016	13,065; 810; Total: 13,875	35 years, 282 days 2 years, 80 days Total: 37 years, 362 days
Henry VIII	22 April 1509	28 January 1547	13,795	37 years, 281 days
Henry I	5 August 1100	1 December 1135	12,901	35 years, 118 days
Henry II	25 October 1154	6 July 1189	12,673	34 years, 254 days
Edward I	20 November 1272	7 July 1307	12,646	34 years, 229 days
Alfred the Great	24 April 871	26 October 899	10,412	28 years, 185 days
Edward the Elder	27 October 899	17 July 924	9,029	24 years, 264 days
Charles II (Note: Charles II King of England and King of Scots reigned concurrently from 29 May 1660 to 6 February 1685.)	29 May 1660	6 February 1685	9,019	24 years, 253 days
Charles I (Note: Charles I was King of England and King of Scots concurrently.)	27 March 1625	30 January 1649	8,710	23 years, 309 days
Henry VII	22 August 1485	21 April 1509	8,642	23 years, 242 days
Edward the Confessor	8 June 1042	5 January 1066	8,612	23 years, 211 days
Richard II	22 June 1377	29 September 1399	8,134	22 years, 99 days
James I	24 March 1603	27 March 1625	8,039	22 years, 3 days
Edward IV	4 March 1461; 11 April 1471	3 October 1470; 9 April 1483	3,500; 4,381; Total: 7,881	9 years, 213 days 11 years, 363 days Total: 21 years, 211 days
William I	12 December 1066	9 September 1087	7,563	20 years, 258 days
Edward II	8 July 1307	20 January 1327	7,136	19 years, 196 days
Cnut	30 November 1016	12 November 1035	6,921	18 years, 347 days
Stephen	22 December 1135	25 October 1154	6,883	18 years, 308 days
John	6 April 1199	19 October 1216	6,406	17 years, 196 days
Edgar I	1 October 959	8 July 975	5,759	15 years, 280 days
Æthelstan	2 August 924 (or 925)	27 October 939	5,564 or 5,199	15 years, 86 days or 14 years, 86 days
Henry IV	30 September 1399	20 March 1413	4,919	13 years, 171 days
William III (Note: William of Orange became William III, King of England, on 13 February 1689 and William II, King of Scots, on 11 May 1689.) (co-ruler with Mary II)	13 February 1689	8 March 1702	4,770	13 years, 23 days
Henry the Young King (junior king under Henry II)	14 June 1170	11 June 1183	4,745	12 years, 362 days
William II	26 September 1087	2 August 1100	4,693	12 years, 310 days
Richard I	6 July 1189	6 April 1199	3,561	9 years, 274 days
Eadred	26 May 946	23 November 955	3,468	9 years, 181 days
Henry V	21 March 1413	31 August 1422	3,450	9 years, 163 days
Edmund I	27 October 939	26 May 946	2,403	6 years, 211 days
Edward VI	28 January 1547	6 July 1553	2,351	6 years, 159 days
Mary II (Note: Mary II became Queen of England on 13 February 1689 and Queen of Scots on 11 May 1689.) (co-ruler with William III)	13 February 1689	28 December 1694	2,144	5 years, 318 days
Mary I	19 July 1553	17 November 1558	1,947	5 years, 121 days
Anne (Note: Anne, Queen of England and Scotland, became Queen of Great Britain on 1 May 1707.) (also Kingdom of Great Britain)	8 March 1702	30 April 1707	1,879	5 years, 53 days
Harold I	12 November 1035	17 March 1040	1,586	4 years, 126 days
Eadwig	23 November 955	1 October 959	1,408	3 years, 312 days
James II (Note: James was James II, King of England, and James VII, King of Scotland, concurrently.)	6 February 1685	11 December 1688	1,404	3 years, 309 days
Edward the Martyr	9 July 975	18 March 978	984	2 years, 253 days
Harthacnut	17 March 1040	8 June 1042	813	2 years, 83 days
Richard III	26 June 1483	22 August 1485	788	2 years, 57 days
Harold II	5 January 1066	14 October 1066	282	282 days
Edmund II	23 April 1016	30 November 1016	221	221 days
Matilda (disputed)	7 April 1141	1 November 1141	208	208 days
Edward V	9 April 1483	26 June 1483	78	78 days
Edgar II	15 October 1066	17 December 1066	63	63 days
Sweyn Forkbeard	25 December 1013	3 February 1014	40	40 days
Ælfweard (disputed)	17 July 924	2 August 924	16	16 days
Jane (disputed)	10 July 1553	19 July 1553	9	9 days

=== Scotland ===
Includes Scottish monarchs from the installation of Kenneth I (House of Alpin) in 848 to Anne (House of Stuart) and the Acts of Union on 1 May 1707, when the crown became part of the Kingdom of Great Britain.

Name	Reign		Duration	
Name	From	To	(days)	(years, days)
James VI	24 July 1567	27 March 1625	21,066	57 years, 246 days
William I	9 December 1165	4 December 1214	17,892	48 years, 360 days
Constantine II	900	943	c. 15,500	c. 43 years
David II	7 June 1329	22 February 1371	15,235	41 years, 260 days
Alexander III	6 July 1249	19 March 1286	13,405	36 years, 256 days
Malcolm III	17 March 1058	13 November 1093	13,025	35 years, 241 days
Alexander II	4 December 1214	6 July 1249	12,633	34 years, 214 days
James I	4 April 1406	21 February 1437	11,281	30 years, 323 days
Malcolm II	25 March 1005	25 November 1034	10,837	29 years, 245 days
James V	9 September 1513	14 December 1542	10,688	29 years, 96 days
David I	23 April 1124	24 May 1153	10,623	29 years, 31 days
James III	3 August 1460	11 June 1488	10,174	27 years, 313 days
Charles II	30 January 1649; 29 May 1660	3 September 1651; 6 February 1685	946; 9,019; Total: 9,965	2 years, 216 days 24 years, 253 days Total: 27 years, 104 days
James IV	11 June 1488	9 September 1513	9,220	25 years, 90 days
Mary I	14 December 1542	24 July 1567	8,988	24 years, 222 days
Charles I	27 March 1625	30 January 1649	8,710	23 years, 309 days
Kenneth II	971	995	c. 8,700	c. 23–24 years
James II	21 February 1437	3 August 1460	8,564	23 years, 164 days
Edward Balliol (disputed)	24 September 1332	20 January 1356	8,518	23 years, 118 days
Robert I	25 March 1306	7 June 1329	8,475	23 years, 74 days
Robert II	22 February 1371	19 April 1390	6,996	19 years, 56 days
Alexander I	8 January 1107	23 April 1124	6,315	17 years, 106 days
Macbeth	14 August 1040	15 August 1057	6,210	17 years, 1 day
Robert III	19 April 1390	4 April 1406	5,828	15 years, 350 days
Constantine I	862	877	c. 5,400	c. 15 years
Kenneth MacAlpin	843	13 February 858	c. 5,100	c. 14 years
William II	11 May 1689	8 March 1702	4,683	12 years, 301 days
Malcolm IV	24 May 1153	9 December 1165	4,582	12 years, 199 days
Giric (co-ruler with Eochaid?)	878	889	c. 4.000	c. 11 years
Donald II	889	900	c. 4,000	c. 11 years
Malcolm I	943	954	c. 3,600	c. 10–11 years
Edgar	1097	8 January 1107	c. 3,600	c. 10 years
Kenneth III	997	25 March 1005	c. 2,900	c. 8 years
Indulf	954	962	c. 2,700	c. 8 years
Duncan I	25 November 1034	14 August 1040	2,089	5 years, 263 days
Mary II	11 April 1689	28 December 1694	2,087	5 years, 261 days
Amlaíb	971	977	c. 2,000	c. 5–6 years
Anne	8 March 1702	30 April 1707	1,879	5 years, 53 days
Dub	962	c. 966-967	c. 1,800	c. 5 years
Cuilén	c. 966-967	971	c. 1,800	c. 5 years
Domnall mac Ailpín	858	13 April 862	c. 1.300	c. 4 years
James VII	6 February 1685	11 December 1688 (claimed until 16 September 1701)	1,404 (claimed 6,065)	3 years, 309 days claimed 16 years, 222 days
Margaret	25 November 1286	26 September 1290	1,401	3 years, 305 days
John Balliol	17 November 1292	10 July 1296	1,331	3 years, 236 days
Donald III	13 November 1093	1097	c. 1,000	c. 3–4 years
Áed mac Cináeda	877	878	c. 365	c. 1 year
Constantine III	995	997	c. 485	16 months
Lulach	15 August 1057	17 March 1058	212	212 days
Duncan II	May 1094	12 November 1094	c. 195	"less than 7 months"

== List of the Principalities ==
=== Gwynedd (incomplete list) ===
A map of Wales in 1267, demonstrating Gwynedd's position in the area of Snowdonia.

The Principality (or Kingdom) of Gwynedd (5th century–1216), located in northwest Wales, was one of the most prominent early medieval Welsh kingdoms. Its rulers were often acclaimed as "King of the Britons," symbolizing their influence over other Welsh territories and their resistance to external threats. Gwynedd faced repeated challenges, including civil wars, Saxon incursions, and Norman invasions, which gradually eroded its dominance. In 1216, it transitioned into the Principality of Wales, although the title "Prince of Wales" was not formally adopted until the 1240s under the leadership of Llywelyn ap Gruffudd, also known as Llywelyn the Last.

Gwynedd’s heartland was the mountainous and hilly region of Snowdonia, which provided natural defenses and contributed to its resilience against invaders. The kingdom played a central role in preserving Welsh identity, language, and culture during a period of significant cultural and social upheaval in Britain.

Gwynedd’s political and military structure helped shape the foundations of later Welsh governance. Its rulers, particularly under the House of Aberffraw, established enduring principles of leadership and unity that influenced medieval Welsh law and identity. As historian R. R. Davies notes in The Age of Conquest: Wales 1063–1415, Gwynedd stood as “the nucleus of Welsh political life,” embodying both resistance and renewal amid centuries of external pressure.

Name	Reign		Duration	
Name	From	To	(days)	(years, days)
Gruffudd ap Cynan	1081	1137		c. 55–56 years
Llywelyn the Great	1195	11 April 1240	> 16,172	c. 44–45 years
Owain Gwynedd	1137	1170	> 11,688	c. 33 years
Dafydd ab Owain Gwynedd	1170	1195	> 8,766	c. 25 years
Cynan ab Iago	1023	1039	5,840	16 years
Hywel ab Owain Gwynedd	1170	1170		< 1 year

=== Wales ===
The Principality of Wales (1216–1542) was a client state of England for much of its history, except for brief periods when it was de facto independent under a Welsh Prince of Wales (see House of Aberffraw). From 1301 it was first used as a title of the English (and later British) heir apparent. The Laws in Wales Acts 1535 and 1542 formally incorporated all of Wales within the Kingdom of England.

Name	Reign		Duration	
Name	From	To	(days)	(years, days)
Llywelyn ab Iorwerth	1195	1240	> 16,436	c. 45 years
Dafydd ap Llywelyn	1240	1246	> 2190	c. 6 years
Llywelyn ap Gruffudd	1253	11 December 1282	> 10,572	c. 29 years
Dafydd ap Gruffudd	1282	1283	> 365	c. 1 year
Owain Glyndŵr (disputed)	16 September 1400	c. 1416	> 5,585	c. 16 years
Owain Goch ap Gruffydd	25 February 1246	1255	> 3,000	c. 9 years
Owain Lawgoch (disputed)	May 1372	July 1378	> 2,221	c. 6 years
Dafydd ap Llywelyn	12 April 1240	25 February 1246	2,145	5 years, 319 days
Dafydd ap Gruffydd	11 December 1282	3 October 1283	296	296 days

== See also ==
- Family tree of the British royal family
- List of British monarchs
- List of British monarchy records
- List of longest-reigning monarchs
- Monarchy of the United Kingdom

== Notes ==
Additional
^N.S.Over the course of George II's life, two calendars were used: the Old Style Julian calendar (O.S.) and the New Style Gregorian calendar (N.S.). Before 1700, the two calendars were 10 days apart. Hanover switched from the Julian to the Gregorian calendar on 19 February/1 March 1700. Great Britain switched on 3/14 September 1752.
