= Amlaíb, King of Scotland =

King of Alba from 971 to 977

Amlaíb mac Illuilb

King of Alba (Scotland)
- Reign: 971/976–977
- Predecessor: Cuilén or Kenneth II
- Successor: Kenneth II
- Died: 977
- House: Alpin
- Father: Illulb mac Custantín

Amlaíb mac Illuilb (Middle Irish: [ˈaβ̃lɤːβʲ]; died 977) was a tenth century King of Alba. (Note: Since the 1990s, academics have accorded Amlaíb various patronymic names in English secondary sources: Amblaib mac Idulb, Amblaih mac Idulb, Amlaíb mac Iduilb, Amlaíb mac Illuilb, and Óláfr mac Castantín. Likewise since the 1990s, academics have accorded Amlaíb various personal names in English secondary sources: Amalgaid, Amblaih, Amlaíb, Anlaf, Olaf, Óláfr, and Ólafr.) He was one of three sons of Illulb mac Custantín, King of Alba, and a member of Clann Áeda meic Cináeda, a branch of the Alpínid dynasty. Amlaíb's paternal grandfather possessed strong connections with the Scandinavian dynasty of Dublin, and there is evidence to suggest that Illulb and Amlaíb bore names of Old Norse origin. If Amlaíb's name indeed represents a Gaelicised Scandinavian name, it could indicate that his mother was a member of the Uí Ímair, and possibly a granddaughter of Amlaíb Cúarán or Amlaíb mac Gofraid.

Following Illulb's death in 962, the kingship of Alba was taken up by Dub mac Maíl Coluim, a member of Clann Custantín meic Cináeda, a rival branch of the Alpínid dynasty. This king soon faced opposition from Amlaíb's brother, Cuilén, before the latter secured the kingship for himself in 966. Cuilén and another son of Illulb were slain in 971, after which the kingship was taken up by Dub's brother, Cináed mac Maíl Choluim. According to Irish sources, the latter slew Amlaíb in 977. The fact that these sources style Amlaíb as a king, and fail to accord a royal title to Cináed, suggests that Amlaíb was successful in seizing the kingship from his rival. Amlaíb's short reign appears to date to 971/976–977.

== Parentage and personal names ==
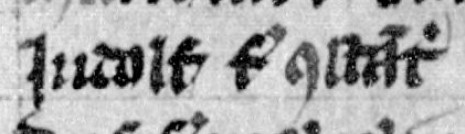
The name of Illulb mac Custantín as it appears on 29v of Paris Bibliothèque Nationale MS Latin 4126 (the Poppleton manuscript): "Indolf filius Constantini".

Amlaíb was one of three sons of Illulb mac Custantín, King of Alba (died 962). Amlaíb's paternal grandfather was Custantín mac Áeda, King of Alba (died 952), a man who possessed strong connections with the Scandinavian dynasty of Dublin. There is evidence to suggest that some of Custantín's descendants bore Scandinavian names. For instance, Illulb's name could be a Gaelicised form of the Old English personal name Eadwulf, or else a Gaelicised form of the Old Norse personal name Hildulfr.

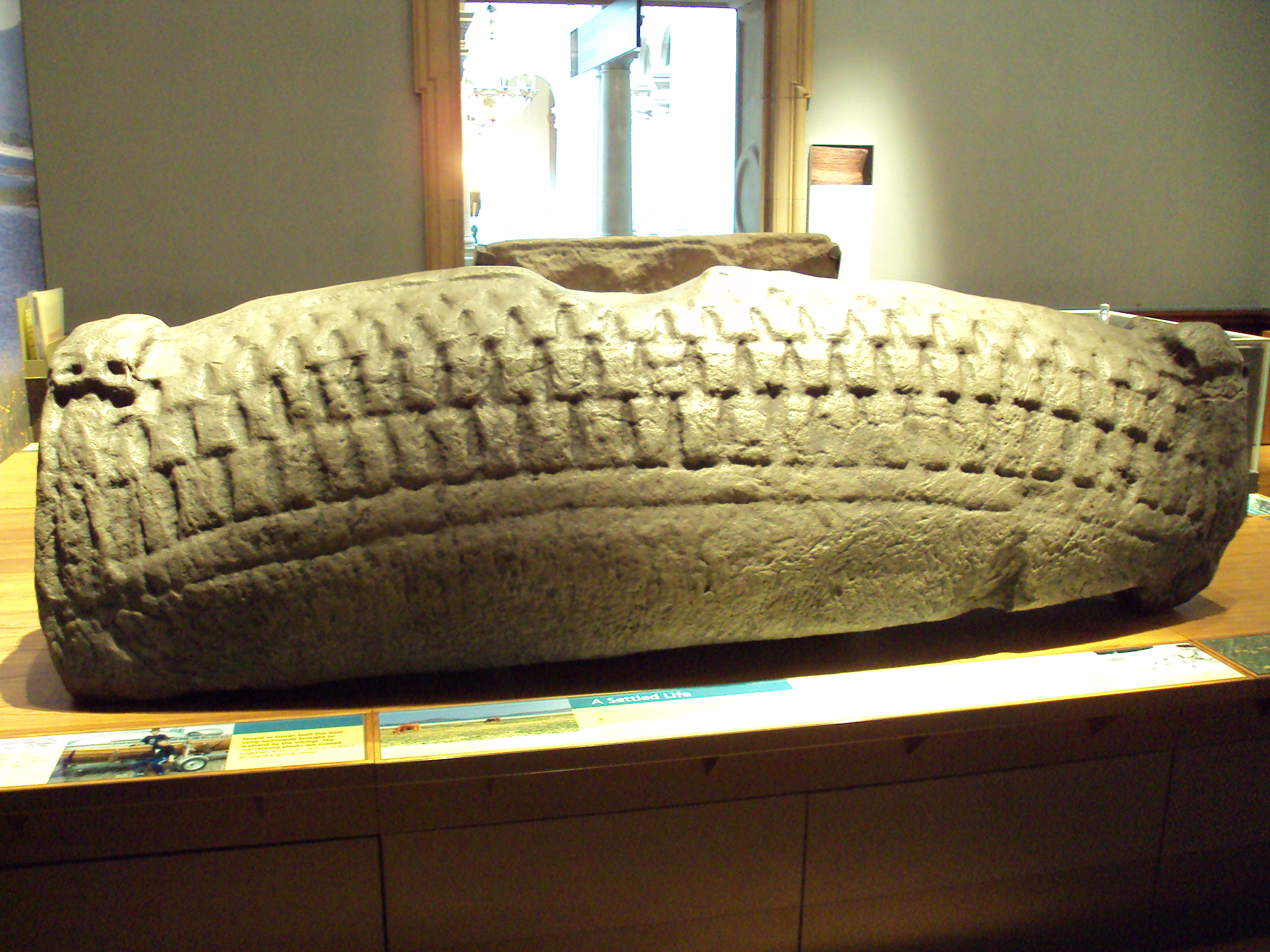
Photograph of a hogback grave slab on display in Glasgow. Such stones may be indicative of Scandinavian settlement in Perthshire and Fife. The evidence of Scandinavian influence upon Amlaíb's immediate family could indicate that his kindred was involved with such immigration.

Evidence of Scandinavian influence on the Scottish court may be a possible epithet accorded to Amlaíb's brother, Cuilén (died 971), by the ninth–twelfth century Chronicle of the Kings of Alba. In one instance, this source records Cuilén's name as "Culenrīg". The bar above the letter "i" in this word appears to indicate that rīg should be expanded to "ring". Whilst it is possible that this word represents the Old Norse hringr, meaning "ring" or "ring-giver", the name may be corrupted from a scribal error, and the word itself might refer to something else.

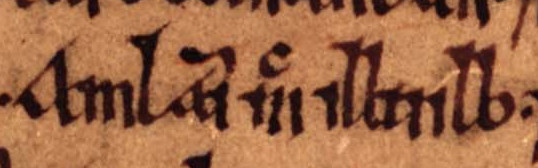
Amlaíb's name as it appears on 15r of Oxford Bodleian Library MS Rawlinson B 488 (the Annals of Tigernach): "Amlaim mac Illuilb".

Other possible evidence of Scandinavian influence upon Custantín's family may be Amlaíb's own name. Although his name may represent a "modernised" form of the Gaelic personal name Amalgaid, a name often confused with Amlaíb in mediaeval sources, the latter name usually represents a Gaelicised form of the Old Norse personal name Óláfr. In fact, Amlaíb's name could indicate that his mother was a member of a Scandinavian kindred – perhaps the Uí Ímair – and conceivably a descendant of Amlaíb Cúarán (died 980/981) or Amlaíb mac Gofraid (died 941). (Note: Likewise, if Illulb's own name is indeed of Old Norse origin, then it could indicate that this man's mother was similarly a member of a Scandinavian kindred, like the Uí Ímair.) Certainly, members of Gaelic dynasties were accorded Scandinavian names by the end of the century, just as members of insular Scandinavian dynasties began to bear Gaelic names. If Amlaíb's name is indeed Scandinavian in origin, he would be one of the first figures to bear such a cross-ethnic personal name.

== Kin-strife amongst the Alpínids ==
Simplified pedigree of two branches of the Alpínid dynasty: Clann Custantín meic Cináeda (highlighted green) and Clann Áeda meic Cináeda (highlighted yellow).

Cináed mac Ailpín (died 858)
Custantín mac Cináeda (died 876) | Áed mac Cináeda (died 878)
Domnall mac Causantín (died 900) | Custantín mac Áeda (died 952)
Máel Coluim mac Domnaill (died 954) | Illulb mac Custantín (died 962)
Dub mac Maíl Choluim (died 966/967) | Cináed mac Maíl Choluim (died 995) | Cuilén mac Illuilb (died 971) | Amlaíb mac Illuilb (died 977)
Máel Coluim mac Cináeda (died 1034) | Custantín mac Cuiléin (died 997)

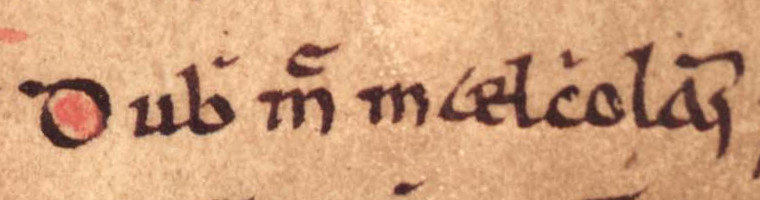
The name of Cuilén's rival kinsman, Dub mac Maíl Choluim, as it appears on folio 32v of Oxford Bodleian Library MS Rawlinson B 489.

Amlaíb and his immediate family were members of the ruling Alpínid dynasty, the patrilineal descendants of Cináed mac Ailpín, King of the Picts (died 858). The root of this kindred's remarkable early success laid in its ability to successfully rotate the royal succession amongst its members. For example, Illulb's father – a member of the Clann Áeda meic Cináeda branch of the dynasty – succeeded Domnall mac Causantín (died 900) – a member of the Clann Custantín meic Cináeda branch – and following a remarkable reign of forty years resigned the kingship to this man's son, Máel Coluim mac Domnaill (died 954). (Note: This alternating succession was similar to that practiced in Ireland by the Cenél nEógain and Clann Cholmáin branches of the Uí Néill in regards to the latter kindred's monopolisation of the kingship of Tara between the eighth and tenth centuries. The aforesaid two branches of the Alpínid dynasty are not attested by contemporary records but rather deduced as a result of the succession.) Amlaíb's father succeeded to the kingship following Máel Coluim's demise, and ruled as king until his death in 962. The record of Illulb's fall at the hands of an invading Scandinavian host is the last time Irish and Scottish sources note Viking encroachment into the kingdom. The Scandinavian Kingdom of York had collapsed by the 950s, and the warbands of the kings of Dublin seem to have ceased their overseas adventures during this period as well. Unlike English monarchs who had to endure Viking depredations from the 980s to the 1010s, the kings of Alba were left in relative peace from about the time of Illulb's fall. Free from such outside threats, however, the Alpínids seem to have struggled amongst themselves.

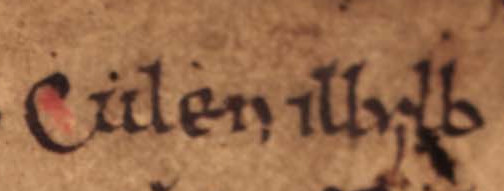
The name of Cuilén mac Illuilb as it appears on folio 33r of Oxford Bodleian Library MS Rawlinson B 489.

There is some uncertainty regarding the succession after Illulb's demise. On one hand, he may well have been succeeded by Máel Coluim's son, Dub (died 966–967). On the other hand, there is reason to suspect that the kingship was temporarily shared by Dub and Cuilén and that neither man had been strong enough to displace the other in the immediate aftermath of Illulb's passing. Although the Alpínid branches represented by Illulb and Dub seem to have maintained peace throughout Illulb's reign, inter-dynastic conflict clearly erupted in the years that followed. Dub appears to have spent much of his reign contending with Cuilén, Certainly, the two battled each other in 965. Dub was expelled from the kingship in the following year and is recorded to have been slain in 966/967. Cuilén's undisputed reign seems to have spanned from 966 to 971. As far as surviving sources record, Cuilén's reign appears to have been relatively uneventful. His death in 971 is noted by several sources. According to the Chronicle of the Kings of Alba, Cuilén and his brother, Eochaid (died 971), were killed by Britons. There is reason to suspect that Cuilén's killer, a certain Rhydderch ap Dyfnwal (fl. 971), was a son of Dyfnwal ab Owain, King of Strathclyde (died 975).

== Reign and death ==
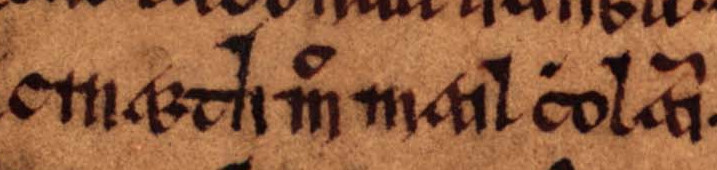
The name of Cuilén's apparent successor, Cináed mac Maíl Choluim, as it appears on folio 15r of Oxford Bodleian Library MS Rawlinson B 488: "Cinaeth mac Mail Cholaim".

Although the Chronicle of the Kings of Alba reports that Dub's brother, Cináed mac Maíl Choluim (died 995), was the next King of Alba, Irish sources – such as royal genealogies, the fourteenth century Annals of Tigernach and the fifteenth–sixteenth century Annals of Ulster – appear to reveal that Amlaíb possessed the kingship before his death at Cináed's hands. Whilst Cináed may well have initially succeeded to the kingship, it seems that Amlaíb was able to mount a successful – if only temporary – bid for the throne. Certainly, the aforesaid annal-entries style Amlaíb a king and accord Cináed a mere patronymic name. (Note: The Annals of Ulster misidentifies Cináed's father as Domnall.) Although there is no specific evidence that Amlaíb and Cináed had constantly fought after Cuilén's demise, the Chronicle of the Kings of Alba ends its account at about 973, and the twelfth century The Prophecy of Berchán – an important source for the hostilities between Dub and Cuilén – suffers from a lacuna in its account of Cináed's reign. One possibility is that the kingship had been shared between Amlaíb and Cináed until the former's elimination.

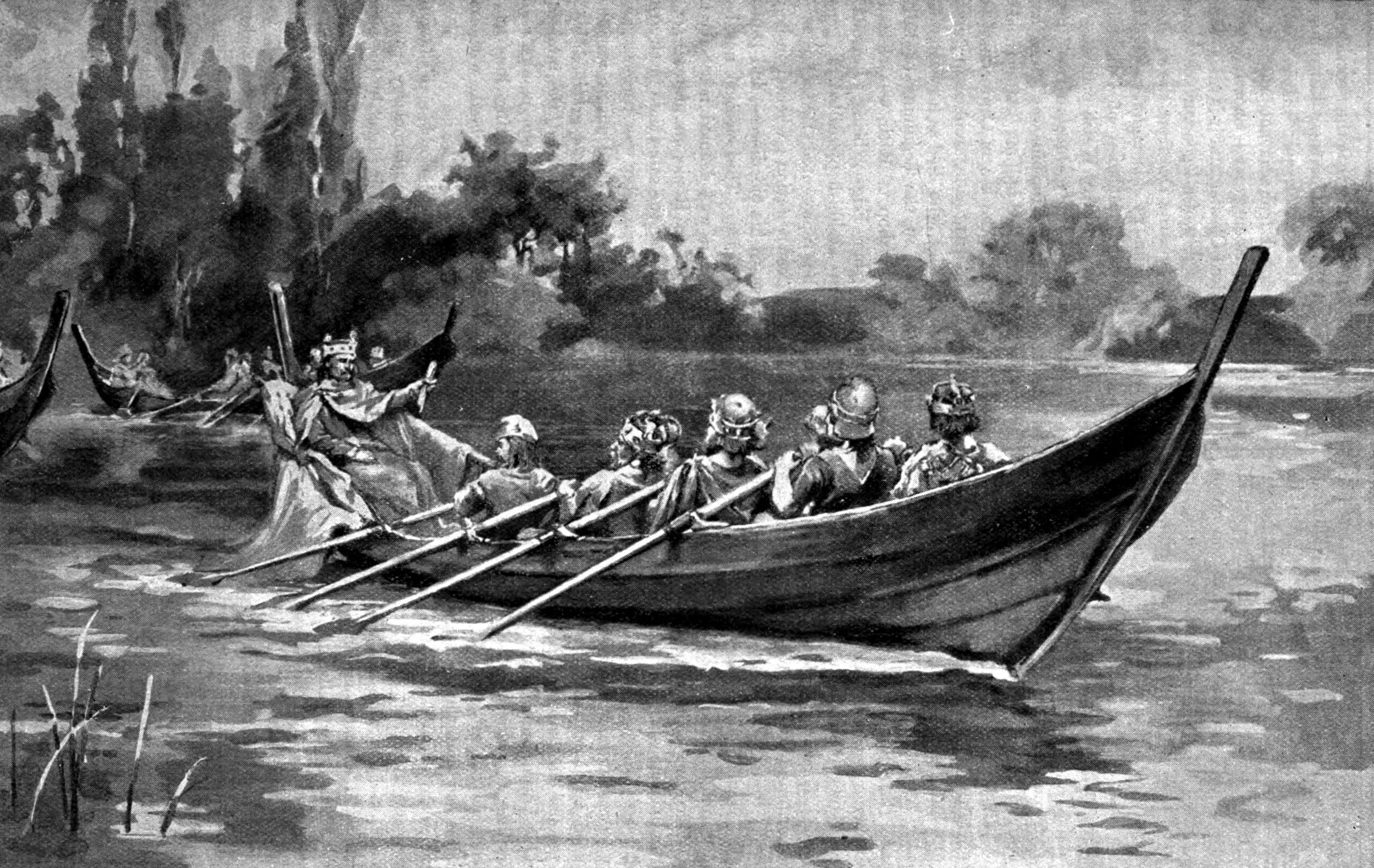
An illustration of early twentieth century depiction of Edgar, King of the English being rowed down the River Dee by eight kings. According to the Anglo-Saxon Chronicle, Edgar met six kings at Chester. By the twelfth century, chroniclers alleged that eight kings rowed Edgar down the river in an act of submission. The assembly itself took place in 975, when Amlaíb may have reigned as king.

Amlaíb's reign is not attested by any Scottish king-list, and it would appear that his regime was indeed brief, perhaps dating from 971/976–977. In the midst of this interval, the ninth–twelfth century Anglo-Saxon Chronicle reveals that Edgar, King of the English (died 975) assembled a massive naval force and met with six kings at Chester in 975. Although later sources corroborate the event, the reliability of the names accorded to the assembled kings is less certain. Two of the named kings appear to be the aforesaid Dyfnwal and Cináed. Considering the fact that the Anglo-Saxon Chronicle numbers the kings at six, if Cináed was indeed present, it is unlikely that Amlaíb was in attendance as well. Although the chronology concerning the reigns of Cináed and Amlaíb is uncertain – with Cináed's reign perhaps dating from 971/977-995 – the part played by the particular King of Alba at the assembly could well have concerned the frontier of his realm. One of the other named kings seems to have been Maccus mac Arailt (fl. 974), whilst another could have been this man's brother, Gofraid (died 989). These two Islesmen may have been regarded as threats by the Scots and Cumbrians. Maccus and Gofraid are recorded to have devastated Anglesey at the beginning of the decade, which could indicate that Edgar's assembly was undertaken as a means to counter the menace posed by these energetic siblings. In fact, there is evidence to suggest that, as a consequence of the assembly at Chester, the brothers may have turned their attention from the British mainland westwards towards Ireland, and that Gofraid ceased his operations in Wales until the next decade. Whatever the case, within two years both Dyfnwal and Edgar were dead. Contemporary English sources described the period after Edgar's demise as a time of "dissension", "trouble", "sedition", and "most unhappy times". In fact, the upheaval caused by the deaths of these men may well have contributed to Cináed's elimination of Amlaíb.

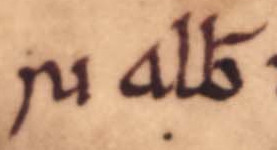
Amlaíb's title as it appears on folio 33v of Oxford Bodleian Library MS Rawlinson B 489. (Note: Amlaíb's patrilineal ancestor Áed mac Cináeda – eponym of Clann Áed meic Cináeda – is the last king to be accorded the Latin title rex Pictorum ("king of the Picts"). Scottish kings were afterwards styled in Gaelic rí Alban ("king of Alba").)

According to the twelfth-century De primo Saxonum adventu, at some point Edgar granted Lothian to Cináed in return for his recognition of English overlordship. If correct, one possibility is that the transaction dates to the 960s/970s, and was intended to assist Cináed's opposition against Amlaíb. The revolving succession within the Alpínid dynasty reveals that the inter-dynastic struggle between Cuilén and Dub was continued by their respective brothers. As for Cuilén's other brother, Eochaid, this man's death with Cuilén seems to be evidence of his prominent position within the kingdom. The fact that Amlaíb reigned after his brother's death likewise appears to indicate that he too played an important part in Cuilén's regime. One of Cináed's first acts as king was evidently an invasion of the kingdom of the Cumbrians. Although this campaign may well have been a retaliatory response to Cuilén's killing, it may be more likely that Cináed carried out this enterprise in the context of crushing a British affront to Scottish authority rather than as a means of avenging the death of his kinsman. In any event, Cináed's invasion ended in defeat, a fact which coupled with Cuilén's killing reveals that the Kingdom of Strathclyde was indeed a power to be reckoned with.

== Sources ==
- Anderson, A. O., ed. (1908). Scottish Annals From English Chroniclers, A.D. 500–1286. London: David Nutt – via Internet Archive.
- Anderson, A. O., ed. (1922). Early Sources of Scottish History, A.D. 500–1286. Vol. 1. London: Oliver and Boyd – via Internet Archive.
- "Annals of Tigernach". Corpus of Electronic Texts (13 April 2005 ed.). University College Cork. 2005.
- Arnold, T., ed. (1885). Symeonis Monachi Opera Omnia. Rerum Britannicarum Medii Ævi Scriptores. Vol. 2. London: Longmans & Co – via Google Books.
- Birch, W. D. G. (1893). Cartularium Saxonicum. Vol. 3. London: Charles J. Clark – via Google Books.
- "Bodleian Library MS. Rawl. B. 488". Early Manuscripts at Oxford University. Oxford Digital Library. n.d.
- "Bodleian Library MS. Rawl. B. 489". Early Manuscripts at Oxford University. Oxford Digital Library. n.d.
- "Book of Leinster, Formerly Lebar na Núachongbála". Corpus of Electronic Texts (8 May 2015 ed.). University College Cork. 2015.
- Gough-Cooper, H. W., ed. (2015). Annales Cambriae: The B Text From London, National Archives, MS E164/1, pp. 2–26 (PDF) (September 2015 ed.) – via Welsh Chronicles Research Group.
- Howlett, D. (2000). Caledonian Craftmanship: The Scottish Latin Tradition. Dublin: Four Courts Press. ISBN 1-85182-455-3.
- Hudson, B. T. (1996). "Prophecy of Berchán: Irish and Scottish High-Kings of the Early Middle Ages". Contributions to the Study of World History. Contributions to the Study of World History (series vol. 54). Westport, CT: Greenwood Press. ISBN 978-0-313-29567-6. ISSN 0885-9159.
- Hudson, B. T. (1998b). "The Scottish Chronicle". Scottish Historical Review. 77 (2): 129–161. doi:10.3366/shr.1998.77.2.129. eISSN 1750-0222. ISSN 0036-9241. JSTOR 25530832.
- Lat. 4126. n.d. – via Gallica.
- Raine, J., ed. (1879). The Historians of the Church of York and its Archbishops. Vol. 1. London: Longman & Co. – via Internet Archive.
- Skene, W. F., ed. (1867). Chronicles of the Picts, Chronicles of the Scots, and Other Early Memorials of Scottish History. Edinburgh: H.M. General Register House – via Internet Archive.
- "The Annals of Tigernach". Corpus of Electronic Texts (2 November 2010 ed.). University College Cork. 2010.
- "The Annals of Ulster". Corpus of Electronic Texts (29 August 2008 ed.). University College Cork. 2008.
- "The Annals of Ulster". Corpus of Electronic Texts (15 August 2012 ed.). University College Cork. 2012.
- Thorpe, B., ed. (1861). The Anglo-Saxon Chronicle. Rerum Britannicarum Medii Ævi Scriptores. Vol. 1. London: Longman, Green, Longman, and Roberts – via Internet Archive.
- Whitelock, D., ed. (1996) [1955]. English Historical Documents, c. 500–1042 (2nd ed.). London: Routledge. ISBN 978-0-203-43950-0.
- Williams Ab Ithel, J., ed. (1860). Brut y Tywysigion; or, The Chronicle of the Princes. Rerum Britannicarum Medii Ævi Scriptores. London: Longman, Green, Longman, and Roberts – via Internet Archive.
- Broun, D. (2001). "Kingship: 2. 900–1100". In Lynch, M. (ed.). The Oxford Companion to Scottish History. Oxford Companions. Oxford: Oxford University Press. pp. 360–361. ISBN 978-0-19-211696-3.
- Broun, D. (2004a). "Constantine II [Causantín mac Aeda] (d. 952)". Oxford Dictionary of National Biography (online ed.). Oxford University Press. doi:10.1093/ref:odnb/6115. (Subscription, Wikipedia Library access or UK public library membership required.)
- Broun, D. (2004b). "Culen [Cuilén mac Illuilb, Cuilén Hringr] (d. 971)". Oxford Dictionary of National Biography (online ed.). Oxford University Press. doi:10.1093/ref:odnb/6870. (Subscription, Wikipedia Library access or UK public library membership required.)
- Broun, D. (2004c). "Dubh [Duff] [Dub mac Mael Coluim] (d. 966)". Oxford Dictionary of National Biography. Vol. 1 (online ed.). Oxford University Press. doi:10.1093/ref:odnb/8166. (Subscription, Wikipedia Library access or UK public library membership required.)
- Broun, D. (2004d). "Indulf [Illulb mac Causantín] (bap. 927?, d. 962)". Oxford Dictionary of National Biography. Vol. 1 (online ed.). Oxford University Press. doi:10.1093/ref:odnb/14379. (Subscription, Wikipedia Library access or UK public library membership required.)
- Broun, D. (2004e). "Kenneth II (d. 995)". Oxford Dictionary of National Biography. Vol. 1 (online ed.). Oxford University Press. doi:10.1093/ref:odnb/15399. (Subscription, Wikipedia Library access or UK public library membership required.)
- Broun, D. (2004f). "The Welsh Identity of the Kingdom of Strathclyde c. 900–1200". The Innes Review. 55 (2): 111–180. doi:10.3366/inr.2004.55.2.111. eISSN 1745-5219. ISSN 0020-157X.
- Broun, D. (2007). Scottish Independence and the Idea of Britain: From the Picts to Alexander III. Edinburgh: Edinburgh University Press. ISBN 978-0-7486-2360-0.
- Broun, D. (2015a). "Britain and the Beginning of Scotland". Journal of the British Academy. 3: 107–137. doi:10.5871/jba/003.107.
- Broun, D. (2015b) [1997]. "Cuilén". In Crowcroft, R.; Cannon, J. (eds.). The Oxford Companion to British History (2nd ed.). Oxford University Press. doi:10.1093/acref/9780199677832.001.0001. ISBN 978-0-19-967783-2 – via Oxford Reference.
- Cassell's History of England: From the Roman Invasion to the Wars of the Roses. Vol. 1. London: Cassell and Company. 1909 – via Internet Archive.
- Broun, D. (2015c) [1997]. "Dub". In Crowcroft, R.; Cannon, J. (eds.). The Oxford Companion to British History (2nd ed.). Oxford University Press. doi:10.1093/acref/9780199677832.001.0001. ISBN 978-0-19-967783-2 – via Oxford Reference.
- Broun, D. (2015d) [1997]. "Indulf". In Crowcroft, R.; Cannon, J. (eds.). The Oxford Companion to British History (2nd ed.). Oxford University Press. doi:10.1093/acref/9780199677832.001.0001. ISBN 978-0-19-967783-2 – via Oxford Reference.
- Broun, D. (2015e) [1997]. "Kenneth II". In Crowcroft, R.; Cannon, J. (eds.). The Oxford Companion to British History (2nd ed.). Oxford University Press. doi:10.1093/acref/9780199677832.001.0001. ISBN 978-0-19-967783-2 – via Oxford Reference.
- Busse, P. E. (2006a). "Cinaed mac Mael Choluim". In Koch, J. T. (ed.). Celtic Culture: A Historical Encyclopedia. Vol. 2. Santa Barbara, CA: ABC-CLIO. p. 439. ISBN 978-1-85109-445-5.
- Busse, P. E. (2006b). "Cuilén Ring mac Illuilb". In Koch, J. T. (ed.). Celtic Culture: A Historical Encyclopedia. Vol. 2. Santa Barbara, CA: ABC-CLIO. p. 509. ISBN 978-1-85109-445-5.
- Busse, P. E. (2006c). "Dyfnwal ab Owain/Domnall mac Eogain". In Koch, J. T. (ed.). Celtic Culture: A Historical Encyclopedia. Vol. 2. Santa Barbara, CA: ABC-CLIO. p. 639. ISBN 978-1-85109-445-5.
- Charles-Edwards, T. M. (2008). "Picts and Scots". The Innes Review. 59 (2): 168–188. doi:10.3366/E0020157X08000279. eISSN 1745-5219. ISSN 0020-157X. S2CID 161703435.
- Clancy, T. (2016). "Logie: An Ecclesiastical Place-Name Element in Eastern Scotland" (PDF). The Journal of Scottish Name Studies. 10: 25–88. ISSN 2054-9385.
- Clancy, T. O. (2006). "Cusantín mac Aeda (Constantine II)". In Koch, J. T. (ed.). Celtic Culture: A Historical Encyclopedia. Vol. 2. Santa Barbara, CA: ABC-CLIO. pp. 522–523. ISBN 978-1-85109-445-5.
- Clarkson, T. (2010). The Men of the North: The Britons and Southern Scotland (EPUB). Edinburgh: John Donald. ISBN 978-1-907909-02-3.
- Clarkson, T. (2012) [2011]. The Makers of Scotland: Picts, Romans, Gaels and Vikings (EPUB). Edinburgh: Birlinn Limited. ISBN 978-1-907909-01-6.
- Clarkson, T. (2014). Strathclyde and the Anglo-Saxons in the Viking Age (EPUB). Edinburgh: John Donald. ISBN 978-1-907909-25-2.
- Downham, C. (2007). Viking Kings of Britain and Ireland: The Dynasty of Ívarr to A.D. 1014. Edinburgh: Dunedin Academic Press. ISBN 978-1-903765-89-0.
- Dumville, D. (2000). "The Chronicle of the Kings of Alba". In Taylor, S. (ed.). Kings, Clerics and Chronicles in Scotland, 500–1297: Essays in Honour of Marjorie Ogilvie Anderson on the Occasion of Her Ninetieth Birthday. Dublin: Four Courts Press. pp. 73–86. ISBN 978-1-85182-516-5.
- Duncan, A. A. M. (2002). The Kingship of the Scots, 842–1292: Succession and Independence. Edinburgh: Edinburgh University Press. ISBN 0-7486-1626-8.
- Driscoll, S. T. (1998). "Church Archaeology in Glasgow and the Kingdom of Strathclyde" (PDF). The Innes Review. 49 (2): 95–114. doi:10.3366/inr.1998.49.2.95. eISSN 1745-5219. ISSN 0020-157X.
- Hudson, B. T. (1994). "Kings of Celtic Scotland". Contributions to the Study of World History. Westport, CT: Greenwood Press. ISBN 978-0-313-29087-9. ISSN 0885-9159.
- Hudson, B. T. (1998a). "The Language of the Scottish Chronicle and its European Context". Scottish Gaelic Studies. 18: 57–73 – via Google Books.
- Keynes, S. (2008). "Edgar, rex admirabilis". In Scragg, D. (ed.). Edgar, King of the English, 959–975: New Interpretations. Publications of the Manchester Centre for Anglo-Saxon Studies (series vol. 8). Woodbridge: The Boydell Press. pp. 3–58. ISBN 978-1-84383-399-4. ISSN 1478-6710.
- Lynch, M., ed. (2001). "Genealogies". The Oxford Companion to Scottish History. Oxford Companions. Oxford: Oxford University Press. pp. 677–683. ISBN 978-0-19-211696-3.
- Macquarrie, A. (1998) [1993]. "The Kings of Strathclyde, c. 400–1018". In Grant, A.; Stringer, K.J. (eds.). Medieval Scotland: Crown, Lordship and Community. Edinburgh: Edinburgh University Press. pp. 1–19. ISBN 978-0-7486-1110-2.
- Macquarrie, A (2004). "Donald [Dyfnwal son of Owen] (d. 975)". Oxford Dictionary of National Biography (online ed.). Oxford University Press. doi:10.1093/ref:odnb/49382. (Subscription, Wikipedia Library access or UK public library membership required.)
- Matthews, S. (2007). "King Edgar, Wales and Chester: The Welsh Dimension in the Ceremony of 973". Northern History. 44 (2): 9–26. doi:10.1179/174587007X208209. eISSN 1745-8706. ISSN 0078-172X. S2CID 159699748.
- McGuigan, N. (2015). Neither Scotland nor England: Middle Britain, c.850–1150 (PhD thesis). University of St Andrews. hdl:10023/7829.
- "Monarchs of Scotland (842–1707)". Oxford Dictionary of National Biography (January 2011 ed.). Oxford University Press. 2011. doi:10.1093/ref:odnb/92702. (Subscription, Wikipedia Library access or UK public library membership required.)
- Oram, R. D. (2011) [2001]. The Kings & Queens of Scotland. Brimscombe Port: The History Press. ISBN 978-0-7524-7099-3.
- Ó Corráin, D.; Maguire, F. (1981). Gaelic Personal Names. Dublin: Academy Press. ISBN 0-906187-39-7.
- Sellar, W. D. H. (2004). "Forflissa/Forbflaith/Hvarflöð". In Edwards, D. (ed.). Regions and Rulers in Ireland, 1100–1650: Essays for Kenneth Nicholls. Dublin: Four Courts Press. pp. 51–53. ISBN 978-1-85182-742-8.
- Walker, I. W. (2013) [2006]. Lords of Alba: The Making of Scotland (EPUB). Brimscombe Port: The History Press. ISBN 978-0-7524-9519-4.
- Williams, A. (2004). "An Outing on the Dee: King Edgar at Chester, AD 973". Mediaeval Scandinavia. 14: 229–243 – via Academia.edu.
- Williams, D. G. E. (1997). Land Assessment and Military Organisation in the Norse Settlements in Scotland, c. 900–1266 AD (PhD thesis). University of St Andrews. hdl:10023/7088.
- Williams, A.; Smyth, A. P.; Kirby, D. P. (1991). A Biographical Dictionary of Dark Age Britain: England, Scotland and Wales, c. 500–1050. London: Seaby. ISBN 978-1-85264-047-7.
- Woolf, A. (2000). "The "Moray Question" and the Kingship of Alba in the Tenth and Eleventh Centuries". Scottish Historical Review. 79 (2): 145–164. doi:10.3366/shr.2000.79.2.145. eISSN 1750-0222. ISSN 0036-9241. S2CID 162334631.
- Woolf, A. (2001). "Constantine II". In Lynch, M. (ed.). The Oxford Companion to Scottish History. Oxford Companions. Oxford: Oxford University Press. p. 106. ISBN 978-0-19-211696-3.
- Woolf, A. (2007). From Pictland to Alba, 789–1070. The New Edinburgh History of Scotland (series vol. 2). Edinburgh: Edinburgh University Press. ISBN 978-0-7486-1233-8.
- Woolf, A. (2009). "Scotland". In Stafford, P. (ed.). A Companion to the Early Middle Ages: Britain and Ireland, c. 500–1100. Blackwell Companions to British History. Chichester: Blackwell Publishing. pp. 251–267. ISBN 978-1-405-10628-3.

Amlaíb, King of Scotland House of Alpin Died: 977
Regnal titles
| Preceded by Cuilén | King of Alba; 971/976–977 | Succeeded by Kenneth II |
