= Kenneth II of Scotland =

King of Alba from 971 to 995

Kenneth II

King of Alba (Scotland)
- Reign: 971 or 976/977–995
- Predecessor: Cuilén or Amlaíb
- Successor: Constantine III
- Born: 932
- Died: 995; Fettercairn?
- Issue: Malcolm II of Scotland; Boite mac Cináeda? Dúngal? Suibne?
- House: Alpin
- Father: Malcolm I of Scotland

Cináed mac Maíl Coluim (Modern Scottish Gaelic: Coinneach mac Mhaoil Chaluim, (Note: Cináed mac Maíl Coluim is the Mediaeval Gaelic form.) anglicised Kenneth II, and nicknamed An Fionnghalach, "The Fratricidal"; 932–995) was King of Alba (Scotland) from 971 to 995. The son of Malcolm I (Máel Coluim mac Domnaill), he succeeded King Cuilén (Cuilén mac Iduilb) on the latter's death at the hands of Rhydderch ap Dyfnwal in 971.

== Primary sources ==
The Chronicle of the Kings of Alba was compiled in Kenneth's reign, but many of the place names mentioned are entirely corrupt, if not fictitious. Whatever the reality, the Chronicle states that "[h]e immediately plundered [Strathclyde] in part. Kenneth's infantry were slain with very great slaughter in Moin Uacoruar." The Chronicle further states that Kenneth plundered Northumbria three times, first as far as Stainmore, then to Cluiam and lastly to the River Dee by Chester. These raids may belong to around 980 when the Anglo-Saxon Chronicle records attacks on Cheshire.

In 973, the Chronicle of Melrose reports that Kenneth, with Máel Coluim I (Máel Coluim mac Domnaill), the King of Strathclyde, "Maccus, king of very many islands" (i.e., Magnús Haraldsson (Maccus mac Arailt), Kingdom of the Isles) and other kings, Welsh and Norse, came to Chester to acknowledge the overlordship of the English king Edgar the Peaceable at a council in Chester. It may be that Edgar here regulated the frontier between the southern lands of the kingdom of Alba and the northern lands of his English kingdom. Cumbria was English, and the western frontier lay on the Solway. In the east, the frontier lay somewhere in later Lothian, south of Edinburgh.

The Annals of Tigernach, in an aside, name three of the Mormaers of Alba in Kenneth's reign in an entry in 976: Cellach mac Fíndgaine, Cellach mac Baireda and Donnchad mac Morgaínd. The third of these, if not an error for Domnall mac Morgaínd, is very likely a brother of Domnall, and thus the Mormaer of Moray. The Mormaerdoms or kingdoms ruled by the two Cellachs cannot be identified.

The feud which had persisted since the death of king Indulf (Idulb mac Causantín) between his descendants and Kenneth's family persisted. In 977 the Annals of Ulster report that "Amlaíb mac Iduilb [Amlaíb, son of Indulf], king of Scotland, was killed by Cináed mac Domnaill." The Annals of Tigernach give the correct name of Amlaíb's killer: Cináed mac Maíl Coluim, or Kenneth II. Thus, even if only for a short time, Kenneth had been overthrown by the brother of the previous king.

Adam of Bremen tells that Sweyn Forkbeard found exile in Scotland at this time, but whether this was with Kenneth or one of the other kings in Scotland, is unknown. Also at this time, Njal's Saga, the Orkneyinga Saga and other sources recount wars between "the Scots" and the Northmen, but these are more probably wars between Sigurd Hlodvisson, Earl of Orkney, and the Mormaers, or Kings, of Moray.

The Chronicle says that Kenneth founded a great monastery at Brechin.

Kenneth was killed in 995, the Annals of Ulster say "by deceit" and the Annals of Tigernach say "by his subjects". Some later sources, such as the Chronicle of Melrose, John of Fordun and Andrew of Wyntoun provide more details, accurately or not. The simplest account is that he was killed by his own men in Fettercairn, through the treachery of Finnguala (also called Fimberhele or Fenella), daughter of Cuncar, Mormaer of Angus, in revenge for the killing of her only son.

The Prophecy of Berchán adds little to our knowledge, except that it names Kenneth "the kinslayer", and states he died in Strathmore.

== Children ==
Kenneth's son Malcolm II (Máel Coluim mac Cináeda) was later king of Alba. Kenneth is also identified to have had a second son, Dúngal, who was killed in 999 by his cousin Gille Coemgáin, son of Kenneth III. Boite mac Cináeda is sometimes ascribed as the son of Kenneth II, and by others as the son of Kenneth III (Cináed mac Duib), however, is more commonly counted as a son of Kenneth II. Another son of Kenneth may have been Suibne mac Cináeda, a king of the Gall Gaidheil who died in 1034.

== Interpretation ==
Kenneth's rival Amlaíb, King of Scotland is omitted by the Chronicle of the Kings of Alba and later Scottish king lists. The Irish Annals of Tigernach appear to better reflect contemporary events. Amlaíb could be a direct predecessor of Kenneth who suffered damnatio memoriae, or the rival king recognized in parts of Scotland. A period of divided kingship appears likely.

Amlaíb was the heir of his brother Cuilén, who was killed in a hall-burning. He might have served as a regent north of the River Forth, during the absence of his brother. Kenneth was brother to the deceased Dub, King of Scotland and was most likely an exile. He could claim the throne due to the support of friends and maternal kin. He was likely older and more experienced than his rival king. Amlaíb is the Gaelic form of Óláfr, suggesting maternal descent from Norsemen. He could possibly claim descent from the Uí Ímair dynasty. Alex Woolf suggests he was a grandson of Amlaíb Cuarán, King of Dublin or his cousin Olaf Guthfrithson, which suggests his own group of supporters.

== Death ==
According to John of Fordun (14th century), Kenneth II of Scotland (reigned 971–995) attempted to change the succession rules, allowing "the nearest survivor in blood to the deceased king to succeed", thus securing the throne for his own descendants. He reportedly did so to specifically exclude Constantine (III) and Kenneth (III), called Gryme in this source. The two men then jointly conspired against him, convincing Lady Finella, daughter of Cuncar, Mormaer of Angus, to kill the king. She reportedly did so to achieve personal revenge, as Kenneth II had killed her own son. Entries in the Chronicles of the Picts and Scots, collected by William Forbes Skene, provide the account of Finnela killing Kenneth II in revenge, but not her affiliation to Constantine or his cousins. These entries date to the 12th and 13th centuries. The Annals of Ulster simply record "Cinaed son of Mael Coluim [Kenneth, son of Malcolm], king of Scotland, was deceitfully killed", with no indication of who killed him.

In the account of John of Fordun, Constantine III and Gryme were "plotting unceasingly the death of the king and his son". One day, Kenneth II and his companions went hunting into the woods, "at no great distance from his own abode". The hunt took him to Fettercairn, where Finella resided. She approached him to proclaim her loyalty and invited him to visit her residence, whispering into his ear that she had information about a conspiracy. She managed to lure him to "an out-of-the-way little cottage", where a booby trap was hidden. Inside the cottage was a statue, connected by strings to a number of crossbows. If anyone touched or moved the statue, he would trigger the crossbows and fall victim to their arrows. Kenneth II gently touched the statue and "was shot through by arrows sped from all sides, and fell without uttering another word." Finella escaped through the woods and managed to join her abettors, Constantine III and Gryme. The hunting companions soon discovered the bloody king. They were unable to locate Finella but burned Fettercairn to the ground. Smyth dismisses the elaborate plotting and the mechanical contraption as mere fables, but accepts the basic details of the story, that the succession plans of Kenneth II caused his assassination. Alan Orr Anderson raised his own doubts concerning the story of Finella, which he considered "semi-mythical". He noted that the feminine name Finnguala or Findguala means "white shoulders", but suggested it derived from "find-ela" (white swan). The name figures in toponyms such as Finella Hill (near Fordoun) and Finella Den (near St Cyrus), while local tradition in The Mearns (Kincardineshire) has Finella walking atop the treetops from one location to the other. Anderson thus theorized that Finella could be a mythical figure, suggesting she was a local stream-goddess. A later passage of John of Fordun mentions Finele as mother of Macbeth, King of Scotland (reigned 1040–1057), but this is probably an error based on the similarity of names. Macbeth was son of Findláech of Moray, not of a woman called Finella.

== See also ==
- Dalziel

== Notes ==
Kenneth II of Scotland House of Alpin Died: 995
Regnal titles
Preceded by Cuilén; Amlaíb	King of Alba; 971–995	Succeeded by Constantine III
