= Giric =

King of the Picts from 878 to 889

Giric mac Dúngail

King of the Picts
- Reign: 878–889
- Predecessor: Áed
- Successor: Donald II
- Born: c. 832
- Died: c. 890; Dundurn, Scotland
- Father: Dúngal

Giric mac Dúngail (Modern Gaelic: Griogair mac Dhunghail; fl. c. 878–889), in modern English his name is Gregory or Greg MacDougal and nicknamed Mac Rath ("Son of Fortune"), was a king of the Picts or the king of Alba. The Irish annals record nothing of Giric's reign, nor do Anglo-Saxon writings add anything, and the meagre information which survives is contradictory. Modern historians disagree as to whether Giric was the sole king or ruled jointly with Eochaid, on his ancestry, and if he should be considered a Pictish king or the first king of Alba.

Although little is now known of Giric, he appears to have been regarded as an important figure in Scotland in the High Middle Ages and the Late Middle Ages. Scots chroniclers such as John of Fordun, Andrew of Wyntoun, Hector Boece and the humanist scholar George Buchanan wrote of Giric as "King Gregory the Great" and told how he had conquered half of England and Ireland too.

The Chronicle of Melrose and some versions of the Chronicle of the Kings of Alba say that Giric died at Dundurn in Strathearn.

== Giric's name ==
Giric's name is associated with that of Saint Cyricus, who, as a small child, was martyred along with his mother, Julitta, during the Diocletianic persecution in the early fourth century. According to the Chronicles of the Kings of Alba, Cyricus was Giric's patron saint, not only because his name is homophonous with the Latin form of the saint's name, Ciricum, but also because the first church dedicated to St Cyricus was established during Giric's reign at a place called Ecclesgreig (now St Cyrus) in Aberdeenshire. The feast day of Cyricus is the 16th of June, and on that day in 885 there was a solar eclipse, and not long after the occasion of the eclipse, the two "were expelled from the kingdom."

== Relationship between Giric and Eochaid ==
Various theories have been put forward regarding the relationship between Eochaid and Giric, who by all accounts was the elder of the two. The Chronicle of the Kings of Alba, which was written in Latin, used the phrase alumnus ordinatorque to describe relationship of Giric to Eochaid. Translator T. H. Weeks chose to translate that phrase into English as "teacher and prime minister", yet in the same section offered "foster-son" for alumnus, translating "Eochodius, cum alum(p)no suo, expulsus est nunc de regno" as "Eochaid with his "foster-son" was then thrown out of the kingdom".

There is a tendency in popular history books and web sites to refer to the two as "cousins" or "first cousins once removed".

However, this cousin kinship is only speculation since the ancestry of Giric is obscure. Rhun, the father of Eochaid, is known to have been "a king of the Britons", but little is known of Dungal, the father of Giric, which may be the reason for the speculation that he (Dungal) did not have a royal lineage. Perhaps a writer for the popular web site Undiscovered Scotland found the best solution, referring to Giric as Eochaid's "rather shadowy kinsman".

Two scholars have defined the two in political rather than kinship terms. A. Weeks, commentator, speculated, "Possibly Giric was not of royal blood, so he used Eochaid as a puppet". In 1904, Sir John Rhys, professor at University of Oxford, reached a similar conclusion, positing that "the real relation in which Girg probably stood to Eochaid was that of a non Celtic king of Pictish descent wielding the power of the Pictish nation with Eochaid ruling among the Brythons of Fortrenn more or less subject to him". What is known of the two is that in 878 Giric killed Aed (uncle of Eochaid) "in battle" in the town of Nrurim, which was probably north of Stirling. Then Giric and Eochaid, whatever their relationship, ruled jointly for eleven years.

== Son of Fortune ==
... the Son of Fortune shall come; he shall rule over Alba as one Lord.
The Britons will be low in his time; high will be Alba of melodious boats.
Pleasant to my heart and my body is what my spirit tells me:
The rule of the Son of Fortune in his land in the east will cast misery from Scotland.
Seventeen years (in fortresses of valour) in the sovereignty of Scotland.
He will have in bondage in his house Saxons, Foreigners, and Britons.
The Prophecy of Berchán.

The Prophecy of Berchán, an 11th century verse history of Scots and Irish kings presented as a prophecy, is a notably difficult source. As the Prophecy refers to kings by epithets, but never by name, linking it to other materials is not straightforward. The Prophecy is believed to refer to Giric by the epithet Mac Rath, "the Son of Fortune".

The entry on Giric in the Chronicle of the Kings of Alba is perhaps corrupt. It states:

And Eochaid, son of Run, the king of the Britons [of Strathclyde, and] grandson of Kenneth by his daughter reigned for eleven years; although other say that Giric, the son of another, reigned at this time because he became Eochaid's foster-father and guardian.
And in [Eochaid's] second year, Áed, Niall's son, died; and his ninth year, on the very day of [St] Cyricus, an eclipse of the sun occurred. Eochaid with his foster-father was now expelled from the kingdom.

Kenneth is Kenneth MacAlpin (Cináed mac Ailpín); Áed, Niall's son is Áed Findliath, who died on 20 November 879; and St Cyrus's day was 16 June, on which day a solar eclipse occurred in 885.

== Gregory the Great ==
By the 12th century, Giric had acquired legendary status as liberator of the Scottish church from Pictish oppression and, fantastically, as conqueror of Ireland and most of England. As a result, Giric was known as Gregory the Great. This tale appears in the variant of the Chronicle of the Kings of Alba which is interpolated in Andrew of Wyntoun's Orygynale Cronykil of Scotland. Here Giric, or Grig, is named "Makdougall", son of Dúngal.

List "D", which may be taken as typical, contains this account of Giric:

Giric, Dungal's son, reigned for twelve years; and he died in Dundurn, and was buried in Iona. He subdued to himself all Ireland, and nearly [all] England; and he was the first to give liberty to the Scottish church, which was in servitude up to that time, after the custom and fashion of the Picts.

Giric's conquests appear as Bernicia, rather than Ireland (Hibernia), in some versions. William Forbes Skene saw a connection between this and the account in the Historia de Sancto Cuthberto which claims that soon after the death of King Halfdan, the Northumbrians and the Northmen united under King Guthfrith to defeat a Scots invasion.

This account is not found in the Poppleton Manuscript. The lists known as "D", "F", "I", "K", and "N", contain a different version, copied by the Chronicle of Melrose.

== Ut regem nostrum Girich ==
In a recent discussion of the "Dunkeld Litany", which was largely fabricated in Schottenklöster in Germany in Late Medieval and Early Modern times, Thomas Owen Clancy offers the provisional conclusion that, within the emendations and additions, there lies an authentic 9th century Litany. The significance of this Litany for the question of Giric's authenticity and kingship is contained in a prayer for the king and the army, where the king named is Giric:

Ut regem nostrum Girich cum exercito suo ab omnibus inimicorum insiidis tuearis et defendas, te rogamus audi nos.

== He shall rule over Alba as one Lord ==
Archie Duncan argues that the association of Giric and Eochaid in the kingship is spurious, that Giric alone was king of the Picts, which he claimed as the son of a daughter of Kenneth MacAlpin, and that the report that he was Eochaid's guardian (alumpnus) is a misreading of an uncle (auunculus). A. P. Smyth proposed that Giric was a nephew of Kenneth MacAlpin, the son of his brother Donald MacAlpin (Domnall mac Ailpín), which appears to rest on what is probably a scribal error. The entry also states that an otherwise unknown Causantín, son of Domnaill (or of Dúngail) was king. Finally, Benjamin Hudson has suggested that Giric, rather than being a member of the Cenél nGabráin dynasty of Kenneth MacAlpin and his kin, was a member of the northern Cenél Loairn – descended House of Moray, and accepts the existence of Giric's brother Causantín.

== Sources ==
- Alan Orr Anderson; Early Sources of Scottish History A.D. 500–1286, volume 1. Reprinted with corrections, Paul Watkins, Stamford, 1990 ISBN 1-871615-03-8
- Alan Orr Anderson; Scottish Annals from English Chronicles, D. Nutt, London, 1908.
- Marjorie Ogilvie Anderson; Kings and Kingship in Early Scotland, Scottish Academic Press, Edinburgh, revised edition 1980. ISBN 0-7011-1604-8
- Dauvit Broun; "Giric, King of Picts" in John Cannon (ed.), The Oxford Companion to British History, Oxford University Press, Oxford, 1997. ISBN 0-19-860514-5
- Thomas Owen Clancy; "Scottish Saints and National Identities in the Early Middle Ages" in Alan Thacker & Richard Sharpe (eds), Local Saints and Local Churches in the Early Medieval West, Oxford University Press, Oxford, 2002. ISBN 0-19-820394-2
- A. A. M. Duncan; The Kingship of the Scots 842–1292: Succession and Independence, Edinburgh University Press, Edinburgh, 2002. ISBN 0-7486-1626-8
- Hudson, Benjamin T.; The Prophecy of Berchán: Irish and Scottish High-Kings of the Early Middle Ages, Greenwood, London, 1996.
- Alfred P. Smyth; Warlords and Holy Men: Scotland A.D. 80–1000, E.J. Arnold, London, 1984 (reprinted Edinburgh University Press). ISBN 0-7486-0100-7
- Ann Williams, Alfred P. Smyth and D. P. Kirby; A Biographical Dictionary of Dark-Age Britain, Seaby, London, 1991. ISBN 1-85264-047-2

Giric Alpínid dynasty
Regnal titles
Preceded by Áed mac Cináeda	King of the Picts; 878–889 with Eochaid	Succeeded by Donald II of Scotland
