= Berchan =

Berchan may refer to:

- Briceni, city in Moldova
- Berchán, legendary Irish saint
