= Indulf =

King of Alba from 954 to 962

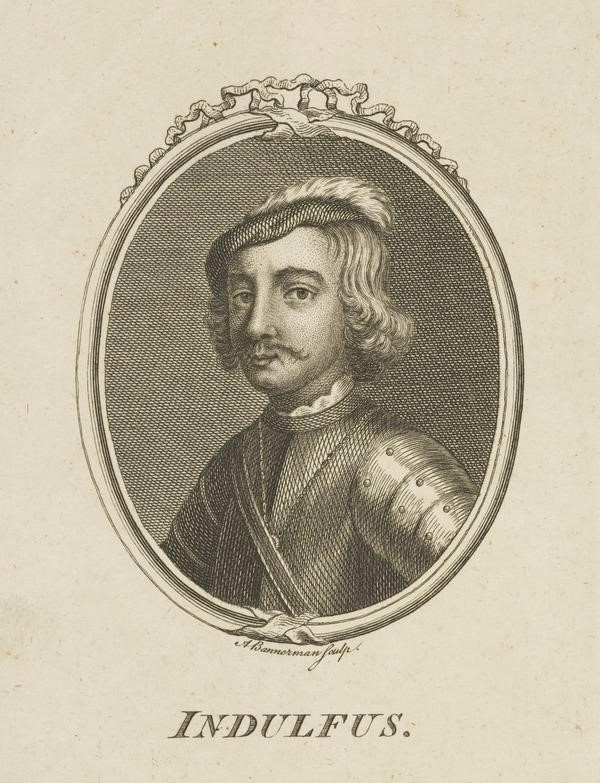
- 1734 imaginary engraving of Indulf by Alexander Bannerman

King of Alba (Scotland)
- Reign: 954–962
- Predecessor: Malcolm I
- Successor: Dub
- Born: c. 927
- Died: 962; Cullen? or Monastery of St Andrews
- Burial: Iona
- Issue: Cuilén, King of Alba; Amlaíb, King of Alba; Eochaid
- House: Alpin
- Father: Constantine II, King of Alba

Ildulb mac Causantín, anglicised as Indulf or Indulph, nicknamed An Ionsaighthigh, "the Aggressor" (c. 927 – 962) was king of Alba from 954 to 962. He was the son of Constantine II; his mother may have been a daughter of Earl Eadulf I of Bernicia, who was an exile in Scotland.

== Biography ==
Indulf was probably baptised in 927. According to William of Malmesbury, Æthelstan stood godfather to a son of Constantine at the Church of Dacre. The Anglo-Saxon Chronicle dates the meeting of Æthelstan with the northern kings at Eamont to the 12 July 927. So, it is likely that this baptism occurred on, or around, the feast of Saint Hildulf, which Alex Woolf suggests may be the source of his uncommon name.

John of Fordun and others supposed that Indulf had been king of Strathclyde in the reign of his predecessor, based on their understanding that the kingdom of Strathclyde had become a part of the kingdom of Alba in the 940s. This, however, is no longer accepted.

The Chronicle of the Kings of Alba says: "In his time oppidum Eden", usually identified as Edinburgh, "was evacuated, and abandoned to the Scots until the present day." This has been read as indicating that Lothian, or some large part of it, fell to Indulf at this time. However, the conquest of Lothian is likely to have been a process rather than a single event, and the frontier between the lands of the kings of Alba and Bernicia may have lain south and east of Edinburgh many years before Indulf's reign.

Indulf's death is reported by the Chronicon Scotorum in 962, the Chronicle of the Kings of Alba adding that he was killed fighting Vikings near Cullen, at the Battle of Bauds. The Prophecy of Berchán, however, claims that he died "in the house of the same holy apostle, where his father [died]", that is at the céli dé monastery of St Andrews. He was buried on Iona.

Indulf was succeeded by Dub (Dub mac Maíl Coluim), son of his predecessor. His sons Cuilén and Amlaíb were later kings. Eochaid, a third son, was killed with Cuilén by the men of Strathclyde in 971.

== Sources ==
- Anderson, Alan Orr; Early Sources of Scottish History AD 500–1286, volume 1. Reprinted with corrections. Paul Watkins, Stamford, 1990. ISBN 1-871615-03-8
- Duncan, A. A. M.; The Kingship of the Scots 842–1292: Succession and Independence, Edinburgh University Press, Edinburgh, 2002. ISBN 0-7486-1626-8
- Smyth, Alfred P.; Warlords and Holy Men: Scotland AD 80–1000, Reprinted, Edinburgh University Press, Edinburgh, 1998. ISBN 0-7486-0100-7
- Walker, Ian W.; Lords of Alba: The Making of Scotland, Sutton, Stroud, 2006. ISBN 0-7509-3492-1

Indulf House of Alpin Died: 962
Regnal titles
Preceded by Malcolm I	King of Alba; 954–962	Succeeded by Dub
