= Battle of Bauds =

Battle fought in 962 in Moray between Scotland and Norse pirates

Coordinates: 57.649°N 2.893°W

- Part of the Viking invasions of Scotland
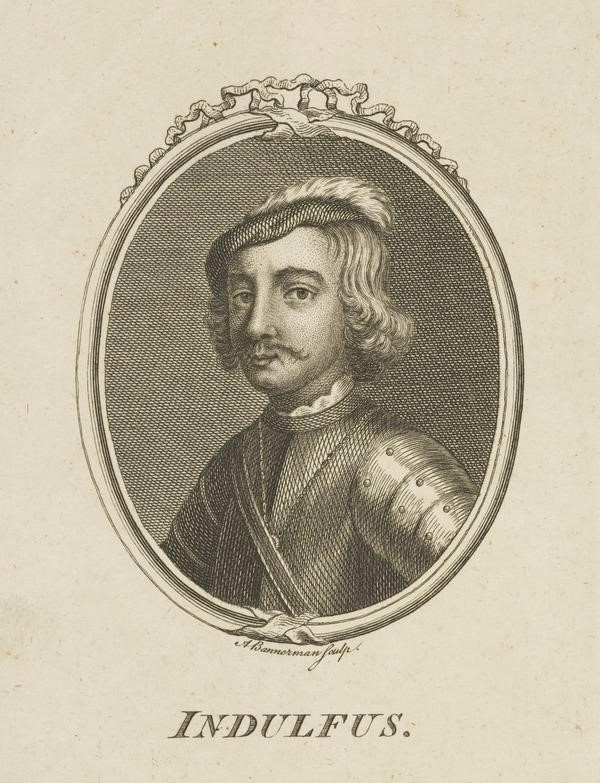
- Imaginary drawing of Indulf, the famous Scottish king who fell during the Battle of Bauds
Date	962
Location	near Cullen, Scotland
Result	Scottish victory

Belligerents
Kingdom of Alba	Kingdom of Norway

Commanders and leaders
King Indulf †	Unknown, possibly sons of Erik Bloodaxe

Battle of Bauds was fought in 962 in an area known as the Bauds, south of Findochty and west of Cullen near Portknockie, Scotland between Scotland, under King Indulf, and Norse pirates. The Vikings had been raiding and burning through Scotland, and had won numerous skirmishes against the Scots, including the Battle of Dollar. However, in this battle, the Norsemen were defeated. Afterwards, Norse control in Scotland fell apart. However, Indulf was killed in the battle.
