= Áed mac Cináeda =

King of the Picts from 877 to 878

King of the Picts
- Reign: 877–878
- Predecessor: Causantín mac Cináeda
- Successor: Giric and Eochaid
- Died: 878; Strathallan
- Burial: Iona
- Issue: Constantín mac Áeda
- House: Alpin
- Father: Cináed mac Ailpín (Kenneth I)

Áed mac Cináeda (Modern Scottish Gaelic: Aodh mac Choinnich; Latin: Ethus; Anglicized: Hugh; died 878) was a son of Cináed mac Ailpín (Kenneth MacAlpin). He became king of the Picts in 877 when he succeeded his brother Constantín mac Cináeda. He was posthumously given the epithet "Fhionnscothach" (of the White Flowers) by the Duan Albanach.

== Sources ==
The Chronicle of the Kings of Alba says of Áed: "Edus [Áed] held the same [i.e., the kingdom] for one year. The shortness of his reign has bequeathed nothing memorable to history. He was slain in the civitas of Nrurim." Nrurim is unidentified.

The Annals of Ulster says that, in 878, "Áed mac Cináeda, king of the Picts, was killed by his associates." Tradition, reported by George Chalmers in his Caledonia (1807), and by the New Statistical Account (1834–1845), has it that the early-historic mound of the Cunninghillock by Inverurie is the burial place of Áed. This is based on reading Nrurim as Inruriu.

A longer account is interpolated in Andrew of Wyntoun's Orygynale Cronykil of Scotland. This says that Áed reigned for one year and was killed by his successor Giric in Strathallan and other king lists have the same report.

It is uncertain which if any, of The Prophecy of Berchán's kings should be taken to be Áed. William Forbes Skene presumed that the following verses referred to Áed:

129. Another king will take [sovereignty]; small is the profit that he does not divide. Alas for Scotland thenceforward. His name will be the Furious.
130. He will be but a short time over Scotland. The will be no [word uncertain] unplundered. Alas for Scotland, through the youth; alas for their books, alas for their bequests.
131. He will be nine years in the kingdom. I shall tell you – it will be a tale of truth – he dies without bell, with communion, at evening, in a fatal pass.

Áed's son, Constantín mac Áeda, became king in 900.

== See also ==
- Kingdom of Alba

== Sources ==
- Anderson, Alan Orr; Early Sources of Scottish History A.D. 500–1286, volume 1. Reprinted with corrections, Paul Watkins, Stamford, 1990. ISBN 1-871615-03-8
- Anderson, Marjorie Ogilvie; Kings and Kingship in Early Scotland, Scottish Academic Press, Edinburgh, revised edition 1980. ISBN 0-7011-1604-8
- Duncan, A. A. M.; The Kingship of the Scots 842–1292: Succession and Independence, Edinburgh University Press, Edinburgh, 2002. ISBN 0-7486-1626-8
- Smyth, Alfred P.; Warlords and Holy Men: Scotland A.D. 80–1000, E.J. Arnold, London, 1984 (reprinted Edinburgh University Press). ISBN 0-7486-0100-7

Áed mac Cináeda Alpínid dynasty Died: 878
Regnal titles
Preceded by Constantín mac Cináeda	King of the Picts; 877–878	Succeeded by Giric; Eochaid
