= Dundurn, Scotland =

Coordinates: 56.3839°N 4.0939°W

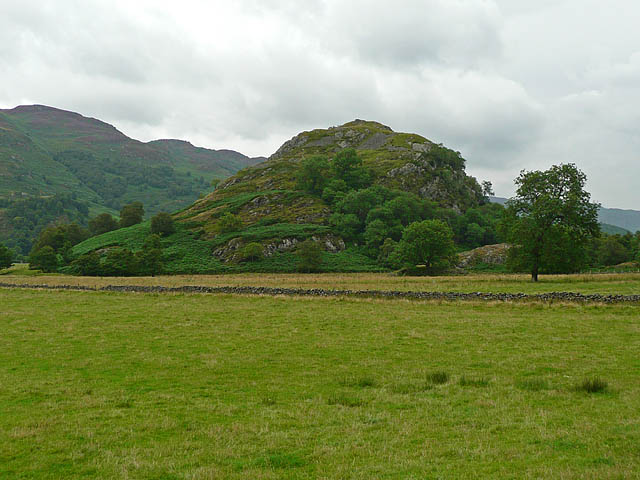
St Fillan's Hill, the site of the Dundurn hillfort.

Dundurn is the site of a Pictish hillfort in what is now Strathearn in Perth and Kinross, Scotland.

The fort was situated on a hill with the River Earn to one side and the Allt Ghoinean burn to another. Excavations have identified three stages of fortification between 500 and 800 AD.

The fort at Dundurn (or Dún Duirn) is mentioned twice in the Annals of Ulster, firstly relating to a siege in 683 AD, at which time it was held by King Bridei III, and secondly as the location of the death of a King Giric (King Gregory) in 889 AD.

It is a designated scheduled monument.
