= House of Alpin =

Early Medieval royal family

- Country: Kingdom of the Picts? Kingdom of Dál Riata?
- Founded: Before 763
- Founder: Alpín mac Echdach
- Final ruler: Malcolm II of Scotland
- Titles: High King of Alba; King of the Picts; King of Picts and Scots; King of Alba; King of Dál Riata (possibly)
- Dissolution: 1034

House of Alpin

The House of Alpin, also known as the Alpinid dynasty, Clann Chináeda, and Clann Chinaeda meic Ailpín, was the kin-group which ruled in Pictland, possibly Dál Riata, and then the kingdom of Alba from Constantine II (Causantín mac Áeda) in the 940s until the death of Malcolm II (Máel Coluim mac Cináeda) in 1034.

Kings traced their descent from Kenneth MacAlpin (and not from his father, Alpín mac Echdach), and Irish genealogies in the Book of Ballymote and the Book of Lecan refer to the kindred as Clann Cináeda meic Ailpín by prioritising descent from Kenneth.

The origins of the family are uncertain. Later genealogies make Kenneth a descendant of Áed Find. While plausible, such claims are unprovable and appear only in the late tenth century. The associated idea that Kenneth had been a king in Dál Riata before he contended successfully for power in Pictland in the 840s, following the death of Eóganán mac Óengusa, is supported by nearly contemporary evidence.

Early kings of Clann Cináeda meic Ailpín are described as kings of the Picts, and the third king, Kenneth's son Constantine I (Causantín mac Cináeda), appears to have been regarded as the last of the 70 Pictish kings soon after his death. The descendants of Kenneth were ousted in 878, when Constantine I's brother, Áed mac Cináeda, was killed by Giric mac Dúngail, but they returned in 889, when Constantine I's son Donald II (Domnall mac Causantín) ascended the throne upon the death or deposition of Giric. Donald II and his successors are described as kings of Alba.

During the tenth century, succession alternated between the descendants of Constantine I and those of Áed. Internecine strife in the late tenth and early eleventh centuries left the descendants of Constantine I unchallenged by male-line descendants of Kenneth MacAlpin, but Malcolm II left no male heirs. On Malcolm's death, the line of kings descended from Kenneth came to an end. Future kings, while still tracing their descent from Kenneth, were descended from Malcolm's daughter Bethóc and her husband Crinan of Dunkeld.

== See also ==
- Scottish monarchs' family tree#House of Alpin
- Siol Alpin
