= Chronicle of the Kings of Alba =

Medieval chronicle

The Chronicle of the Kings of Alba, or Scottish Chronicle, is a short written chronicle covering the period from the time of Kenneth MacAlpin (Cináed mac Ailpín) (d. 858) until the reign of Kenneth II (Cináed mac Maíl Coluim) (r. 971–995). W.F. Skene called it the Chronicle of the Kings of Scots, and some have called it the Older Scottish Chronicle, but Chronicle of the Kings of Alba is emerging as the standard scholarly name.

The sole surviving version of the text comes from the Poppleton Manuscript, now in the Bibliothèque Nationale, Paris. It is the fourth of seven consecutive Scottish documents in the manuscript, the first six of which were probably put together in the early thirteenth century by the man who wrote de Situ Albanie. The Chronicle is a vital source for the period it covers, and, despite some later Francization, is very much written in Hiberno-Latin, showing evidence of a scribe with some knowledge of contemporary Middle Irish orthography. The original text was without doubt written in Scotland, probably in the early eleventh century, shortly after the reign of Kenneth II, the last reign it relates.

== Bibliography ==
- Chronicle of the Kings of Alba
  - Anderson, Marjorie O. (ed.). Kings and Kingship in Early Scotland. 2nd ed. Edinburgh, 1980. 249–53.
  - Hudson, B.T. (ed. and tr.). Scottish Historical Review 77 (1998): 129–61.
  - Anderson, Alan Orr (tr.). Early Sources of Scottish History: AD 500–1286. Vol. 1. Edinburgh, 1923.
- Anderson, Marjorie O. Kings and Kingship in Early Scotland. 2nd ed. Edinburgh, 1980. First edition: 1973.
- Skene, William F., Chronicles of the Picts and Scots: And Other Memorials of Scottish History. Edinburgh, 1867.

== See also ==
- The Prophecy of Berchán
- Duan Albanach
- Pictish Chronicle
- Senchus fer n-Alban
