= The Prophecy of Berchán =

1200 poem by Berchán in Middle Irish

The Prophecy of Berchán is a relatively long historical poem written in the Middle Irish language. The text is preserved in the Royal Irish Academy as MS 679 (23/G/4), with a few early modern copies. It is a prophecy made in the Early Middle Ages.

== Composition ==
The text consists of 205 debide stanzas, two of which are corrupt (128, 168). It is divided into two parts. The reputed author of part one (stanzas 1-96) is an Irish abbot named Berchán, from whom the poem's name originates. Part one consists of a history of Berchán's own monastery, a recount of Viking attacks, and descriptions of the reigns of nineteen Irish kings.

Part two (stanzas 97–206) is presented as an anonymous prophecy given around the death of Saint Patrick in the 5th century, prophesying the life of Columba and King Áedán mac Gabráin, and 24 Scottish kings, from Cináed mac Ailpín (d. 858) to Domnall Bán (d. 1097). The poem is very indirect in its identification of Scottish kings, and uses many obscure poetic images and similes. Unlike the Irish kings in part one, there are no accompanying glosses naming the kings. However, the Scottish kings spoken of can be identified, and the evidence made useful. The poem is one of the most important sources for Scottish history in the period it covers.

== Bibliography ==
- Anderson, Alan Orr, Early Sources of Scottish History: AD 500–1286, 2 vols, Edinburgh: Oliver and Boyd, 1922; Vol. I, pp. xxxiv–xxxv
