= Family tree of Scottish monarchs =

This is a family tree for the kings and queens of Scotland, since the unification under the House of Alpin in 834, to the personal union with England in 1603 under James VI and I. It includes also the Houses of Dunkeld, Balliol, Bruce, and Stewart.

See also: List of Scottish monarchs - Scotland - History of Scotland - List of British monarchs - Family tree of the British royal family - Family tree of British monarchs

== Family tree of the royal houses ==
Blue borders indicate monarchs	Bold borders indicate close relatives of the monarchs (parents, spouse(s) and children)	Bold blue borders indicate monarchs who were close relatives of the monarchs (parents, spouse(s) and children)	Green borders indicate Scottish throne pretenders

House of Alpin	House of Moray	House of Dunkeld	House of Sverre	House of Balliol	House of Bruce	House of Stewart

Alpin	Alpín mac Echdach; King of Dál Riata
Domnall I mac Ailpín; 812–862; King of the Picts r. 858–862	Kenneth I MacAlpin; 810–858/859; King of the Picts r. 841/843–858/859
Giric c. 832–889; King of the Picts r. 878–889	Constantín I mac Cináeda; King of the Picts r. 862–877	Áed; Findliath; High King of Ireland	Máel Muire ingen Cináeda	Flann Sinna; 847/848–916; High King of Ireland	Áed mac Cináeda d. 878; King of the Picts r. 877–878	?	Rhun; King of Alt Clut r. 872–878
Donald II mac Causantín; King of Alba r. 889–900	Constantine II before 879–952; King of Alba r. 900–943	Eochaid; King of the Picts r. 878–889
Malcolm I c. 900–954; King of Alba r. 943–954	Indulf; King of Alba r. 954–962	Cellach d. 937
Dub; King of Alba r. 962–967	Kenneth II before 954–995; King of Alba r. 971–995	Cuilén; King of Alba r. 967–971	Amlaíb mac Ilduilb; King of Alba r. 973–977	Eochaid d. 971
Kenneth III before 967–1005; King of Alba r. 997–1005	Malcolm II c. 954–1034; King of Scots r. 1005–1034	Constantine III before 971–997; King of Alba r. 995–997
Moray	Dunkeld
Gille; Coemgáin	Giric d. 1005	Boite mac Cináeda d. 1058	Findláech d. 1020; Mormaer of Moray	Donada	unnamed female	Sigurd the Stout c. 960–1014; Earl of Orkney	Bethóc	Crínán of Dunkeld d. 1045; Mormaer of Atholl
Gille; Coemgáin d. 1032; Mormaer of Moray	Gruoch of Scotland fl. 1020–1054	Macbeth; 1005–1057; King of Alba r. 1040–1057	Duncan I c. 1001–1040; King of Alba r. 1034–1040
Lulach the fool before 1033–1058; King of Alba r. 1057–1058	Edward the Exile; 1016–1057
Máel; Snechtai; Mormaer of Moray	William I the Conqueror c. 1028–1087; King of England	Edgar the Ætheling	Margaret of Scotland c. 1045–1093	Malcolm III; Canmore c. 1031–1093; King of Alba r. 1058–1093	Ingibiorg; Finnsdottir	Máel Muire; Earl of Atholl	Donald III; Bane c. 1033–1099; King of Alba r. 1093–1094, r. 1094–1097
Edith; Matilda	Henry I c. 1068–1135; King of England	William II c. 1056–1100; King of England	Edmund of Scotland	Adela of Normandy m. Stephen II of Blois	Mary m. Eustace III of Boulogne	Edgar c. 1074–1107; King of Alba r. 1097–1107	David I 1084–1153; King of Alba r. 1124–1153	Duncan II c. 1060–1094; King of Alba r. 1094	Bethoc m. Uchtred of Tynedale
Empress; Matilda; 1102–1167	Constance m. Richard I de Beaumont; Skip a generation	Sibylla of Normandy	Alexander I c. 1078–1124; King of Alba r. 1107–1124	Stephen of Blois c. 1092/1096–1154; King of England	Matilda of Boulogne	Henry of Scotland; 1114–1152; Earl of Huntingdon	William fitz Duncan d. 1147; Earl of Moray	Hextilda m. Richard Comyn	Walter fitz Alan c. 1090–1177; 1st High Steward
Henry II; 1133–1189; King of England	Ermengarde de Beaumont c. 1170–1233/1234	William I the Lion c. 1143–1214; King of Alba r. 1165–1214	Ada of Huntingdon c. 1146–after 1206	Floris III; 1141–1190; Count of Holland	Malcolm IV; 1141–1165; King of Alba r. 1153–1165	William; Comyn; Lord of Badenoch	David of Scotland c. 1144–1219; Earl of Huntingdon	Alan fitz Walter; 1140–1204; 2nd High Steward
illegitimate children
Bruce
John I 1166–1216; King of England	Richard I 1157–1199; King of England	Dirk VII d. 1203; Count of Holland	William I c. 1167–1222; Count of Holland	Margaret of Huntingdon m. Alan, Lord of Galloway	Richard; Comyn	Alexander; Comyn d. 1289; Earl of Buchan	Ada m. Henry de Hastings; Baron Hastings]]	Ada m. Patrick I, Earl of Dunbar	John c. 1207–1237; Earl of Huntingdon	Isobel of Huntingdon m. Robert de Brus, Lord of Annandale	Walter Stewart of Dundonald d. 1246; 3rd High Steward
Joan of England; 1210–1238	Alexander II; 1198–1249; King of Alba r. 1214–1249	Marie de Coucy c. 1218–1285	Floris IV; 1210–1234; Count of Holland	Devorguilla of Galloway m. John I de Balliol	John I Comyn of Badenoch c. 1215 – c. 1275	John Hastings; 1262–1313; Baron Hastings	Patrick II; 1185–1249; Earl of Dunbar	Euphemia; Stewart	Robert V de Brus c. 1210–1295; Lord of Annandale	Margaret m. Niall, Earl of Carrick
Balliol
Henry III; 1207–1272; King of England	William II; 1227–1256; Count of Holland	John; Balliol c. 1249–1314; King of Scots r. 1292–1296	Alianora	John II; Comyn d. 1302; Lord of Badenoch	John Hastings; 1287–1325; Baron Hastings	Patrick III c. 1213–1289; Earl of Dunbar	Robert VI de Brus; 1243–1304; Lord of Annandale	Marjorie of Carrick c. 1253/1256–c. 1292	Alexander Stewart; 1214–1283; 4th High Steward
Edward I 1239–1307; King of England	Margaret of England; 1240–1275	Alexander III; 1241–1286; King of Scots r. 1249–1286	Floris V 1254–1296; Count of Holland	Edward; Balliol c. 1283–1367	John III; Comyn d. 1306; Lord of Badenoch	Marjorie	Patrick IV; 1242–1308; Earl of March	Cecilia Dunbar	James Stewart d. 1309; 5th High Steward
Sverre
Edward II; 1284–1327; King of England	Alexander of Scotland; 1264–1284	Margaret of Scotland; 1261–1283	Eric II of Norway; 1268–1299	Isabel Bruce c. 1272–1358	Elizabeth de Burgh c. 1284–1327	Robert I the Bruce; 1274–1329; King of Scots r. 1306–1329	Isabella of Mar c. 1277–1296
Stewart
Edward III; 1312–1377; King of England	Margaret; 1283–1290; Maid of Norway; Queen-designate of Scots r. 1286–1290	Joan of the Tower; 1321–1362	David II; 1324–1371; King of Scots r. 1329–1371	Margaret; Drummond c. 1340–after 1375	Marjorie Bruce; 1296–1316	Walter Stewart c. 1296–1327; 6th High Steward
m1. Elizabeth Mure d. before 1355	Robert II; 1316–1390; King of Scots r. 1371–1390	m2. Euphemia de Ross d. 1386
Anabella Drummond c. 1350–1401	Robert III; 1337–1406; King of Scots r. 1390–1406	David Stewart; 1357–c. 1386; Earl of Strathearn	Walter Stewart d. 1437; Earl of Atholl	Margaret; Barclay	Elizabeth Stewart	David Lindsay c. 1360–1407; Earl of Crawford	Egidia	William Douglas of Nithsdale c. 1370–1391
Johanna	Walter Stewart c. 1338–1362; Lord of Fife	Isabella; MacDuff; Countess of Fife	Robert Stewart c. 1340–1420; Duke of Albany	Margaret Graham of Menteith; 1334–1380	Alexander Stewart; 1343–1405; Earl of Buchan	Euphemia I Countess of Ross d. 1394/1398	Margaret	John of Islay d. 1386; Lord of the Isles
John Dunbar d. 1390; Earl of Moray	Marjorie	Alexander; Keith	Elizabeth	Thomas de la Hay c. 1342–1406; Lord High Constable of Scotland	Isabella	James c. 1358–1388; Earl of Douglas	Katherine	Robert Logan; High Admiral
David; 1378–1402; Duke of Rothesay	Marjory; Douglas	Joan Beaufort c. 1404–1445	James I 1394–1437; King of Scots r. 1406–1437	Margaret	Archibald Douglas; 1372–1424; Earl of Douglas	George Douglas; 1380–1403; Earl of Angus	Mary	Elizabeth	James Douglas; Lord Dalkeith
Louis XI; 1423–1483; King of France	Margaret Stewart; 1424–1445	Isabella Stewart; 1426–1494/1499	Francis I 1414–1450; Duke of Brittany	Eleanor; 1433–1480	Sigismund; 1427–1496; Archduke of Austria	Mary; Ctss. of Buchan before 1428–1465	Wolfert VI of Borselen c. 1433–1486
Mary of Guelders c. 1434–1463	James II; 1430–1460; King of Scots r. 1437–1460	Louis; 1436/1437–1482; King of Cyprus	Annabella c. 1433–1509	George d. 1501; Earl of Huntly	Joan Stewart c. 1428–after 1486	James Douglas; 1426–1493; Earl of Morton
Katherine; Sinclair	Alexander c. 1454–1485; Duke of Albany	Anne de la Tour d'Auvergne d. 1512	David c. 1455–before 1457; Earl of Moray	John c. 1456 – c. 1479; Earl of Mar
James; 1415–1479; Lord Hamilton	Mary; 1453–1488	Thomas d. 1472; Earl of Arran	James III; 1451–1488; King of Scots r. 1460–1488	Margaret of Denmark; 1456–1486	Margaret b. c. 1455
Elizabeth; Hamilton d. after 1531	Henry VII; 1457–1509; King of England
John c. 1490–1526; Earl of Lennox	Archibald Douglas; 1489–1557; Earl of Angus	Margaret; Tudor; 1489–1541	James IV; 1473–1513; King of Scots r. 1488–1513	James; 1476–1504; Duke of Ross	John; 1479–1503; Earl of Mar
Matthew; 1526–1571; Earl of Lennox	Margaret; Douglas; 1515–1578	Madeleine of Valois; 1520–1537	James V 1512–1542; King of Scots r. 1513–1542	Mary of Guise; 1515–1560	James; 1507–1508; Duke of Rothesay	Arthur; 1509–1510; Duke of Rothesay	Alexander; 1514–1515; Duke of Ross
Henry; Stuart; Lord Darnley; 1545–1567	Mary I 1542–1587; Queen of Scots r. 1542–1567	Francis II; 1544–1560; King of France	James c. 1534–1578; Earl of Bothwell	James; 1540–1541; Duke of Rothesay
James VI (Note: Title as King of Scotland); 1566–1625; King of Scots r. 1567–1625; King of England r. 1603–1625	House of Stuart continues on Family tree of the British royal family)
