= Henry St Clair =

Henry St Clair or Sinclair may refer to:

- Henry I St Clair of Herdmanston 12th century Scottish noble
- Henry St Clair, 7th Baron of Roslin 13th-14th Scottish baron
- Henry St. Clair (American politician), politician who represented Macon County, Alabama in 1872
- Henry I Sinclair, Earl of Orkney
- Henry II Sinclair, Earl of Orkney
- Henry Sinclair, 4th Lord Sinclair
- Henry Sinclair, 6th Lord Sinclair
- Henry Sinclair, 7th Lord Sinclair

== See also ==
- Henry Sinclair (disambiguation)
