= Archibald Douglas, 3rd Earl of Douglas =

Medieval Scottish nobleman (c. 1330–1400)

Archibald Douglas
- Lord of Galloway; Earl of Douglas; Earl of Wigtown; Lord of Bothwell
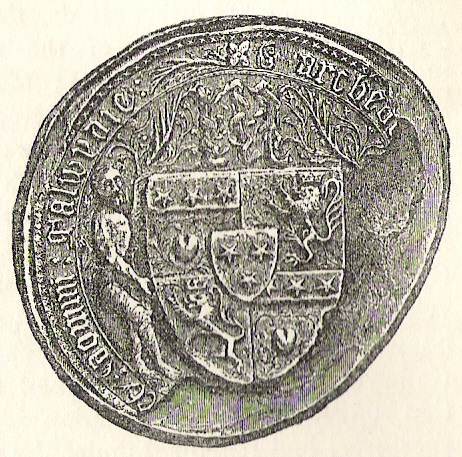
- Seal of Archibald Douglas
- Predecessor: James Douglas, 2nd Earl of Douglas
- Successor: Archibald Douglas, 4th Earl of Douglas
- Born: 1330; Scotland
- Died: 24 December 1400; Threave Castle
- Buried: 1400; Bothwell
- Noble family: Clan Douglas
- Spouses: Joanna de Moravia, Lady of Bothwell
- Issue: Archibald Douglas, 4th Earl of Douglas; James Douglas, 7th Earl of Douglas; Marjorie Douglas; Helen Douglas; Sir William Douglas of Nithsdale (illegitimate)
- Father: Sir James Douglas
- Mother: unknown

Archibald's coat of arms quartered the family arms of Douglas (featuring the famous Douglas heart) with the silver lion of the Lordship of Galloway. Upon marriage, he placed his wife's arms in an escutcheon of pretence

Archibald Douglas, Earl of Douglas and Wigtown, Lord of Galloway, Douglas and Bothwell (c. 1330 – c. 24 December 1400), called Archibald the Grim or Black Archibald, was a late medieval Scottish nobleman. Archibald was the illegitimate son of Sir James "the Black" Douglas, Robert the Bruce's trusted lieutenant, and an unknown mother. A first cousin of William Douglas, 1st Earl of Douglas, he inherited the earldom of Douglas and its entailed estates as the third earl following the death without legitimate issue of James, 2nd Earl of Douglas at the Battle of Otterburn.

== Early life ==
He was probably not yet born when his father went on crusade and was killed at the Battle of Teba whilst fighting the Moors. According to Walter Bower, possibly an insult regarding his illegitimacy, "He was dark and ugly more like a coco [cook-boy] than a Noble." Jean Froissart in his chronicle describes Douglas, as an adult, as a large man capable of wielding a huge sword. It has been suggested that the young Archibald spent time with his cousin William at the court in exile of King David II at Château Gaillard in Normandy. It was only natural for them to take service with the French king. This was in keeping with the spirit of the Auld Alliance. The first definite mention of him was in 1342 when his name was included as an heir to the Douglas lands after his legitimate Douglas cousins.

== Battle of Poitiers ==
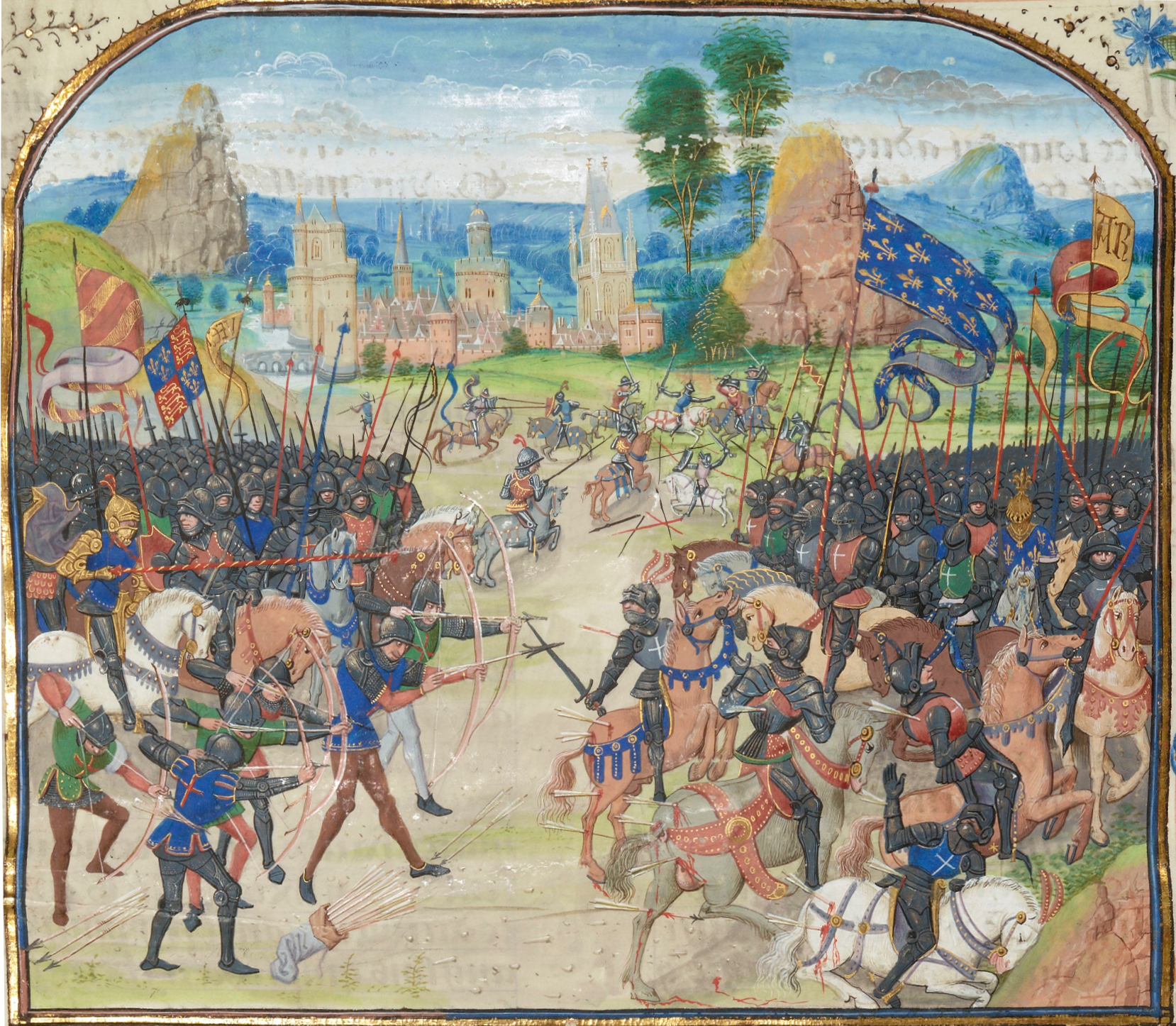
Battle of Poitiers

Archibald's first major appearance in history is recorded in 1356 at the Battle of Poitiers where he was captured by the English. Archibald had accompanied his cousin, William, Lord (later Earl) of Douglas, to serve John II of France in his wars against the Edward the Black Prince. Edward III of England had concluded truce negotiations with the Scots lasting from 25 March until Michaelmas, following the Burnt Candlemas of 2 February. During the truce, William Douglas had secured safe passage to travel to France, possibly to do penance for killing his cousin William Douglas of Liddesdale; amongst his entourage was the 26-year-old Archibald. Once in France, in the chivalric spirit of the age the Douglases joined the French army, to prevent their harnesses rusting through inactivity.

The battle was a disastrous defeat for the French. It was suggested by Froissart that part of the blame lay with the Lord of Douglas for his suggestion to the French king that his knights dismount and fight on foot. Whatever the cause, King John was captured along with many noblemen, including Black Archibald. Earl William evaded capture thanks to the determination of his entourage.

Archibald's armour and harness were of fine construction, and he was thought to be a valuable prisoner by his captors.

=== Escape ===
His escape from English hands in 1356 was aided by Sir William Ramsay of Colluthie, also a prisoner of the English. In the presence of one of the guards, Ramsay pretended to be furious with Archibald and accused him of the theft of his cousin's armour. Furthermore, he stated that his cousin had been felled by an English arrow and had died as a result of his lack of protection. Ramsay then insisted that Archibald take off his boots. Archibald concurred and by the time he had removed one, Ramsay started beating him around the head with it. One of the guards intervened, insisting that Archibald was the son of a great noble and should be respected.

Ramsay retorted, "Not he, I tell you, he is a scullion and a rogue", then to Archibald, "Go you rascal, and seek your master's body amongst the slain, so that we may at least give him a decent burial". Ramsay paid the fee of 40 shillings, the ransom rate for an esquire. Ramsay cuffed Archibald round the head once more and bade him begone. Archibald made his way back to Scotland, and deprived the Black Prince's army of what would have been a considerable ransom.

== Rise to prominence ==
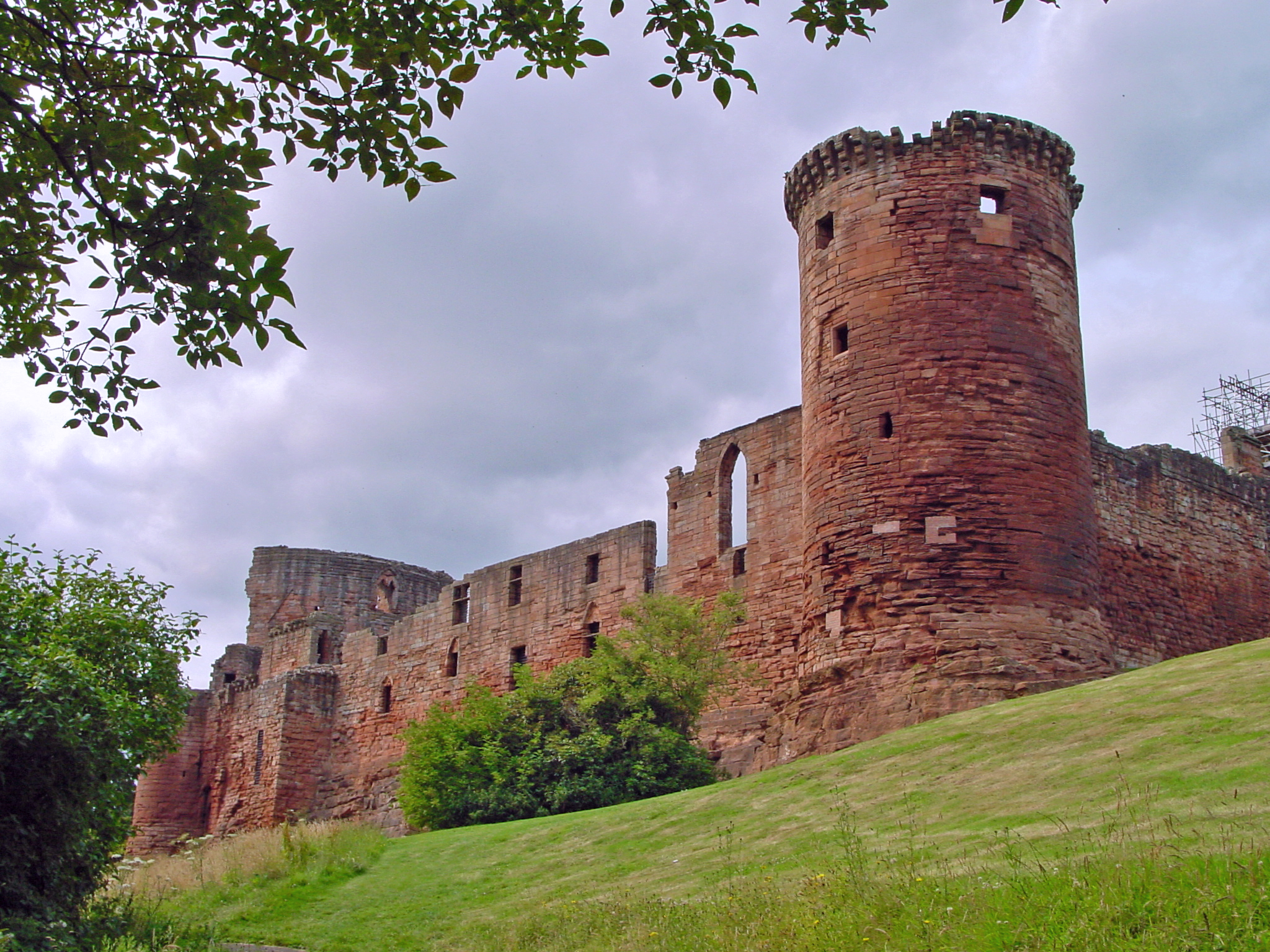
Bothwell Castle

Black Archibald was appointed Constable of Edinburgh Castle along with the office of Sheriff of Edinburgh by 1360, which offices he held until 1364. In that year, he was also appointed Warden of the Western March. This was an uneasy appointment, as the English held Annandale, which formed the greater part of his new jurisdiction.

In the following years, he carried out numerous raids against the English. In 1368, Douglas was appointed Lord Warden of the Marches and was successful in ousting the English from Annandale completely by 1383.

=== De Moravia marriage ===
Archibald further increased his power by his marriage to the widow and heiress Joanna de Moravia in 1362. Joanna de Moravia was the daughter of Maurice de Moravia, Earl of Strathearn and granddaughter of John de Moray of Drumsargard. Archibald is said to have offered to fight five English knights in single combat for her hand. The Lady of Bothwell and heiress to the de Moravia dynasty, Joanna brought with her large estates and lordships throughout Scotland, which Archibald claimed de jure uxoris. This included the semi-ruined Bothwell Castle, which he promptly started to rebuild. The marriage was a device of the king to ensure that the Moray inheritance would be passed into safe (and loyal) hands. Since the death of Joanna's first husband, Sir Thomas de Moravia, the Lord of Bothwell, in 1361, she and her widowed mother had been wards of the court. Joanna was declared to be not only heiress of her father's unentailed lands, but also those of her first husband. The estates stretched from Aberdeenshire, Moray and Ross in the north, to Lanarkshire and Roxburghshire in the south. Although Douglas did not inherit his wife's father's Earldom of Strathearn, Douglas would be able to use his newfound kindred ties to the advantage of the king in the centre of the kingdom.

=== Embassies ===
Archibald was sent on two embassies to France, in 1369 and 1371. The first of these was to protest against the appeal launched by the newly divorced Queen Margaret at the court in Avignon of Pope Urban V. The second embassy was to Paris, with a view to renewing the Auld Alliance. This embassy was ordered by the new Stewart king, Robert II, three days after his accession. The result of this diplomacy resulted in the Treaty of Vincennes, the first ratification of the alliance since the Treaty of Corbeil, 55 years before.

== Lord of Galloway ==
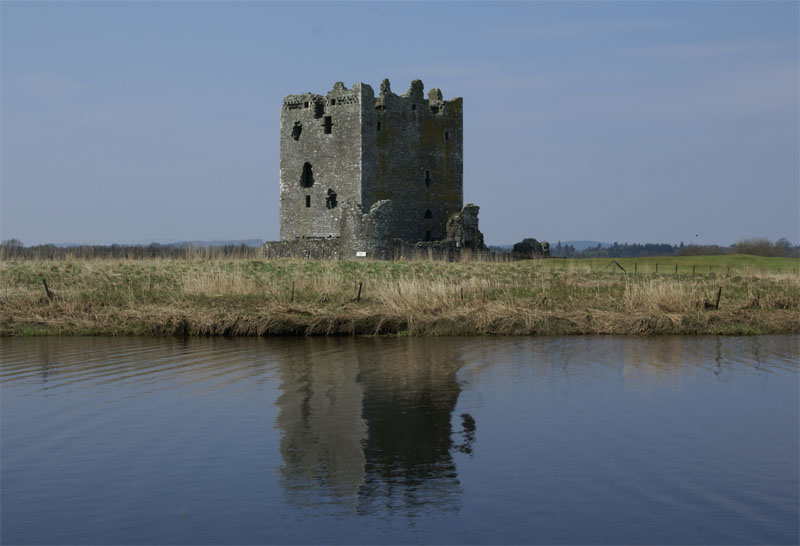
Threave Castle

In 1369, Archibald had been appointed Lord of Galloway by King David, "becaus he tuke git trawell to purge the cuntrey of Englis blude". Galloway was a difficult fiefdom to rule. Prior to his assumption of the title, it had been the patrimony of the Balliols, both the ousted king John Balliol and his pretender son Edward Balliol. The Balliols had inherited it through King John's mother Dervorguilla of Galloway, daughter and heiress of Alan, Lord of Galloway, the last of the Norse-Gaelic kings of Galloway. Galloway had distinctive laws and customs and, as with the Kingdom of the Isles, did not feel subservient to the Scottish crown, but rather to its ancient kings, of which the Balliols were seen as representing. In 1353, Earl William had succeeded in bringing the eastern part of the fiefdom under the control of the Scottish crown.

By 1372, after reaffirming control in the east, Archibald acquired the Earldom of Wigtown from Thomas Fleming, Earl of Wigtown, thus consolidating his power over the whole of Galloway, the first time under one man since 1234. This transfer of the earldom of Wigtown was ratified by Robert II on 7 November the same year. Archibald's conquest of Galloway was depicted on his seal, which depicts two "wild men" holding up his arms.

In 1378, Alexander Ramsay of Dalhousie, a nephew of Archibald Douglas, took Berwick by surprise with 50 men, and was immediately besieged by the town's governor Thomas de Musgrave. Douglas and Lord Lyndsay of the Byres assembled a relief army at Haddington, little more than 500 in number, but marched anyway, hoping to collect more men on the way. When Archibald's army approached Berwick, his scouts informed him that the English army around the castle numbered around 10,000, with archers, siege engines, heavy horse and ships blockading the river. Douglas then retreated to Melrose, followed by the English army. Just short of Melrose, Musgrave attacked. Fortunately Archibald's army had now been reinforced. During the ensuing Battle of Melrose, Musgrave was unhorsed and forced to yield for ransom. With Musgrave and other leaders captured, the remaining English not already slain fled back to Berwick with news of their defeat.

It is around this time that Archibald started work on his fortalice at Threave Castle, and endowed Sweetheart Abbey, near Dumfries, with a hospital. Rather than taking over Buittle, traditional seat of the Balliols during the construction of Threave, he took up residence at Kirkcudbright, traditional seat of the earlier lords.

In territorial possessions alone Archibald, Lord of Galloway appeared now to have matched, if not overtaken, his cousin William, 1st Earl of Douglas.

== Earl of Douglas ==
In 1384, William the first Earl of Douglas died of a seizure at Douglas, and was succeeded by his son James Douglas, 2nd Earl of Douglas, who was killed during his victorious Battle of Otterburn four years later in 1388. Archibald inherited his cousin's earldom and all the entailed Douglas lands, making him the most powerful magnate in Scotland.

During the intervals of war with the English, he imposed feudal law on the border chieftains, drawing up a special code for the marches. The power of the Black Douglas overshadowed the crown under the weak rule of Robert III. Archibald appeared to have strengthened his line's connection with that of the Royal Stewarts, when in 1390 he arranged the marriage of his son and heir, Archibald, Master of Douglas, to Princess Margaret, and in 1399 his daughter Marjorie to David Stewart, Duke of Rothesay; both of these spouses were children of Robert III, Rothesay being the heir apparent to the throne. Rothesay had already contracted to marry Elizabeth Dunbar, daughter of George I, Earl of March, who had paid a large sum for the honour. March, alienated by this breach of faith on the king's part, joined the English forces.

In 1390 he captured Lochnaw Castle.

== Death ==
The Earl of Douglas died at Threave Castle, around the Christmas of 1400, and was buried at Bothwell.

== Marriage and children ==
Around 1362 Douglas married Joanna de Moravia, daughter of Maurice de Moravia, 1st Earl of Strathearn. They had five children:

- Archibald Douglas, who succeeded as 4th earl
- James Douglas, later the 7th earl
- Marjorie Douglas, married 1st David Stewart, Duke of Rothesay, 2nd Walter de Haliburton the Treasurer of Scotland
- Helen, married George de Lawedre of Haltoun, Governor of Edinburgh Castle.
- Eleanor Douglas, married John de Dundas

Lord Douglas had an illegitimate son:

- Sir William Douglas of Nithsdale (assassinated 1391), married Egidia Stewart daughter of Robert II and his second wife Euphemia de Ross.

Peerage of Scotland
Preceded by James Douglas	Earl of Douglas; 1388–1400	Succeeded by Archibald Douglas
