= List of Scottish royal consorts =

The consorts of the monarchs of Scotland, such as queens consort, princesses consort, and kings consort, bore titles derived from their marriage. The Kingdom of Scotland was first unified as a state by Kenneth I of Scotland in 843, and ceased to exist as an independent kingdom after the Act of Union 1707 when it was merged with the Kingdom of England to become the Kingdom of Great Britain.

The early history of Scotland is confused and often obscure, due largely to information given by the sources of the time and after, which are often contradictory, vague, and lacking in detail. Details of the kings prior to Malcolm III are sparse, and the status of two – Giric and Eochaid – dubious; details of their wives are almost non-existent. Thus, it is practically impossible to construct a list of consorts of Scotland prior to the accession of Macbeth, whose wife Gruoch is well-documented.

== House of Moray ==
Although a few details of earlier queens consort are known — for example, Duncan I was married to a woman named in one source as Suthen — the first queen about whom much is known is Gruoch who reigned until 1057. Gruoch was a daughter of Boite mac Cináeda, himself a son of either Kenneth II or Kenneth III, and she was the wife of Macbeth, with whom she had a son named Lulach. Later, the mother of Máel Snechtai, Lulach's son, was still alive in 1078, when she was seized by Malcolm Canmore, but nothing else is known of her, not even if she and Lulach were married.

Picture	Name	Father (House)	Birth	Marriage	Became consort	Coronation	Ceased to be consort	Death	Spouse
	Gruoch of Scotland	Boite mac Cináeda (MacAlpin)	c. 1015 (presumed)	c. 1032	c. 14 August 1040	–	15 August 1057	c. 1060 (presumed)	Macbeth

== House of Dunkeld (1058–1286) ==
In 1058, Malcolm Long-neck of the House of Dunkeld overthrew his cousin, Lulach, and reclaimed the Scottish throne for himself. His family, the House of Dunkeld, would rule until the death of Alexander III in 1286, with whom the House ended. Alexander's heir was his infant granddaughter, Margaret, "the Maid of Norway", of the House of Fairhair; but she died, still unmarried and childless, in late 1290 before reaching Scotland, and was never crowned at Scone. After a two year interregnum, the controversial John de Balliol was chosen as king (his wife was already dead, and thus never became queen consort); but after a reign of only four years, he abdicated, and Scotland entered another Interregnum until 1306.

Picture	Name	Father (House)	Birth	Marriage	Became Consort	Coronation	Ceased to be Consort	Death	Spouse
	Ingibiorg Finnsdottir	Finn Arnesson	?	1058		–	1069		Malcolm III
	Margaret of Wessex	Edward the Exile (Wessex)	c. 1045	1070		–	13 November 1093	16 November 1093	Malcolm III
	Ethelreda of Northumbria	Gospatric, Earl of Northumbria	?	1093/94		–	1094	?	Duncan II
	Sybilla of Normandy	Henry I of England (Normandy)	1092	1107		–	12/13 July 1122		Alexander I
	Maud of Northumbria	Waltheof II, Earl of Northumbria	1072	1113	23 April 1124	April/May 1124	23 April 1130		David I
	Ermengarde de Beaumont	Richard I, Viscount de Beaumont (House of Beaumont)	c. 1170	5 September 1186		–	4 December 1214	12 February 1233/34	William I
	Joan of England	John of England (Plantagenet)	22 July 1210	21 June 1221		–	4 March 1238		Alexander II
	Marie de Coucy	Enguerrand III, Lord of Coucy (Coucy)	c. 1218	15 May 1239		–	6 July 1249	1285	Alexander II
	Margaret of England	Henry III of England (Plantagenet)	29 September 1240	26 December 1251		–	26 February 1275		Alexander III
	Yolande de Dreux	Robert IV, Count of Dreux (Dreux)	20 March 1263	15 October 1285		–	19 March 1286	2 August 1330	Alexander III

== House of Bruce (1306–1371) (Bruis) ==
In 1306, Robert the Bruce and his wife, Elizabeth de Burgh, were crowned King and Queen of Scots at Scone, ending the Scottish interregnum. The Bruce family would rule until the death of David II in 1371.

Picture	Name	Father (House)	Birth	Marriage	Became consort	Coronation	Ceased to be consort	Death	Spouse
	Elizabeth de Burgh	Richard Óg de Burgh, 2nd Earl of Ulster (de Burgh)	c. 1289	1302	25 March 1306	27 March 1306	27 October 1327		Robert I
	Joan of England	Edward II of England (Plantagenet)	5 July 1321	17 July 1328	7 June 1329	November 1331	7 September 1362		David II
	Margaret Drummond	Sir Malcolm Drummond (Drummond)	c. 1340	20 February 1364			20 March 1369; Divorced by husband	31 January 1375	David II

== House of Stewart (1371–1707) (Gælic: Stiubhart) ==
=== Direct line (1371–1542) ===
Upon the death of David II in 1371, his nephew, Robert Stewart (the son of Walter Stewart and Marjorie Bruce, herself the daughter of Robert I by his first marriage) acceded to the throne. His direct line of heirs would continue to rule until the death of his last direct male descendant, James V. James left only a six-day-old girl as his heir, prompting his angry exclamation, "The devil go with it! [The rule of the Stewarts] will end as it began. It came with a lass, and it will pass with a lass." In this he was wrong: Mary would marry a member of a junior branch of the Stewart family, and the line they founded would rule not only Scotland but also England and Ireland until 1714. However, the final Stewart monarch was a woman, Anne, Queen of Great Britain.

Picture	Arms	Name	Father (House)	Birth	Marriage	Became consort	Coronation	Ceased to be consort	Death	Spouse
		Euphemia de Ross	Aodh, Earl of Ross (Ross)	before 1333	2 May 1355	22 February 1371	1372 or 1373	c. 1389		Robert II
		Annabella Drummond	John Drummond, 11th Thane of Lennox (Drummond)	c. 1350	1367	19 April 1390	15 August 1390	1401		Robert III
		Joan Beaufort	John Beaufort, 1st Earl of Somerset (Beaufort)	c. 1404	2 February 1424		21 May 1424	21 February 1437	15 July 1445	James I
		Mary of Guelders	Arnold, Duke of Guelders (Egmond)	c. 1434	3 July 1449			3 August 1460	1 December 1463	James II
		Margaret of Denmark	Christian I of Denmark (Oldenburg)	23 June 1456	July 1469			before 14 July 1486		James III
		Margaret of England	Henry VII of England (Tudor)	28 November 1489	25 January 1502 (by proxy); 8 August 1503		8 August 1503	9 September 1513	18 October 1541	James IV
		Madeleine of Valois	Francis I of France (Valois)	10 August 1520	1 January 1537			7 July 1537		James V
		Mary of Guise	Claude, Duke of Guise (Guise)	22 November 1515	18 May 1538		22 February 1540	14 December 1542	11 June 1560	James V

=== House of Stuart (1542–1649) ===
In 1542, James V died, leaving his daughter Mary as Queen of Scots. Mary was later sent by her mother to the French court, where her surname was gallicised to Stuart. Mary married Henry Stuart, Lord Darnley, a member of a junior branch of the Stewart family (who had also gallicised their surname to Stuart). Their son, James VI, established the Stuart dynasty, which would rule not only Scotland but also, from 1603, England and Ireland. The rule of this house was briefly terminated with the Civil War, in which Charles I was executed and the Commonwealth declared; thus, between 1649 and 1660, England, Scotland and Ireland were ruled by Parliament, dominated by Oliver Cromwell. The House would be restored to the throne in 1660, with the return of Charles II.

Picture	Arms	Name	Father (House)	Birth	Marriage	Became consort	Coronation	Ceased to be consort	Death	Spouse
		Francis II of France	Henry II of France (Valois)	19 January 1544	24 April 1558			5 December 1560		Mary I
		Henry Stuart, Duke of Albany	Matthew Stewart, 4th Earl of Lennox (Stuart)	7 December 1545	29 July 1565			9/10 February 1567		Mary I
		James Hepburn, Duke of Orkney	Patrick Hepburn, 3rd Earl of Bothwell (Hepburn)	c. 1534	15 May 1567			24 July 1567; Wife's abdication	14 April 1578	Mary I
		Anne of Denmark	Frederick II of Denmark (Oldenburg)	12 December 1574	23 November 1589		17 May 1590	2 March 1619		James VI
		Henrietta Maria of France	Henry IV of France (Bourbon)	25 November 1609	13 June 1625			30 January 1649 husband's execution	10 September 1669	Charles I

=== House of Stuart (restored) (1660–1707) ===
In 1660, Charles II, son of the executed Charles I, was restored to the thrones of England, Scotland and Ireland, and Stuart rule began again. James VII, his brother, was overthrown in 1688–89 because of his Catholic faith; his daughters, Mary II and Anne, were the last Stuarts to rule in the British Isles, Anne dying in 1714. The Kingdom of Scotland, however, had already ceased to exist in 1707, when the Act of Union amalgamated the Kingdoms of England and Scotland into a united Kingdom of Great Britain. James VII's son, James Francis Edward Stuart, refusing to accept the Act of Union, claimed the English and Scottish thrones, as did his son Charles Edward Stuart; however, they are not considered legitimate Kings of Scotland, since they never effectively secured their claims, and so their wives are not listed here.

Picture	Name	Father (House)	Birth	Marriage	Became Consort	Coronation	Ceased to be Consort	Death	Spouse
	Catherine of Braganza	John IV of Portugal (Braganza)	25 November 1638	21 May 1662			6 February 1685	31 December 1705	Charles II
	Mary of Modena	Alfonso IV d'Este, Duke of Modena (Este)	5 October 1658	30 September 1673	6 February 1685	23 April 1685	11 December 1688	7 May 1718	James VII
	George of Denmark	Frederick III of Denmark (Oldenburg)	2 April 1653	28 July 1683	8 March 1702		1 May 1707; Kingdoms of Scotland and England amalgamated; Anne becomes Queen regnant of the Kingdom of Great Britain, George royal consort of the same	28 October 1708	Anne

- For the subsequent consorts of Great Britain and the United Kingdom, see List of British consorts.

== See also ==
- List of Scottish monarchs
- List of Scottish royal mistresses
