= Elizabeth Crawford (disambiguation) =

Elizabeth Crawford may refer to:

- Elizabeth Crawford (born 1959), American painter
- Elizabeth Crawford (historian), British suffrage researcher
- Elizabeth Stewart, Countess of Crawford, 14th-century Scottish princess
