= Henry I Sinclair, Earl of Orkney =

Scottish and Norwegian nobleman, 14th century

Henry Sinclair
- Earl of Orkney; Baron of Roslin
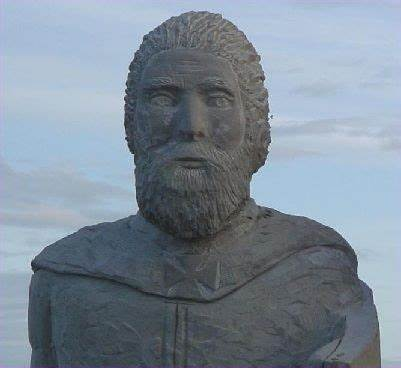
- (Top) Earl of Orkney and Baron of Roslin Coats of Arms. (Bottom) Statue of Henry Sinclair in the compound of the Noss Head Lighthouse by sculptor Shawn Williamson.
- Predecessor: Earldom of Orkney: Vacant; Baron of Roslin: William St Clair
- Successor: Henry II Sinclair, Earl of Orkney
- Known for: The legend of him discovering North America 100 years before Christopher Columbus.
- Born: c. 1345
- Died: c. 1400
- Offices: Lord High Admiral of Scotland
- Noble family: Clan Sinclair
- Spouse: Jean Haliburton
- Father: Sir William St Clair, 8th Baron of Roslin
- Mother: Isabella (Isobel) of Strathearn

Henry I Sinclair, Earl of Orkney, Lord of Roslin (c. 1345 – c. 1400) was a Scottish nobleman. Sinclair held the title Earl of Orkney (which refers to Norðreyjar rather than just the islands of Orkney) and was Lord High Admiral of Scotland under the King of Scotland. He was sometimes identified by another spelling of his surname, St. Clair. He was the grandfather of William Sinclair, 1st Earl of Caithness, the builder of Rosslyn Chapel. He is best known today because of a modern legend that he took part in explorations of Greenland and North America almost 100 years before Christopher Columbus. William Thomson, in his book The New History of Orkney, wrote: "It has been Earl Henry's singular fate to enjoy an ever-expanding posthumous reputation which has very little to do with anything he achieved in his lifetime."

== Biography ==
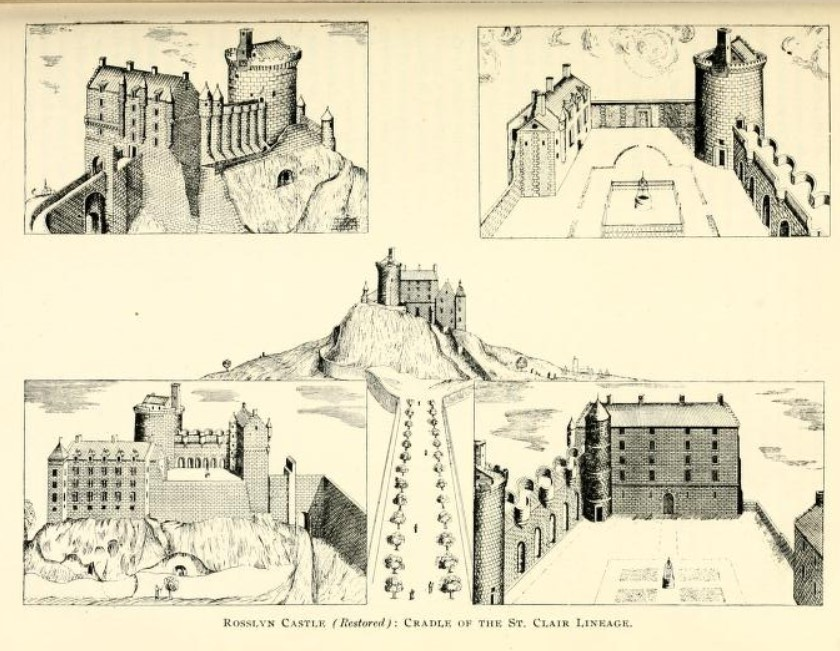
Rosslyn or Roslin Castle, seat of the Sinclairs who were Barons of Roslin, reconstruction image

Henry Sinclair was the son and heir of Sir William Sinclair, Lord of Roslin, and his wife Isabella (Isobel) of Strathearn. She was a daughter of Maol Ísa, Jarl of Orkney. Henry Sinclair's maternal grandfather had been deprived of much of his lands (the earldom of Strathearn being completely lost to the King of Scots).

Sometime after 13 September 1358, Henry's father died, at which point Henry Sinclair succeeded as the 9th Baron of Roslin, Pentland and Cousland, a group of minor properties in Lothian.

Although the Norwegian Jarldom of Orkney was not an inheritable position, successive appointments had operated as if it had been. After a vacancy lasting 18 years, three cousins – Alexander de L'Arde, Lord of Caithness; Malise Sparre, Lord of Skaldale; and Henry Sinclair – were rivals for the succession. Initially trialing de L'Arde as Captain of Orkney, King Haakon VI of Norway was quickly disappointed in de L'Arde's behaviour, and sacked him.

On 2 August 1379, at Marstrand, near Tønsberg, Norway, Haakon chose Sinclair over Sparre, investing Sinclair with the Jarldom or Earldom in the Peerage of Scotland. In return Henry pledged to pay a fee of 1000 nobles before St. Martin's Day (11 November), and, when called upon, serve the king on Orkney or elsewhere with 100 fully armed men for 3 months. It is unknown if Haakon VI ever attempted to call upon the troops pledged by Henry or if any of the fee was actually paid.

As security for upholding the agreement the new jarl left hostages behind when he departed Norway for Orkney. Shortly before his death in summer 1380, the king permitted the hostages to return home. In 1389, Sinclair attended the hailing of King Eric in Norway, pledging his oath of fealty. Historians have speculated that in 1391 Sinclair and his troops slew Malise Sparre near Scalloway, Tingwall parish, Shetland.

Sinclair is later described as an "admiral of the seas" in the Genealogies of the Saintclaires of Roslin by Richard Augustine Hay. This refers to his position as the Lord High Admiral of Scotland while in service to the King of Scotland. It is a title he is said to have inherited from his father William Sinclair in 1358 but it's more likely he acquired it much later in life.

It is not known when Henry Sinclair died. The Sinclair Diploma, written or at least commissioned by his grandson states: "...he retirit to the parts of Orchadie and josit them to the latter tyme of his life, and deit Erile of Orchadie, and for the defence of the country was slain there cruellie by his enemiis..." We also know that sometime in 1401: "The English invaded, burnt and spoiled certain islands of Orkney." This was part of an English retaliation for a Scottish attack on an English fleet near Aberdeen. The assumption is that Henry either died opposing this invasion, or was already dead.

Henri Santo Claro (Henry St. Clair) signed a charter from King Robert III in January 1404. It is supposed that he died shortly after that although his son did not take the title until 1412. Therefore, he died somewhere between 1404 and 1412, killed in an attack on Orkney, possibly by English seamen. Or in an attack from the south.

According to Sir Robert Douglas, 6th Baronet, Sinclair had received the honours of the Orders of the Thistle, Saint Michael (Cockle) and the Golden Fleece. However all these orders were created after Sinclair's death.

== Marriage and issue ==
Henry I Sinclair, Earl of Orkney, married Jean Haliburton, daughter of Sir John Haliburton of Dirleton (d. 1392) by his wife Margaret Cameron and sister of Sir Walter de Haliburton, 1st Lord Haliburton of Dirleton, and had issue:

1. Henry II Sinclair, Earl of Orkney (c. 1375–1422), married Egidia Douglas, daughter of Sir William Douglas of Nithsdale and his wife Egidia Stewart, daughter of King Robert II of Scotland and second wife Euphemia de Ross
2. John Sinclair, said to have married Ingeborg, a natural daughter of Waldemar IV, King of Denmark
3. William Sinclair
4. Elizabeth Sinclair (1363-?), married Sir John Drummond of Cargill and Stobhall, Thane of Lennox, Chief of Clan Drummond (Drymen, Stirlingshire, 1356-1428), Justiciar of Scotia, brother of Annabella Drummond and son of Sir John Drummond of Stobhall, near Perth (1318-1373), Thane of Lennox, Chief of Clan Drummond, Baillie of the Abthainy of Dull, who in February 1367 had a charter of his wife's lands, and wife Mary de Montifex or Montfichet (b. 1325), eldest daughter and co-heiress of Sir William de Montifex or Montfichet of Auchterarder, of Stobhall and of Cargill, Justiciar of Scotland before 1328, paternal granddaughter of Sir Malcolm Drummond (aft. 1295-Battle of Neville's Cross, Durham, 17 October 1346), Thane of Lennox,Chief of Clan Drummond, and great-granddaughter of Sir Malcolm Drummond (aft. 1270-1325), Thane of Lennox, Chief of Clan Drummond, who fought in the Battle of Dunbar in 1296, where he was captured by the English, and in 1301 was again captured by the English, and in the Battle of Bannockburn in 1314, and wife ... de Graham, daughter of Sir Patrick de Graham of Kincardine and wife Annabella of Strathearn, and had issue:
  1. Sir Walter Drummond of Cargill and Stobhall (?-1455), Chief of Clan Drummond, married Margaret Ruthven, daughter of Sir William Ruthven of that Ilk and wife, and had issue:
    1. Sir Malcolm Drummond of Cargill and Stobhall (?-1470), Chief of Clan Drummond, married in 1445 Mariot or Mariota Murray, daughter of Sir David Murray of Tullibardine and wife Margaret Colquhoun, and had issue
      1. James Drummond of Coldoch, Chief of Clan Drummond, married and had female issue
      2. John Drummond, 1st Lord Drummond (d. 1519), Chief of Clan Drummond
    2. John Drummond
    3. Margaret Drummond (?-aft. 26 March 1482), married Andrew Mercer of Meikleour and Aldie (?-1473), son of Michael Mercer (c. 1378-c. 1440) and wife Elizabeth Stewart, daughter of Sir Robert Stewart of Durrisdeer and wife Janet Macdougall, and had issue
    4. Walter Drummond, 1st of Ledcrieff (?-aft. 1486), married and had issue
  2. John Drummond, who has been suggested, based on a reported deathbed confession, to be João Escórcio (John the Scotsman), a high ranking official in 15th century Madeira, Portugal, who hid his identity, and the progenitor of people bearing the surnames of Escórcio and Drummond in Madeira (the latter recognised by the gift of armorial bearings by Clan Drummond in 1519), though John Drummond being João Escórcio cannot be established beyond doubt. Born between 1395 and 1400 and died between 1460 and 1470, he was a Knight who in 1418 was in France with the Dauphin Charles VII against the English; in 1427 he went to Castille, Spain, where he fought alongside John II of Castile, ending up settling in Madeira, Portugal; in 1430 he obtained a land grant on the island of Madeira, where he married c. 1440 Branca Afonso, born in Covilhã, sister of the first vicar of Santa Cruz in Madeira Frei Hércules da Cunha, and had issue, soon extinct in male line. In 1519, and even later (1604, 1634), some descendants of João Escórcio established correspondence with members of the Drummond family of Stobhall, exchanging letters, some written in Latin. They are published in the book "The Genealogy of the Most Noble and Ancient House of Drummond", published in Edinburgh in 1831 and translated and published in Volume III of the Madeira Historical Archive. In these letters, the Drummonds of Scotland confirm that a son of Lord Drummond, brother of Queen Arabella, went to France in the 1420s in search of honor and fame, with his family no longer hearing anything about him.
5. Margaret Sinclair, married James of Cragy, Laird of Hupe in Orkney
6. Marjory Sinclair, married David Menzies of that Ilk, and Weem
7. Bethoc Sinclair, married William Borthwick of that Ilk
8. Katherine Sinclair (1358-1430), married John Seton, 2nd Lord Seton, and had issue

== Fringe theories ==
In the 1980s, modern alternative histories of Earl Henry I Sinclair and Rosslyn Chapel began to be published. Popular books (often described as pseudo-historical) such as The Holy Blood and the Holy Grail by Michael Baigent, Richard Leigh and Henry Lincoln (1982) and The Temple and the Lodge by Michael Baigent and Richard Leigh (1989) appeared. Books by Timothy Wallace-Murphy and Andrew Sinclair soon followed from the early 1990s onwards.

=== The alleged voyage to North America ===
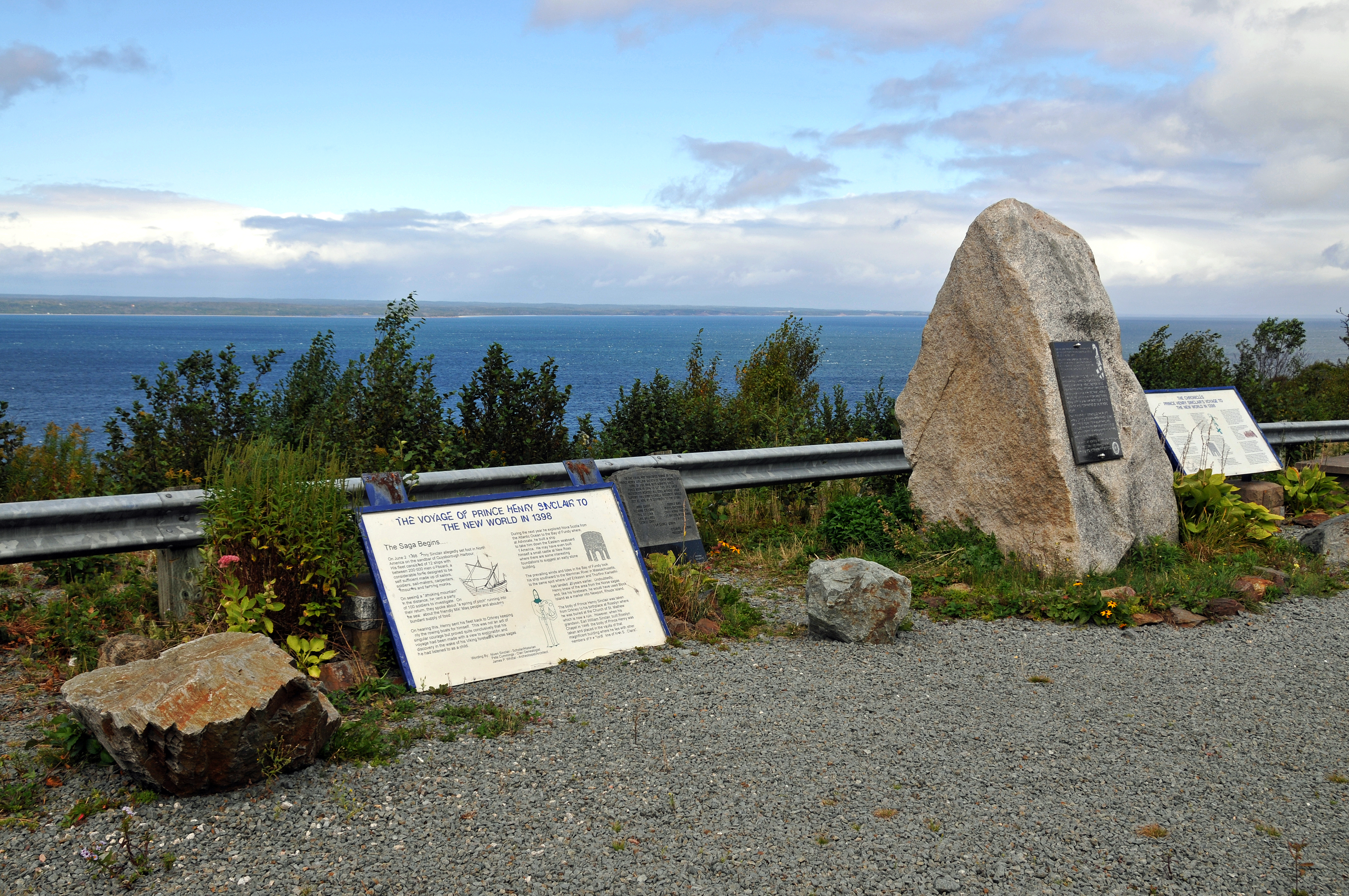
Monument to the alleged landing site of the Sinclair Expedition, Guysborough, Nova Scotia

One of the most common theories about Sinclair is that he was one of the first Europeans to visit North America in a voyage pre-dating Columbus. In 1784, he was identified by Johann Reinhold Forster as possibly being the Prince Zichmni described in letters allegedly written around the year 1400 by the Zeno brothers of Venice, in which they describe a voyage throughout the North Atlantic under the command of Zichmni. There is no evidence for Nicolò spending any time in the North Atlantic; the historical evidence shows him in Venetian public service.

The letters and the accompanying map, allegedly rediscovered and published in the early 16th century, are regarded by most historians as a hoax by the Zenos or their publishers. Moreover, the identification of Zichmni as Henry Sinclair has not been accepted by most historians, although this identification and their overall authenticity are taken for granted by the supporters of the theory.

The claim that Henry Sinclair explored North America has been popularised by several other authors, notably by Frederick J. Pohl, Andrew Sinclair, Michael Bradley, William S. Crooker (who claimed to have discovered Henry Sinclair's castle in Nova Scotia), Steven Sora, and more recently by David Goudsward.

Brian Smith writes that "Pohl believed just about everything that the seventeenth century antiquarians said about Henry, however foolish." He dismissed Pohl's hypothesis that the name of the Mi'kmaq mythological figure Glooscap derived from “Jarl Sinclair” as being phonetically implausible.

Andrew Sinclair, a direct descendant of Henry, described him as a crusader, a gnostic, a knight templar and a freemason but there is no evidence for these descriptions.

The claim requires the acceptance not only that the letters and map ascribed to the Zeno brothers and published in 1558 are authentic, but that the voyage described in the letters as taken by Zichmni around the year 1398 to Greenland actually reached North America and that Zichmni is Henry Sinclair. It is also bolstered by claims that carvings in Rosslyn Chapel represent American plants.

The name "Zichmni" is either totally fictitious, or quite possibly a transliteration error when converting from handwritten materials to type. Forster tried to relate this to the name "Sinclair". In 1950 Pohl wrote that "Zichmni" was a misreading of "Siclair" or "Siclaro" while in 1970 that it was a mistranscription of the title "d'Orkney", which he wrote had a "certain inevitability".

One primary criticism of this theory is that if either a Sinclair or a Templar voyage reached the Americas, they did not, unlike Columbus, return with a historical record of their findings. In fact, there is no known published documentation from that era to support the theory that such a voyage took place. The physical evidence relies on speculative reasoning to support the theory, and all of it can be interpreted in other ways. For example, according to one historian, the carvings in Rosslyn Chapel are not of American plants but are nothing more than stylised carvings of wheat and strawberries.

=== Alleged Templar connections ===
Intertwined with the Sinclair voyage story is the claim that Henry Sinclair was a Knight Templar and that the voyage either was sponsored by or conducted on the behalf of the Templars, though the order was suppressed almost half a century before Henry's lifetime.

Christopher Knight & Robert Lomas have speculated that the Knights Templar discovered under the Temple Mount in Jerusalem a royal archive dating from King Solomon's times that stated that Phoenicians from Tyre voyaged to a westerly continent following a star called "La Merika" named after the Nasoraean Mandaean morning star. According to Knight and Lomas, the Templars learned that to sail to that continent, they had to follow a star by the same name. Sinclair supposedly followed this route.

According to Lomas, the Sinclairs and their French relatives, the St. Clairs, were instrumental in creating the Knights Templar. He claims that the founder of Templars Hugues de Payens was married to a sister of the Duke of Champaine (Henri de St. Clair), who was a powerful broker of the First Crusade and had the political power to nominate the Pope, and to suggest the idea and empower it to the Pope.

A biography of Hughes de Payens by Thierry Leroy identifies his wife and the mother of his children as Elizabeth de Chappes. The book draws its information on the marriage from local church cartularies dealing chiefly with the disposition of the Grand Master's properties, the earliest alluding to Elizabeth as his wife in 1113, and others spanning de Payens’ lifetime, the period following his death and lastly her own death in 1170.

Historians Mark Oxbrow, Ian Robertson, Karen Ralls and Louise Yeoman have each made it clear that the Sinclair family had no connection with the mediaeval Knights Templar. Karen Ralls has shown that among those testifying against the Templars at their 1309 trial were Henry and William Sinclair – an act inconsistent with any alleged support or membership.

== See also ==
- Zeno map
- Zeno brothers
- Westford Knight
- Knights Templar legends#Discoverers of the New World
- Barony of Roslin
- Lord Sinclair
- Earl of Caithness
- Lord Herdmanston

Peerage of Scotland
Preceded by Erengisle Sunesson	Jarl of Orkney; 1379–1401	Succeeded by Henry Sinclair
Preceded by William St Clair	Barony of Roslin; 1358–1400	Succeeded by Henry Sinclair
Military offices
Unknown	Lord High Admiral of Scotland ?–1404	Succeeded by George Crichton, 1st Earl of Caithness
