= Elizabeth Stewart, Countess of Crawford =

14th-century Scottish princess

Elizabeth of Scotland
- Spouse: David Lindsay, 1st Earl of Crawford
- Father: Robert II of Scotland
- Mother: Euphemia de Ross

Elizabeth Stewart, Princess of Scotland was the daughter of Robert II of Scotland and Euphemia de Ross.

Elizabeth was born between 1356 and 1370, well after her parents' marriage on 2 May 1355.

Her brothers were David Stewart, Earl of Strathearn and Walter Stewart, Earl of Atholl, and her half-brother was Robert III of Scotland. Her sister was Egidia Stewart, who married William Douglas of Nithsdale.

She married David Lindsay, 1st Earl of Crawford on 22 February 1375. Her dowry was the barony of Strathnairn in Inverness-shire. In 1398, her father granted Lindsay the title of 1st Earl of Crawford. Elizabeth was styled as Countess of Crawford following the grant.

They had seven, possibly eight, children:

- Gerard Lindsay (d. before 1421)
- Ingram Lindsay, Bishop of Aberdeen (d. 1458)
- Marjorie Lindsay, married Sir William Douglas. They were parents of Catherine Douglas, the Scottish noblewoman who tried to prevent the assassination of King James I of Scotland in 1437.
- Alexander Lindsay, 2nd Earl of Crawford (c. 1387–1438); married Marjory of Dunbar and had issue.
- David Lindsay, Lord of Newdosk (1407–?); he became a priest.
- Elizabeth Lindsay; she married Sir Robert Keith.
- Elizabeth Lindsay (1407–?); married Robert Erskine, 1st Lord Erskine; she may have been confused with her sister of the same name, and it is possible that they were one and the same person.
- Isabella Lindsay (1407–?), married Sir John Maxwell of Pollok, and had issue.

They presumably lived at Crawford Castle.
