= List of Scottish royal mistresses =

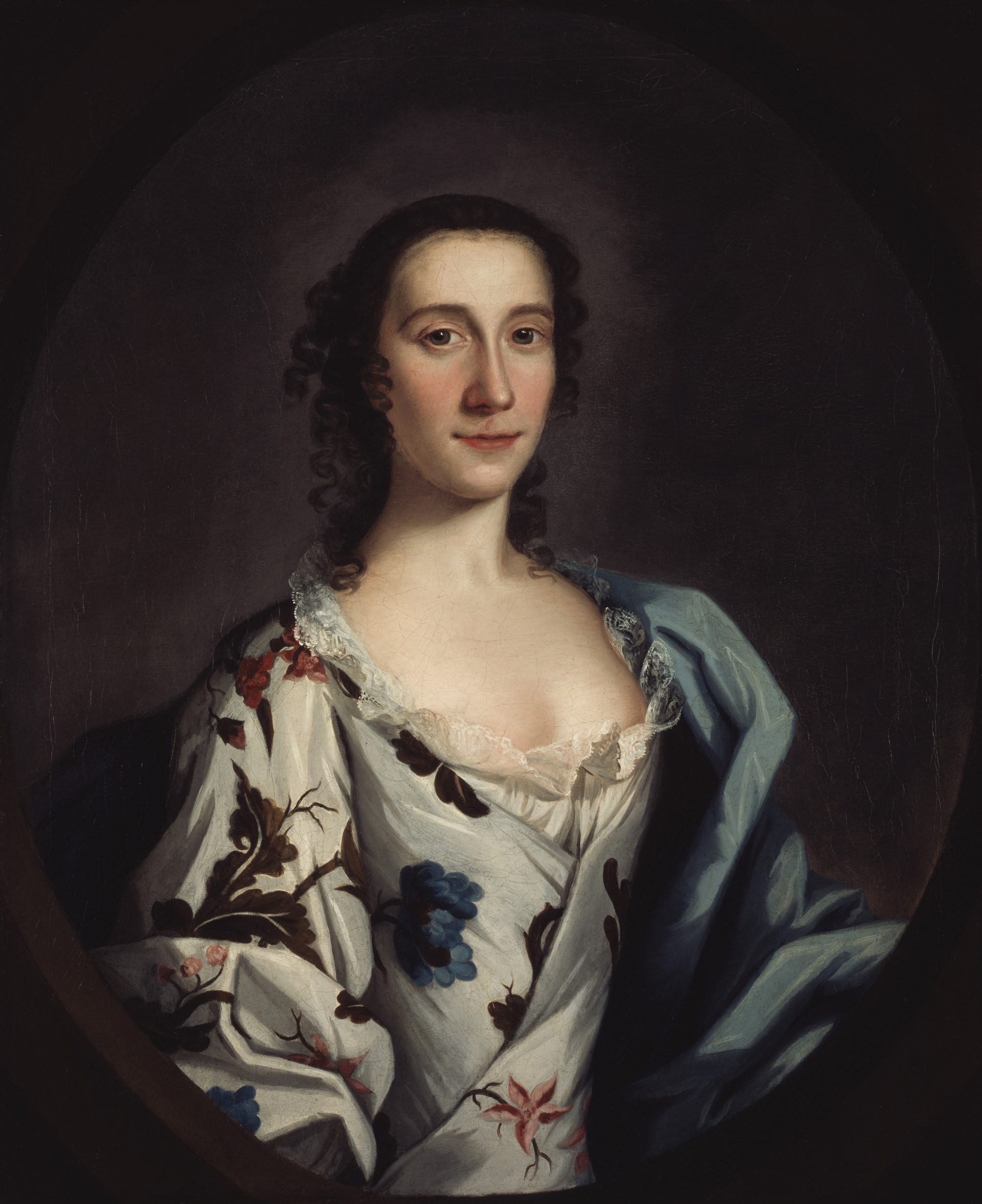
Portrait of Clementina Walkinshaw, mistress to Charles Edward Stuart

This article contains a list of notable Scottish royal mistresses. The list cannot be complete since some earlier kings had illegitimate children by unknown mothers.

== David II ==
- 1360s: Agnes Dunbar
- 1361/2 until their marriage in 1364: Margaret Drummond

== Robert II ==
- 1330s: Elizabeth Mure

== James IV ==
- 1490s: Marion Boyd
- 1490s: Margaret Drummond
- 1497-1503: Janet Kennedy
- Isabel Stewart of Buchan

== James V of Scotland ==
- 1520s: Margaret Erskine, mother of James Stewart, 1st Earl of Moray
- 1530s: Euphemia Elphinstone, mother of Robert Stewart, 1st Earl of Orkney
- 1530s: Elizabeth Beaton/Bethune, mother of Lady Jean Stewart

== James VI of Scotland ==
- 1590s: Anne Murray, Countess of Kinghorne

== Prince Charles Edward Stuart ==
- 1740s: Jean Cameron
- 1750s: Clementina Walkinshaw, mother of Charlotte Stuart, Duchess of Albany

== See also ==
- List of English royal mistresses
- List of Swedish royal mistresses
