= Alexander Lindsay of Glenesk =

14th-century noble

Arms of Alexander Lindsay of Glenesk: Gules a Fess chequy Argent and Azure in sinister chief a Mullet of six points Argent.

Sir Alexander Lindsay of Glenesk (died 1381) was a Scottish knight banneret. Active in jousting and as a crusader he was in favour with the Scottish kings David II and Robert II.

== Biography ==
Lindsay was the second surviving son to Sir David de Lindsay of Crawford and the Byres, and Mary Abernethy, widow of Andre de Leschelyn (Leslie), and a daughter and co-heiress of Alexander de Abernethy. Lindsay's father had been Constable of Edinburgh Castle and Berwick and active during the Wars of Independence.

Lindsay was esquire to his cousin Thomas Stewart, 2nd Earl of Angus. Lindsay inherited his mother's lands in Angus, and also acquired some of the baronies allotted to his aunt Marget Aberhethy, Countess of Angus. Upon his marriage to Catherine Stirling around 1358, he consolidated his already large maternal inheritance, with that of his wife, which would add to the extensive landholdings of the Earldom of Crawford in north-east Scotland and elsewhere.

Lindsay was knighted before 1368, He was party to a truce with England as "Chevalier et Baron" in 1369. He sealed with his nephew the settlements of the Crown (1371–1373) and was Justiciary in the North possibly as early of 1371 but definitely by 1373.

He had many safe-conducts from the English kings Edward III and Richard II, and in December 1381, he obtained a passport to travel through England on a pilgrimage to the Holy Land. He died on Crete some time before March 1382.

== Family ==
Lindsay married Catherine Stirling (died by 1378), widow of Andrew Leslie of that Ilk and daughter to John Stirling of Glenesk. (Note: or John Stirling of Edzell (Paul 1906, p. 13)) They had children:

- David Lindsay, 1st Earl of Crawford.
- Sir Alexander Lindsay of Baltrody. He fought in a tournament with Ralph de Nevill 1391, a warrant to this effect being granted by King Richard II 20 June 1391. He had a pension from Crail, the entries in the Exchequer Rolls proving that he died between 1397 and 1398. He probably died childless.
- Euphemia Lindsay, who married David Stewart, Earl of Strathearn

Lindsay married secondly to Marjorie, daughter to Sir John Stewart of Ralston, and niece to Robert II of Scotland. They had children:

- Sir William Lindsay of Rossie, known as one of those responsible for the death of David, Duke of Rothesay. He was tutor to David, younger son of the Earl of Crawford in 1407, executor to the Earl, had charter of lands in Ballenbreich from Earl Alexander in 1423. He married Matilda Stewart (died 1485). He died between 1435 and 1437.
- Sir Walter Lindsay of Kinneff who was killed at the battle of Verneuil (1424). Katherine his widow married Walter Dempster. Sir Walter had a son also Walter
- Euphemia Lindsay who was engaged to David Duke of Rothesay, but the marriage did not take place.

Lindsay also had an illegitimate son Jon who was living in 1378. He also had a son James, Rector of St. Brioc, Canon and Treasurer of Aberdeen. He had dispensation for illegitimacy on taking Holy Orders, but as Sir Alexander Lindsay and his second wife must have been cousins James may have been their son.
