= Henry Sinclair =

Henry Sinclair may refer to:

- Henry I Sinclair, Earl of Orkney (1345–1400), Scottish-Norwegian nobleman
- Henry II Sinclair, Earl of Orkney (c. 1375–1422), Scottish-Norwegian nobleman
- Henry Sinclair, 4th Lord Sinclair (died 1513), Scottish nobleman
- Henry Sinclair (bishop) (1508–1565), lord-president of the court of session and bishop of Ross
- Henry Sinclair, 6th Lord Sinclair (died 1601), Scottish nobleman
- Henry Sinclair, 7th Lord Sinclair (died 1602), Scottish nobleman
- Henry Daniel Sinclair (1818–1868), explorer and founder of Bowen, Queensland, Australia
- Henry Harbinson Sinclair (1848-1914), businessman of California
- Henry Sinclair, 2nd Baron Pentland (1907–1984), Scottish peer

== See also ==
- Harry Sinclair (disambiguation)
