= Euphemia Stewart, Countess of Strathearn =

Euphemia Stewart
- Countess of Strathearn
- Died: c. 1434
- Spouse: Patrick Graham; Robert Stewart of Fife (m. 1414) Walter Stewart (m. 1415)
- Issue: Malise Graham, 1st Earl of Menteith; Euphemia, Countess of Douglas, Lady Hamilton; Elizabeth Lyon, Lady of Glamis
- House: Stuart
- Father: David Stewart, Earl of Strathearn

Euphemia Stewart, Countess of Strathearn (died c. 1434) was a Scottish noblewoman, the daughter of David Stewart, Earl Palatine of Strathearn and Caithness. She succeeded to both her father's titles after his death between 1385 and 1389, probably March 1386.

== Inheritance and marriages ==
Euphemia was born on an unknown date in Scotland, the daughter of David Stewart, Earl Palatine of Strathearn and Caithness. Her mother was the sister of David Lindsay, 1st Earl of Crawford; her first name is not known. As an only child she was heir to her father's earldoms. In about March 1386 her father died and she became suo jure Countess of Strathearn and Caithness. Calling herself Countess Palatine of Strathearn, she resigned the title Earl of Caithness to her uncle Walter Stewart, Earl of Atholl, sometime before 1402.

She was married to Patrick Graham, son of Sir Patrick Graham of Dundaff. They had issue:

- Malise, afterwards Earl of Menteith.
- Euphemia, married, first, about 1425, to Archibald Douglas, 5th Earl of Douglas, who died in June 1439; secondly, to James Hamilton of Cadzow, afterwards first Lord Hamilton.
- Elizabeth (or Anna), married her first cousin once removed Sir John Lyon, 1st Master of Glamis (d. 1435).

Patrick Graham appears to have taken the designation of Earl of Strathearn, as appears from a charter cited by Lord Strathallan in his history of the Drummonds, and others in the Register of the Great Seal. He was killed on St Laurence Day (10 August) 1413, near Crieff, by Sir John Drummond of Concraig, Steward of Strathearn, in a skirmish between them arising out of the Earl-consort's dissatisfaction with Sir John's official duties.

The Countess survived him, and received papal dispensations to marry Robert Stewart of Fife, eldest son of Murdoch Stewart, Duke of Albany (on 4 May 1414), and subsequently Robert's brother Walter (5 September 1415). She is alleged in Scots Peerage to have married Sir Patrick Dunbar of Bele, but this is erroneous: this was proved in 2009 to have been a second marriage of Euphemia Stewart, daughter of John Stewart of Ralston and the mother of Countess Euphemia's husband Sir Patrick Graham. She was still alive in 1434, but this is the last time she is mentioned in documents.

== Notes ==
Peerage of Scotland
| Preceded by David Stewart | Countess of Strathearn c. 1386 – 1413 | Succeeded by Malise Graham |
| Preceded by David Stewart | Countess of Caithness c. 1386 – x 1402 | Succeeded by Walter Stewart |
