= Harold Sinclair =

Harold Sinclair may refer to:

- Harold Sinclair, see fluid coupling
- Harold A. Sinclair, actor
- Harold Sinclair, novelist and musician

== See also ==
- Harry Sinclair (disambiguation)
