= Alexander Lindsay, 2nd Earl of Crawford =

Scottish magnate

Alexander Lindsay, 2nd Earl of Crawford (c. 1387–1438/1439) was a Scottish magnate.

== Life ==
He was the son of David Lindsay, 1st Earl of Crawford and Elizabeth Stewart, daughter of King Robert II and Euphemia de Ross. He was knighted at the coronation of King James I on 21 May 1424, and subsequently was one of the hostages for King James given over to the English from 1424 until November 1427.

== Family ==
He married Marjory or Marjorie of Dunbar, daughter of Sir David of Dunbar, and had issue:

- David Lindsay, 3rd Earl of Crawford, who succeeded his father as Earl.
- Elizabeth, who married John Drummond and had issue.
- Janet, who married Thomas Erskine, 2nd Lord Erskine and had issue.
- Christiane (Crystyane), who first married William Douglas of Lochleven (evidently in lieu of her sister) by whom she had at least a son Alexander, and a daughter Elizabeth who married Richard Lovel of Ballumbie. She married secondly David Wemyss of that Ilk (d. 1430), by whom she was the mother of John Wemyss of that Ilk and two daughters, Helen and Euphemia. She married lastly Sir James Auchinleck of that Ilk (d. 1449), by whom she was the mother of Sir John Auchinleck of that Ilk (d. 1502) among others

Peerage of Scotland
Preceded by David Lindsay	Earl of Crawford; 1407–1438	Succeeded by David Lindsay
