= Harry Sinclair (disambiguation) =

Harry Sinclair is an actor.

Harry Sinclair may also refer to:

- Harry Ford Sinclair, American industrialist
- Harry Sinclair (Neighbours), fictional character on the Australian soap opera Neighbours

== See also ==
- Henry Sinclair (disambiguation)
- Harold Sinclair (disambiguation)
