= David Stewart, Earl of Strathearn =

David Stewart
- Earl of Strathearn and Caithness
- Coat of arms of David Stewart, Earl of Strathearn, combining the Royal tressure of Scotland, the 2 chevrons of Strathearn and the fess chequy of house Stewart
- Born: 1357
- Died: c. 1386 (aged 28–29)
- Issue: Euphemia Stewart, Countess of Strathearn
- House: Stuart
- Father: Robert II of Scotland
- Mother: Euphemia de Ross

David Stewart (1357 – c. 1386), Prince of Scotland, was a 14th-century Scottish magnate. He was the eldest son of the second marriage of King Robert II with Euphemia de Ross. King Robert, on 26 March 1371, the day of his coronation, created him Earl of Strathearn, and on the following day his son David performed homage to his father as of Earl of Strathearn.

On 19 June the same year he obtained a charter of the barony of Urquhart. He received the Castle of Braal in Caithness 21 March 1375, and he was also given the title Earl of Caithness between that date and 28 December 1377, when he was styled "Earl Palatine of Strathearn and Caithness".

He was involved in a major dispute with his older half-brother, Alexander Stewart, Earl of Buchan, who by 1385 had occupied his castle at Urquhart. It is uncertain, but it is highly likely that he died in March 1386, and no later than 1389. His wife appears to have been a daughter of Sir Alexander Lindsay of Glenesk, and sister of David Lindsay, 1st Earl of Crawford. They had a daughter, Euphemia, who succeeded to the earldom. His widow married secondly Sir William Graham of Montrose, by whom she was the mother of his eldest son and heir Alexander Graham, esq., of Kincardine, father of the first Lord Graham.

== Notes ==
Peerage of Scotland
Preceded by Robert Stewart	Earl of Strathearn; 1371–1386	Succeeded by Euphemia Stewart
Vacant	Earl of Caithness; 1375 x 1377–1386	Succeeded by Euphemia Stewart
