= Elizabeth Crawford =

American painter

- Born: 1959 (age 66–67); Detroit, Michigan
- Education: Washington University in St. Louis (B.F.A. 1982)

Elizabeth Crawford is an American painter who obtained her bachelor's degree of Fine Arts from the College of Art at Washington University in St. Louis in 1982.

== Exhibitions ==
Solo exhibitions include Visuality, (2011) Second Street Gallery, Charlottesville, Virginia, One Thing Leads to Another, (2007) Jack Shainman Gallery, New York, NY, A Kick in the Pants, (2004), Jack Shainman Gallery, New York, NY, Get the Ball Rolling (2001) Jack Shainman Gallery, New York, NY, 1999), Contemporary Realist Gallery, San Francisco, CA, (1995, 1993) White Columns, New York, NY (1993).

Group Her work was featured in the Parking on Pavement (2018–19), Jack Shainman Kinderbrook exhibition. (2006, 2004, 2001, 1997, 1996), McGuffey Art Center, Charlottesville, VA, (2006, 2005), Islip Art Museum, East Islip, NY (2004), James Cohan Gallery, New York, NY (2000), Contemporary Realist Gallery, San Francisco, CA, (1996, 1995, 1994), New York Soho Biennial ’95, New York, NY, White Columns, New York, NY (1993), Art in General, New York, NY (1991), Soho Center for Visual Artists, New York, NY (1990), Museum of the National Arts Foundation at the Jacob Javits Federal Building, New York, NY (1989).

== Collections ==
Sam Fox School of Design & Visual Arts at Washington University in St. Louis
