= Henry St. Clair (American politician) =

American politician

Henry St. Clair was an American politician. He represented Macon County, Alabama in 1872. He lived in Tuskegee. He testified about the political climate, canvassing, and acts of intimidation against African Americans who overwhelmingly supported the Republican Party.

He received the most votes November 8, 1870.

== See also ==
- African American officeholders from the end of the Civil War until before 1900
