= Euphemia de Ross =

Queen of Scots from 1371 to 1389

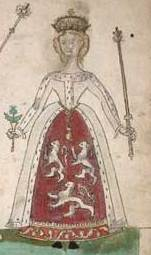
- Queen Euphemia pictured in the Forman Armorial, 1562

Queen consort of Scotland
- Tenure: 22 February 1371 – c. 1389
- Coronation: 1372 or 1373
- Born: c. 1329
- Died: c. 1389 (aged c. 60)
- Burial: Dunfermline Abbey
- Spouse: John Randolph, 3rd Earl of Moray (died 1346) Robert II of Scotland (m. 1355)
- Issue: David Stewart, 1st Earl of Caithness; Walter Stewart, 1st Earl of Atholl; Elizabeth Stewart, Countess of Crawford; Egidia Stewart
- House: Ross
- Father: Hugh, Earl of Ross
- Mother: Margaret de Graham

Euphemia de Ross (c. 1329 - c. 1389) was Queen of Scots, as the wife of King Robert II, from 1371 until her death.

== Life ==
Euphemia was the daughter of Hugh, Earl of Ross, and Margaret Graham, and may have been born before the legitimation of her parents' marriage in November 1329. Euphemia's maternal ancestry has been the subject of debate. Her father was killed at the Battle of Halidon Hill in 1333.

Euphemia married John Randolph, 3rd Earl of Moray, who was released from captivity in England before 19 January 1342, as her first husband. Randolph was killed at the Battle of Neville's Cross on 17 October 1346, leaving Euphemia to retain substantial property rights as his widow. Euphemia married Robert Stewart, the nephew and heir presumptive of David II of Scotland, before 6 May 1355. This marriage may have served to reconcile Stewart with Euphemia's brother, William, Earl of Ross, after they had disputed possession of the earldom of Strathearn. Stewart received the earldom from David II in 1357, while his subsequent grants in Strathearn seem to have required Euphemia's consent. Stewart's marriage to Euphemia gave him control over her substantial landholdings as dowager countess of Moray, including the lordship of Badenoch. Possession of Badenoch had passed to Euphemia's stepson, Alexander, by 1370.

=== Queen of Scots ===
Euphemia's husband succeeded David II as King of Scots on 22 February 1371, and was crowned as Robert II at Scone the following month. Euphemia's own coronation as queen was delayed for almost two years, until she was crowned at Scone by Alexander de Kininmund, Bishop of Aberdeen, sometime between 6 December 1372 and 24 March 1373. Various explanations have been offered for this delay. The ongoing legal action by Euphemia's predecessor as queen, Margaret Drummond, at the papal court in Avignon may have dissuaded the Scottish clergy from conducting her coronation. Euphemia's refusal to accept the precedence of Robert II's sons by his first wife, Elizabeth Mure, over her own sons in the line of succession may also have caused the delay. A tailzie passed by the Scottish parliament on 4 April 1373, shortly after Euphemia's coronation, confirmed her sons' inferior status.

Euphemia left little trace in contemporary records. Her seal as queen, dating from 1375, depicts her standing between the arms of Scotland and the earldom of Ross. Euphemia's husband acknowledged a mistress, Mariota de Cardeny, as early as 1372 in a relationship that produced several illegitimate children. Robert II's relationship with Cardeny may have diminished Euphemia's presence at court, although she remained powerful enough to promote the careers of her sons. David, Euphemia's eldest son by the king, had received the earldoms of Strathearn and Caithness by 1377 in grants that likely reflected her influence. Her younger son, Walter, acquired the lordship of Brechin through marriage in 1378. Euphemia sought a canonry at Dunkeld Cathedral for her chaplain in a successful petition to Clement VII in 1385.

The exact date of Euphemia's death is unknown. A manuscript collected by James Balfour, the seventeenth-century historian, states that she died in 1387. An addition to the Scotichronicon, the fifteenth-century chronicle of Walter Bower, makes the opposing assertion that Euphemia died on 20 February 1388. Euphemia was apparently alive on 19 June of the same year, but had died by the following 23 February; the correct date of her death may thus be 20 February 1389. She was buried at Dunfermline Abbey.

== Issue ==
Euphemia's first marriage did not produce any known issue. She had four children by Robert II.

- David, Earl of Strathearn (c. 1357 - c. 1386), married a daughter of Alexander Lindsay of Glenesk; their only child was named Euphemia.
- Walter, Earl of Atholl (c. 1360 - 26 March 1437), married Margaret Barclay, lady of Brechin, and had issue.
- Elizabeth, married David Lindsay, 1st Earl of Crawford, and had issue.
- Egidia, married William Douglas of Nithsdale and had issue.

== Sources ==
- Boardman, S. I. (2004a). "Euphemia [nee Euphemia Ross] (b. in or before 1329? d. 1388/9), queen of Scots, consort of Robert II". Oxford Dictionary of National Biography (online ed.). Oxford University Press. doi:10.1093/ref:odnb/54314. (Subscription, Wikipedia Library access or UK public library membership required.) (subscription required)
- Boardman, S. I. (2004b). "Randolph, John, third earl of Moray (d. 1346)". Oxford Dictionary of National Biography (online ed.). Oxford University Press. doi:10.1093/ref:odnb/23119. (Subscription, Wikipedia Library access or UK public library membership required.) (subscription required)
- Boardman, S. I. (2004c). "Stewart, David, first earl of Strathearn and first earl of Caithness (b. in or after 1357? d. 1386?)". Oxford Dictionary of National Biography (online ed.). Oxford University Press. doi:10.1093/ref:odnb/54325. (Subscription, Wikipedia Library access or UK public library membership required.) (subscription required)
- Boardman, Stephen (1996). The Early Stewart Kings: Robert II and Robert III, 1371-1406. Edinburgh: Tuckwell Press. ISBN 978 1 904607 68 7.
- Penman, Michael (2004). David II. East Linton: Tuckwell Press. ISBN 1 86232 2023.
- Weir, Alison (1996). Britain's Royal Families: The Complete Genealogy. London: Pimlico.

Scottish royalty
Preceded by Margaret Drummond	Queen consort of Scotland; 1371–1389	Succeeded by Annabella Drummond
