= Henry II Sinclair, Earl of Orkney =

Medieval Scottish nobleman

Henry Sinclair
- Earl of Orkney; Lord Sinclair; Baron of Roslin
- Earl of Orkney, Lord Sinclair and Baron of Roslin coats of arms
- Predecessor: Henry I Sinclair, Earl of Orkney
- Successor: William Sinclair, 3rd Earl of Orkney, 1st Earl of Caithness, 11th Baron of Roslin and 2nd Lord Sinclair
- Born: c. 1375
- Died: c. 1420
- Noble family: Clan Sinclair

Henry II Sinclair, Earl of Orkney (c. 1375 – c. 1420) was the Jarl (Earl) of Orkney, 10th Baron of Roslin and Pantler of Scotland. According to Roland Saint-Clair writing in the late 19th century, Henry Sinclair was also the first of his family to hold the title of Lord Sinclair.

== Early life ==
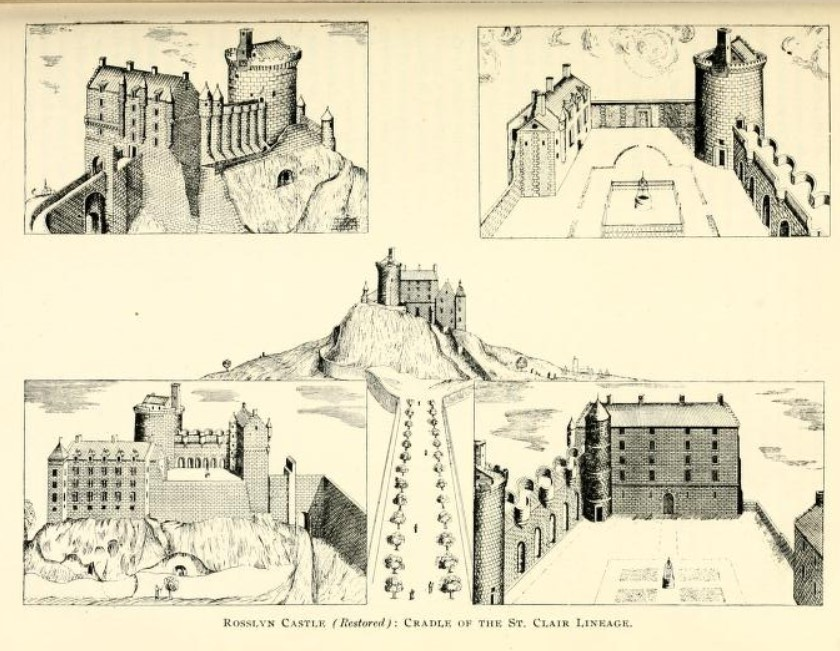
Rosslyn or Roslin Castle, seat of the Sinclairs who were Barons of Roslin, reconstruction image

He was son of Henry I Sinclair, Earl of Orkney, by his wife Jean, daughter of John Halyburton of Dirleton. He married Egida Douglas, daughter of Sir William Douglas of Nithsdale and Egidia Stewart, and the maternal granddaughter of King Robert II of Scotland. Sir William Douglas was murdered by a group of assassins who had been employed by Lord Clifford and as a result Sinclair inherited through his wife the whole of the Lordship of Nithsdale.

== Earl of Orkney ==
Sinclair was one of those captured following the Battle of Homildon Hill in 1402, but released on ransom. He had succeeded his father, de facto, as Jarl by 1404; there is no record that he was ever officially installed as Jarl, and no certain record that he ever visited his jarldom.

He was one of those who accompanied the young King James, then the uncrowned James I of Scotland on his journey to France aboard the Maryenknyght. That ship was captured by English pirates off Flamborough Head in 1406. He followed the prince into captivity, but was soon released. Subsequently, he was often in England on business connected with the king's imprisonment.

Henry Sinclair died of influenza on 1 February 1420.

== Marriage and issue ==
In about 1407 he married Egidia Douglas, daughter of Sir William Douglas of Nithsdale and wife Egidia and maternal granddaughter of King Robert II of Scotland and Euphemia de Ross.

1. William Sinclair, last Jarl of Orkney, and first Earl of Caithness
2. Beatrix Sinclair, who married James Douglas, 7th Earl of Douglas.

== See also ==
- Barony of Roslin
- Lord Sinclair
- Earl of Caithness
- Lord Herdmanston

Peerage of Scotland
Preceded by Henry Sinclair	Jarl of Orkney; 1404–1422	Succeeded by William Sinclair
New creation	Lord Sinclair; 1400–1420	Succeeded by William Sinclair
Baronage of Scotland
Preceded by Henry Sinclair	Baron of Roslin; 1400–1420	Succeeded by William Sinclair
