= Joan of the Tower =

Queen of Scotland from 1329 to 1362

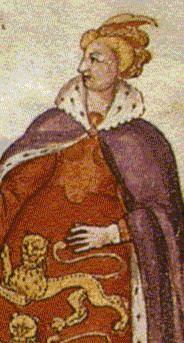
- Queen Joan depicted in the 1591 Seton Armorial

Queen consort of Scotland
- Tenure: 7 June 1329 – 7 September 1362
- Coronation: 24 November 1331
- Born: 5 July 1321; Tower of London, London, England
- Died: 7 September 1362 (aged 41); Hertford Castle, Hertfordshire, England
- Burial: Christ Church Greyfriars, London
- Spouse: David II of Scotland (m. 1328)
- House: Plantagenet
- Father: Edward II of England
- Mother: Isabella of France

Joan of the Tower (5 July 1321 – 7 September 1362), daughter of Edward II of England and Isabella of France, was Queen of Scotland from 1329 to her death as the first wife of King David II.

== Life ==
The youngest daughter of King Edward II of England and Isabella of France, Joan was born in the Tower of London on 5 July 1321. She and her sister, Eleanor of Woodstock, were placed under the guardianship of Ralph de Monthermer and Lady Isabella de Valence.

In accordance with the Treaty of Edinburgh–Northampton, Joan was married on 17 July 1328 to David, the son and heir of Robert the Bruce, at Berwick-upon-Tweed. She was seven years old and he was four at the time of their marriage. Their marriage lasted 34 years, but it was childless and apparently loveless.

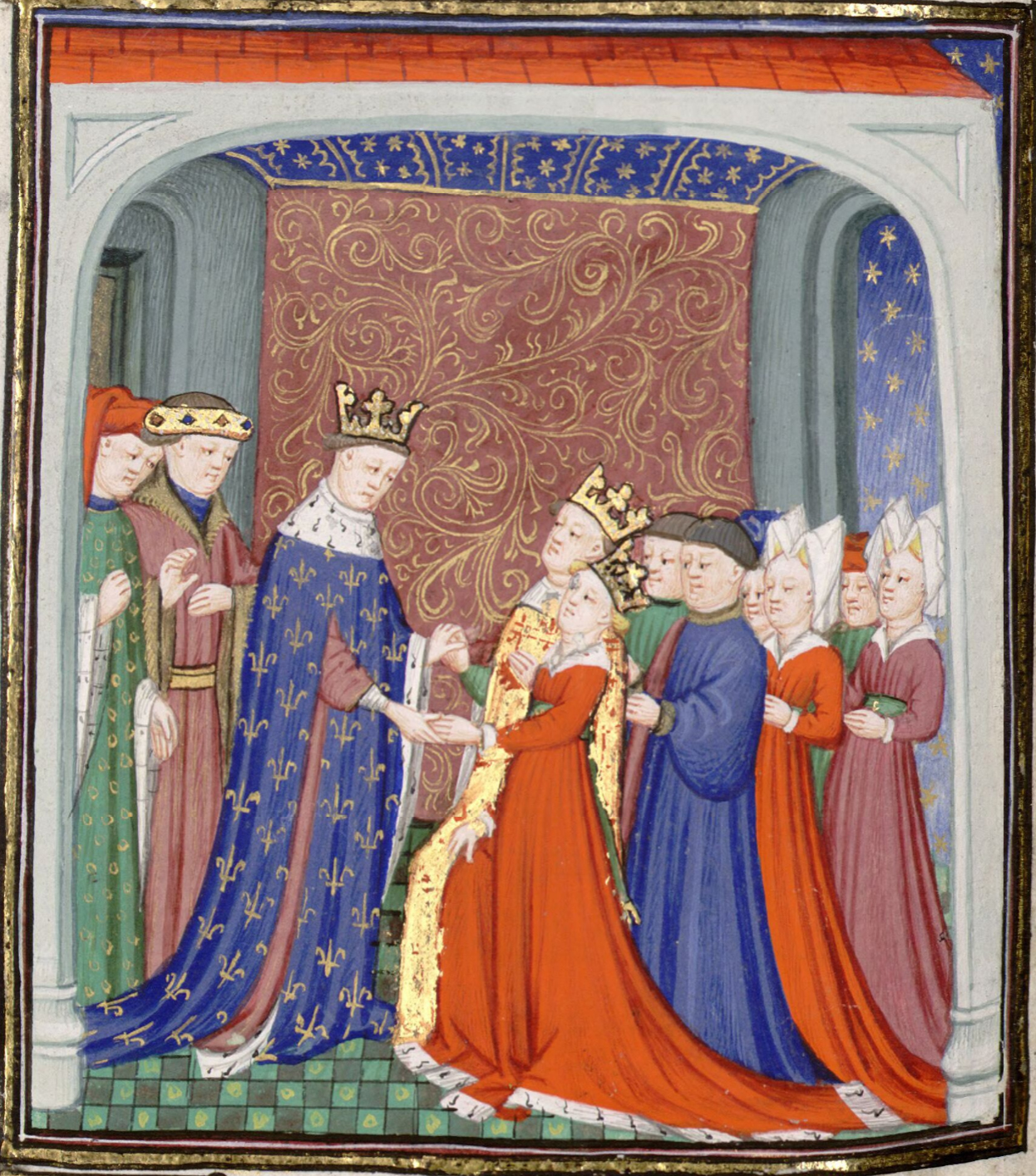
Joan and David II with Philip VI in a miniature from Froissart's Chronicles

On 7 June 1329, Robert I of Scotland died and David became king. He was crowned at Scone Abbey in November 1331.

In the spring of 1333, Joan's brother, Edward III of England, invaded Scotland. After his victory at the Battle of Halidon Hill near Berwick-upon-Tweed in July 1333, David and Joan were sent for safety to France. They reached Boulogne-sur-Mer in May 1334, where they were received by Philip VI, her mother's cousin. Little is known about the life of the Scottish king and queen in France, except that they took up residence at Château Gaillard and Philip treated them with regard.

Meanwhile, David's representatives had obtained the upper hand in Scotland, and David and Joan were thus able to return in June 1341, when he took the reins of government into his own hands. David II was taken prisoner at the Battle of Neville's Cross in County Durham on 17 October 1346, and remained imprisoned in England for eleven years. Although Edward III allowed Joan to visit her husband in the Tower of London a few times, she did not become pregnant. After his release in 1357, she decided to remain in England. Joan was close to her mother, whom she nursed during her last days.

After years of being estranged from her husband, David II, Joan died in 1362, aged 41, at Hertford Castle, Hertfordshire.

== Ancestry ==
Ancestors of Joan of the Tower

8. Henry III of England
4. Edward I of England
9. Eleanor of Provence
2. Edward II of England
10. Ferdinand III of Castile
5. Eleanor of Castile
11. Joan, Countess of Ponthieu
1. Joan of The Tower
12. Philip III of France
6. Philip IV of France
13. Isabella of Aragon
3. Isabella of France
14. Henry I of Navarre
7. Joan I of Navarre
15. Blanche of Artois

== Sources ==
- Ashley, Mike (1999). The Mammoth Book of British Kings and Queens. London: Robinson Publishers. ISBN 978-0786706921.
- Brown, Michael (2004). The Wars of Scotland, 1214–1371. Edinburgh: Edinburgh University Press. ISBN 978-0748612383.
- Castor, Helen (2011). She-Wolves: The Women Who Ruled England Before Elizabeth. London: Faber & Faber. ISBN 978-0571237067.
- Maclagan, Michael; Louda, Jiří (1999), Line of Succession: Heraldry of the Royal Families of Europe, London: Little, Brown & Co, p. 17, ISBN 1-85605-469-1
- Marshall, Rosalind (2003). Scottish Queens 1034–1714. East Linton: Tuckwell Press. ISBN 9781862322714.
- Mortimer, Ian (2008). The Perfect King The Life of Edward III, Father of the English Nation. London: Vintage. ISBN 978-0099527091.
- Panton, James (2011). Historical Dictionary of the British Monarchy. Lanham, MD: Scarecrow Press. ISBN 978-0810857797
- Prestwich, Michael (1980). The Three Edwards: War and State in England, 1272-1377. Routledge.
- Stevenson, Katie (2014). Power and Propaganda: Scotland 1306-1488. Edinburgh University Press.
- Warner, Kathryn (2016). Isabella of France: The Rebel Queen. Amberley Publishing.
- Warner, Kathryn (2020). Philippa of Hainault: Mother of the English Nation. Amberley Publishing. ISBN 978-1-4456-6280-0.

Scottish royalty
Vacant Title last held by Elizabeth de Burgh	Queen consort of Scotland; 1329–1362	Vacant Title next held by Margaret Drummond
