= Egidia Stewart =

Princess of Scotland

- Born: c. 1360; Scotland
- Spouse: William Douglas of Nithsdale
- House: Stewart
- Father: Robert II of Scotland
- Mother: Euphemia de Ross

Egidia Stewart (c. 1360-d. unknown), Princess of Scotland, was the daughter of King Robert II of Scotland by his second wife Euphemia de Ross.

== Life ==
Egidia was the daughter of King Robert II of Scotland by his second wife Euphemia de Ross.

According to the Liber Pluscarden, Egidia Stewart's beauty was well renowned. King Charles VI of France had "sent a certain most subtle painter to do her portrait and portray her charms, intending to take her to wife." But the King of France and all other of Egidia's admirers lost out to the chivalric charms of William Douglas of Nithsdale (c. 1360–1391). William was an illegitimate son of Archibald the Grim, 3rd Earl of Douglas and an unknown mother, and was reportedly dashing with a statuesque physical appearance. He had distinguished himself by performing feats of valour at the siege of Carlisle Castle in 1385 and was a "flower of chivalry". He was later a crusader and died in Danzing, now Gdansk, Poland.

Part of Egidia's marriage portion were the lands of Nithsdale in south-western Scotland, Herbertshire in the county of Stirling and an annuity of £300. They married before 26 December 1387.

The date of her death is unknown.

== Issue ==
Egidia and her husband had two children:

- William Douglas of Nithsdale (d. c. 1419), knight.
- Egidia Douglas (c. 1390-c. 1438), known as the "Fair Maid of Nithsdale". She married firstly Henry Sinclair, 2nd Earl Orkney and secondly, after obtaining a papal dispensation, Alasdair Stewart (executed 1425).
