= David Lindsay, 1st Earl of Crawford =

Scottish admiral (c. 1360 – 1407)

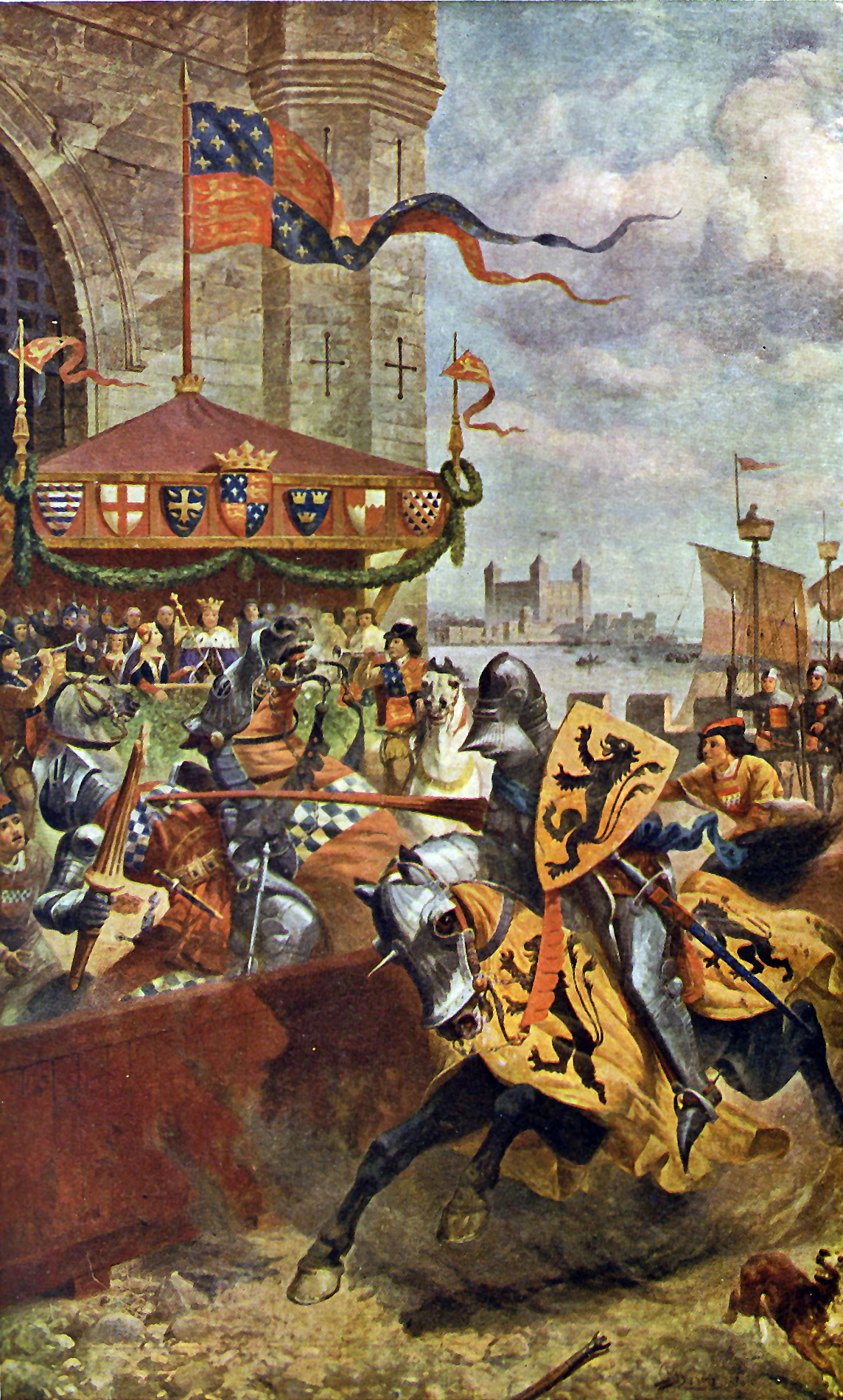
Welles striking Lindsay in their famous joust (1886 painting)

David Lindsay, 1st Earl of Crawford (c. 1360 – 1407) was a Scottish peer who was created Earl of Crawford in 1398.

== Life ==
Crawford was the son of Sir Alexander Lindsay of Glenesk and Katherine Stirling. Succeeding his father in 1381, he was known until his elevation to the peerage as Sir David Lindsay of Glenesk. He was also the 10th baron of Crawford, Lanarkshire. In 1398, his father-in-law Robert II gave him the title of earl, along with Crawford Castle.

Many historians believe that Lindsay was also the organiser for the Battle of the Clans at Perth in 1396.

Lindsay is arguably most famous for his duel between himself and John Welles, 5th Baron Welles. A notable jousting encounter that took place in 1390 on London Bridge, witnessed by a large crowd including nobles and commoners. It was arranged following a dispute over the martial prowess of English and Scottish knights, with Welles publicly boasting of the superiority of English chivalry and Lindsay accepting the challenge to defend Scottish honor.

The combat was conducted à l’outrance, meaning the knights fought until one was unhorsed or incapacitated. On the first two passes with lances, neither knight was unseated, and Lindsay’s skill was such that spectators joked he was tied to his horse. To demonstrate his independence, he dismounted and remounted his horse before the third pass.

On the third charge, Lindsay struck Welles with sufficient force to unhorse and seriously injure him. Following the combat, Lindsay helped Welles from the field, an action widely praised as an example of chivalric conduct.

The duel enhanced Lindsay’s reputation in England, and he was received at King Richard II’s court before returning to Scotland, where he later became the first Earl of Crawford.

Lord Crawford died at Finavon Castle in 1407 and was buried at the church of the Greyfriars at Dundee.

== Marriage and issue ==
He married Elizabeth Stewart, daughter of King Robert II and Euphemia de Ross. They had four children:

- Alexander Lindsay, 2nd Earl of Crawford (c. 1387–1438)
- Gerard Lindsay (died 1421)
- David Lindsay, Lord of Newdosk (born 1407)
- Elizabeth Lindsay (born 1381), married Robert Erskine, 1st Lord Erskine and had issue.

Earl David and Elizabeth Stewart are also assigned a number of children in error in many records, including

- allegedly Marjorie Lindsay, assigned as the wife of Sir William Douglas of Lochleven. This is an error for Marjory Stewart who married firstly Sir Alexander Lindsay of Glenesk as his 2nd wife (and David's stepmother in fact), and secondly Sir Henry Douglas of Lochleven, by whom she was the mother of Sir William Douglas
- allegedly Isabella Lindsay (born 1407), who married Sir John Maxwell. This was in fact the daughter of Sir James Lindsay of Crawford (uncle of Earl David) by his wife Egidia, or Giles, Stewart
- Ingelram Lindsay, Bishop of Aberdeen (died 1458). Ingram Lindsay was dispensed on account of his having been illegitimate; he was acknowledged by Alexander Lindsay, 2nd Earl of Crawford as a kinsman and he may have been Earl David's son, but clearly not by Elizabeth Stewart.

== Sources ==
- Balfour Paul, Sir James-The Scots Peerage-IX Vols. Edinburgh 1904
- Grant, Neil. Scottish Clans and Tartans. New York, Octopus Publishing Group Limited: 2000. ISBN 1-58574-094-2
- J. Ravilious, Dame Crystyane of Douglas and her ancestry, The Scottish Genealogist (Sept 2012), Vol. LIX, No. 3, pp. 129–138.

Peerage of Scotland
New creation	Earl of Crawford; 1398–1407	Succeeded by Alexander Lindsay
Military offices
Preceded by Robert Logan of Grugar	Lord High Admiral of Scotland	Succeeded by ?
