= Margaret Drummond, Queen of Scotland =

Queen of Scots from 1364 to 1369

Margaret Drummond

Queen consort of Scots
- Tenure: 20/02/1364–20/03/1369
- Born: c. 1340
- Died: after 31 January 1375
- Spouse: Sir John Logie of that Ilk David II of Scotland (m. 1364; div. 1369)
- Issue: John Logie
- House: Clan Drummond
- Father: Sir Malcolm Drummond

Margaret Drummond (c. 1340–aft. 31 January 1375), known also by her first married name as Margaret Logie, was the second queen of David II of Scotland.

== Life ==
She was the daughter of Sir Malcolm Drummond (aft. 1295-Battle of Neville's Cross, Durham, 17 October 1346), Thane of Lennox, Chief of Clan Drummond, and paternal granddaughter of Sir Malcolm Drummond (aft. 1270-1325), Thane of Lennox, who fought in the Battle of Dunbar in 1296, where he was captured by the English, and in 1301 was again captured by the English, and in the Battle of Bannockburn in 1314, and wife ... de Graham, daughter of Sir Patrick de Graham of Kincardine and wife Annabella of Strathearn.

Margaret first married Sir John Logie of that Ilk (d. 1363), having by him a son, John Logie (c. 1365–c. 1395.)

To counter Stewart influence, David II of Scotland pardoned John Logie in September 1343, son of a conspirator against Robert the Bruce in 1320, and restored to him the large lordship of Strathgartney bordering the earldoms of Menteith and Lennox. Strathgartney had been held by Sir John Menteith of Arran and Knapdale's family (cadets of the Stewarts and also former keepers of Dumbarton and guardians of Menteith). At the Battle of Neville's Cross in 1346, the king was apparently deserted by some of his subjects and led off to eleven years' captivity in England. After Neville's Cross the Steward as lieutenant would allow John Menteith to recover Strathgartney: This led David, when he returned from England in 1357/58, to try again to restore Logie's sasine.

By 1361/62 Margaret was a mistress to King David who was widowed from his first wife, Joan of The Tower, the sister of the English King Edward III, on 14 August 1362. Margaret is first recorded on 20 January 1363 making a grant in a charter to the Friars Preachers of Aberdeen.

In addition to David's aid to Margaret's husband John Logie, Margaret's brother, Malcolm Drummond, became coroner of Perth and received new lands in the shire, as did their uncle, John Drummond, whom David would make Earl of Menteith in 1360 directly denying a son of the Steward. David's favour to the Drummonds must have fuelled the tension between them and the Stewarts and Campbells: this erupted into a full-blown murderous feud by the 1350s.

Margaret married David II of Scotland at Inchmurdach in Fife, on 20 February 1364. Walter Bower claimed in Scotichronicon that: "with the aim therefore of providing for the succession to the kingdom from the fruit of her womb (if God granted it), King David chose a most beautiful lady, Margaret Logie, not so much for the excellence of her character … as for the pleasure he took in her desirable appearance" She was the first Scotswoman since the 11th century to marry a reigning King of Scots.

Whilst Margaret was high in her husband's favour, her niece Annabella married John Stewart, who later became king as Robert III, and who was Margaret's grand-nephew by marriage. Her nephew Sir Malcolm Drummond married Isabella Douglas, daughter of William Douglas, 1st Earl of Douglas and received grants of lands in Perthshire.

They had no children and the King divorced her on 20 March 1369 on grounds of infertility, but with a £100 pension granted. Margaret, however, challenged the divorce. She received a safe conduct to pass through England in 1372, then travelled to Avignon, in southern France. In Avignon she had an audience with and made a successful appeal to the Pope Urban V to reverse the sentence of divorce which had been pronounced against her in Scotland. As she had a child from her first marriage, it seems more likely that David himself was infertile, since his thirty-four-year marriage to his first wife also bore no issue. David also began an affair with Agnes Dunbar, sister of George, Earl of March which produced no children.

Margaret survived the King, and was alive on 31 January 1375, but seems to have died soon after that date. She died whilst on pilgrimage to Rome and her funeral was paid for by Pope Gregory XI.

Scottish royalty
Preceded by Joan of The Tower	Queen consort of Scotland; 1364–1369	Succeeded by Euphemia de Ross
