= William Douglas of Nithsdale =

Scottish knight and Northern Crusader

Sir William Douglas of Nithsdale (c. 1370(?) – 1391) was a Scottish knight and Northern Crusader.

Coat of Arms of William Douglas of Nithsdale

== Early life ==
William Douglas was an illegitimate son of Archibald the Grim, 3rd Earl of Douglas and an unknown mother.

A man of apparently dashing bearing, Douglas was with the Franco-Scots army when it unsuccessfully besieged Carlisle Castle in 1385, the defending Governor being Lord Clifford. He is recorded as performing feats of valour and killing many Englishmen. According to Andrew of Wyntoun:

A yhowng joly bachelere
Prysyd gretly wes off were,
For he wes evyr traveland
Qwhille be se and qwhille be land
To skathe his fays rycht besy
Swa that thai dred him grettumly

— Orygynale Cronykil of Scotland ix, c.21

== Marriage ==
Douglas certainly had gained his spurs by 1387 when he married Egidia Stewart, Princess of Scotland, a daughter of King Robert II and Euphemia Ross. According to the Liber Pluscarden, Egidia Stewart's beauty was well renowned. Charles VI of France had "sent a certain most subtle painter to do her portrait and portray her charms, intending to take her to wife." But the King of France and all other of Egidia's admirers had lost out to the chivalric charms of Douglas. Part of her marriage portion were the lands of Nithsdale in south-western Scotland, Herbertshire in the county of Stirling and an annuity of £300.

== Ireland ==
Within his first year of marriage the young Nithsdale led a punitive raid against Irish raiders who had been troubling the tenantry of his father's Fiefdom of Galloway. In early summer 1388, with a party of 500 well prepared veteran men-at-arms he sailed into Carlingford Lough, landed outside the town and summoned their leaders. The chief of the townsfolk offered a sum for a temporary truce, to which Nithsdale agreed. Secretly the townsfolk sent off to Dundalk for reinforcements, with which they were obliged. 800 spearmen from Dundalk surprised the Scots camp by night, and were supported by a sortie from Carlingford town. The Scots, veterans of years of brutal Border warfare, drove the Irishmen off, captured the town and burnt it, seized the Castle and captured 15 ships in the harbour. En route back to Scotland Nithsdale "ravaged" the Isle of Man. Nithsdale's expeditionary force sailed back into Loch Ryan with enough time to join his father and the Earl of Fife and Menteith who had just led an expedition over the western marches into Northern England while a second army under James, 2nd Earl of Douglas, simultaneously led an expedition into England by the eastern marches, which culminated in the Battle of Otterburn.

== Feuding, Crusading and Death ==
The year after Otterburn a truce was called between Scotland and England. Nithsdale on a knightly quest for glory decided, about 1389, to join the Teutonic Knights, who were fighting the Lithuanians in Baltic region. Nithsdale had previously quarrelled with Lord Clifford, a former adversary at Carlisle and whose forebear had claimed Douglasdale under Edward I of England's oppression. While both were abroad, it is alleged that Clifford challenged Nithsdale to single combat, and that Douglas even went to France to obtain special armour for the fight. Clifford, however, died on 18 August 1391, but Nithsdale is said to have kept their "tryst", and whilst walking upon the bridge leading to the main gate at Danzig was "killed by the English". The burghers of Danzig decided that "upon account of a signal service which the Douglas family did to this city in relieving it in its utmost extremities against the Poles, the Scots were allowed to be free burghers of the town". Subsequently, the stone fascia of the Hohe Thor (High Gate) was adorned with the coat of arms of this nobleman and for centuries it was commonly referred to as the Douglas Port or Douglas Gate, described as such as late as 1734.

== Issue ==
By Princess Egidia, Nithsdale had two children:

- Egidia Douglas, known as the "Fair Maid of Nithsdale" married:

- 1. Henry Sinclair, 2nd Earl of Orkney (d. 1422)
- 2. Sir Alasdair Stewart (executed 1425) son of Murdoch Stewart, 2nd Duke of Albany

- Sir William Douglas, Knt., Lord of Nithsdale (d.c.1419), knighted when very young as he is described as chevalier in a safe-conduct dated 30 January 1406, when he could not have been more than nineteen.
