= David II of Scotland =

King of Scotland from 1329 to 1371

David II
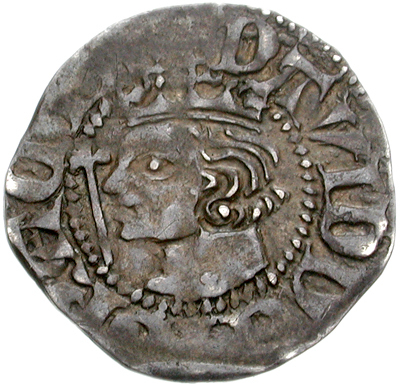
- A coin depicting David II

King of Scots
- Reign: 7 June 1329 – 22 February 1371
- Coronation: 24 November 1331
- Predecessor: Robert I
- Successor: Robert II
- Regents: See list: Thomas Randolph, 1st Earl of Moray (1329–1332); Donald, Earl of Mar (1332); Sir Andrew Murray (1332); Sir Archibald Douglas (1332–1333); Robert Stewart, 7th High Steward (1334–1335); John Randolph, 3rd Earl of Moray (1334–1335); Sir Andrew Murray (1335–1338); Robert Stewart, 7th High Steward (1338–1341, 1346–1357)
- Contender: Edward Balliol (1332–1356)
- Born: 5 March 1324; Dunfermline Abbey, Fife, Scotland
- Died: 22 February 1371 (aged 46); Edinburgh Castle, Edinburgh, Scotland
- Burial: Holyrood Abbey
- Spouses: Joan of England (m. 1328; died 1362) Margaret Drummond (m. 1364; div. 1370)
- House: Bruce
- Father: Robert I of Scotland
- Mother: Elizabeth de Burgh

David II (5 March 1324 – 22 February 1371) was King of Scotland from 1329 until his death in 1371. Upon the death of his father, Robert the Bruce, David succeeded to the throne at the age of five and was crowned at Scone in November 1331, becoming the first Scottish monarch to be anointed at his coronation. During his childhood, David was governed by a series of guardians, and Edward III of England sought to take advantage of David's minority by supporting an invasion of Scotland by Edward Balliol, beginning the Second War of Scottish Independence. Following the English victory at the Battle of Halidon Hill in 1333, King David, Queen Joan and the rump of his government were evacuated to France, where he remained in exile until it was safe for him to return to Scotland in 1341.

In 1346, David invaded England in support of France during the Hundred Years' War. His army was defeated at the Battle of Neville's Cross and he was captured and held as a prisoner in England for eleven years, while his nephew Robert Stewart governed Scotland. In 1357 the Treaty of Berwick brought the Second War of Independence to an end, the Scots agreed to pay a ransom of 100,000 merks, and David was allowed to return home. Heavy taxation was needed to pay for the ransom, which was to be paid in instalments, and David alienated his subjects by using the money for his own purposes. By 1363 it was found impossible to raise the remaining ransom, and David sought its cancellation by offering to bequeath the succession to the Scottish throne to Edward III or one of his sons. In 1364, the parliament of Scotland rejected David's proposal to make Lionel of Antwerp, Duke of Clarence, the next king. Despising his nephew, David sought to prevent him from succeeding to his throne by marrying his mistress Margaret Drummond and producing an alternative heir. When his second wife failed to do so, David unsuccessfully attempted to divorce her.

Although David spent long periods in exile or captivity, he managed to ensure the survival of his kingdom, reformed the machinery of government, and left the Scottish monarchy in a strong position. The last male of the House of Bruce, he died childless in 1371 after a reign of 41 years and was succeeded by his nephew Robert II.

== Early life ==
David II was born on 5 March 1324 at Dunfermline Abbey in Fife, one of twin sons born to King Robert the Bruce, and Elizabeth de Burgh. Soon after his birth he was wet nursed at the Bishop of St Andrews' manor at Inchmurdoch in Fife. David was created Earl of Carrick by his father in 1326, and an official household was established for the prince at Turnberry Castle. Very little is known of his youth, though it is recorded that King Robert paid for Dominican friars to educate David, and also purchased books for him. David's mother died in 1327, when he was three years old. In accordance with the Treaty of Edinburgh–Northampton's terms, on 17 July 1328, when he was four years old, David was married to seven-year-old Joan, the daughter of Edward II of England and Isabella of France, at Berwick Castle. The young earl of Carrick received a visit from his ailing father at Turnberry in February 1329.

== Reign ==
David became king upon the death of his father on 7 June 1329. David II's youth and the uncertainty of the Anglo-Scottish peace meant he was not moved from Turnberry to Scone for his coronation for two-and-a-half years. The seven-year-old king and his wife were crowned at Scone Abbey on 24 November 1331, with David becoming the first Scottish monarch to be anointed at their coronation. Upon David's accession, Thomas Randolph, 1st Earl of Moray was appointed as Guardian under Robert I's orders, to govern Scotland until David reached adulthood, and the royal government of King Robert remained largely in place from 1329 to 1332. After Moray's death, on 20 July 1332, he was replaced by Donald, Earl of Mar, elected by an assembly of the magnates of Scotland at Perth, 2 August 1332. Ten days later, Mar fell at the Battle of Dupplin Moor. Sir Andrew Murray of Bothwell, who was married to Christian (or Christina), the sister of King Robert I, was chosen as the new Guardian. The English took him prisoner at Roxburgh in April 1333 and was accordingly replaced as Guardian by Archibald Douglas (the Tyneman), who fell at the Battle of Halidon Hill that July.

Meanwhile, on 24 September 1332, following the Scots' defeat at Dupplin, Edward Balliol, a protégé of Edward III of England, and a pretender to the throne of Scotland, was crowned by the English and his Scots adherents. By December, however, Balliol was forced to flee to England after the Battle of Annan, although he returned the following year as part of an invasion force led by the English king.

=== Exile in France ===
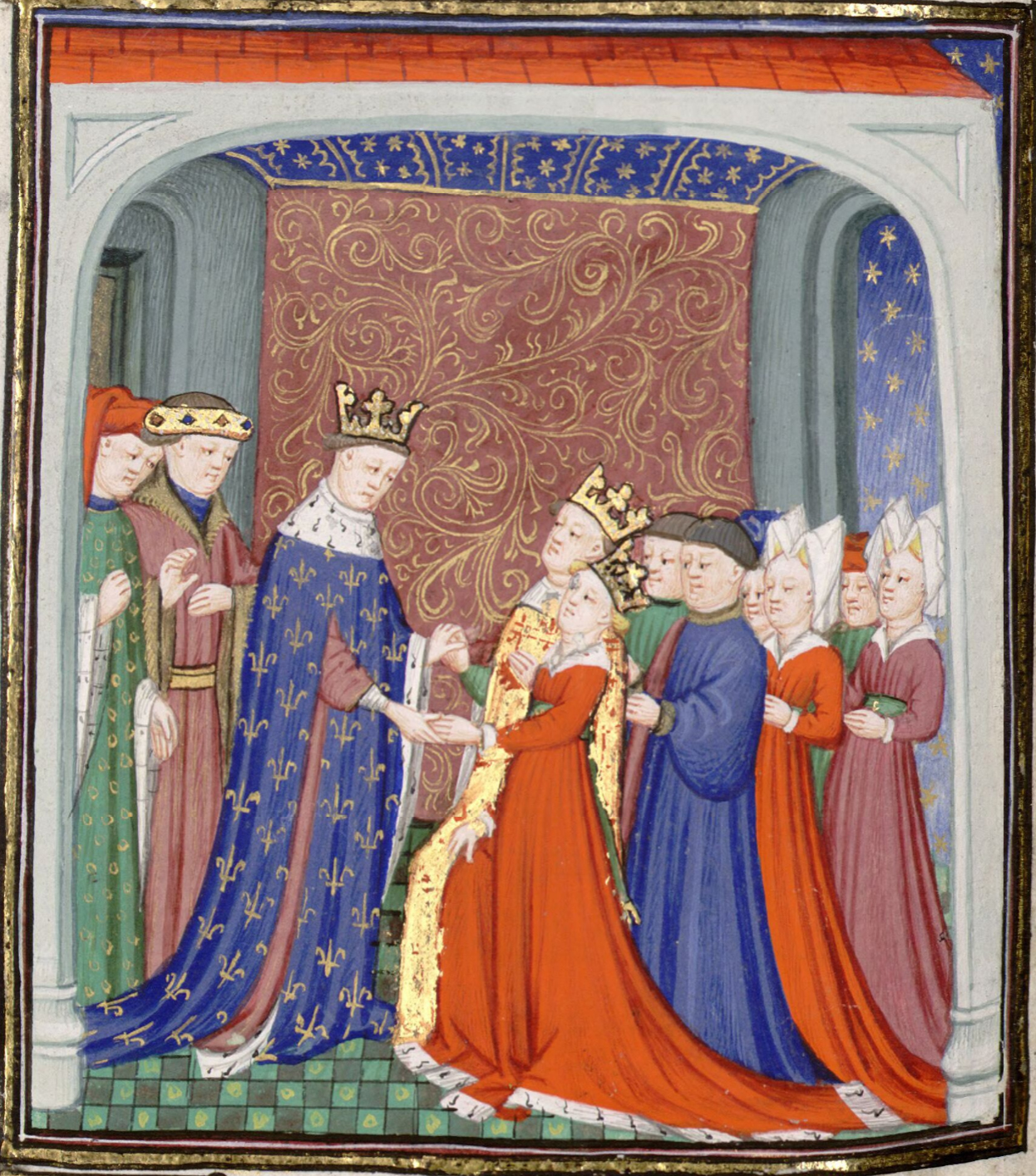
Joan of the Tower & David II with Philip VI of France

Following the English victory at the Battle of Halidon Hill in July 1333, David and his wife were sent for safety into France, reaching Boulogne on 14 May 1334. They were received very graciously by King Philip VI. Little is known about the life of the Scottish king in France, except that Château Gaillard was given to him for a residence, and that he was present at the bloodless meeting of the English and French armies in October 1339 at Vironfosse, now known as Buironfosse, in the Arrondissement of Vervins. He led a raid on the Channel Islands in 1336 that was so devastating that the Royal Militia of the Island of Jersey was created, making it the oldest British Army unit.

By 1341, David's representatives had again obtained the upper hand in Scotland. David was able to return to his kingdom, landing at Inverbervie in Kincardineshire on 2 June 1341. He took the reins of government into his own hands, at the age of 17.

=== Captivity in England ===
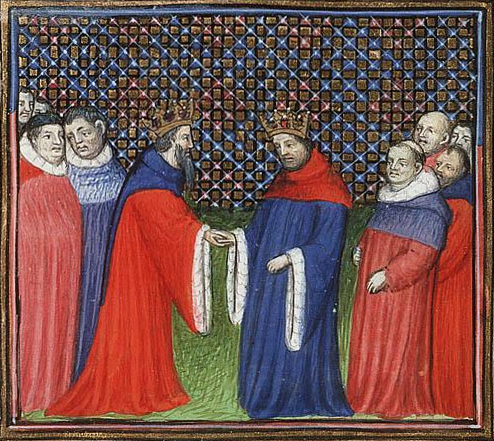
David II, king of Scotland, acknowledges Edward III, king of England, as his feudal lord, an event that never happened.

In 1346, under the terms of the Auld Alliance, David invaded England to try to draw King Edward away from the French, who had been invaded by the English and badly defeated at the battle of Crécy. After initial success at Hexham, David's army was soundly defeated at the battle of Neville's Cross on 17 October 1346. David suffered two arrow wounds to the face and was captured and taken prisoner by Sir John de Coupland. The king was taken to Wark on Tweed, and then to Bamburgh Castle, where barber-surgeons from York were brought to treat his serious injuries. David II was transferred to London, where he was imprisoned in the Tower of London in January 1347. David was transferred to Windsor Castle in Berkshire upon the return of Edward III from France. The depiction of David being presented to King Edward III in the play The Raigne of King Edward the Third is fictitious. David and his household were later moved to Odiham Castle in Hampshire. His imprisonment was not reputed to be a rigorous one as was typical of most royal prisoners. However, the fact that from 1355 he was denied contact with any of his subjects may indicate otherwise. He remained captive in England for eleven years.

On 3 October 1357, after several protracted negotiations with the Scots' regency council, a treaty was signed at Berwick-upon-Tweed under which Scotland's nobility agreed to pay 100,000 marks, at the rate of 10,000 marks per year, as a ransom for their king. This was ratified by the Scottish Parliament at Scone on 6 November 1357.

=== Return to Scotland ===
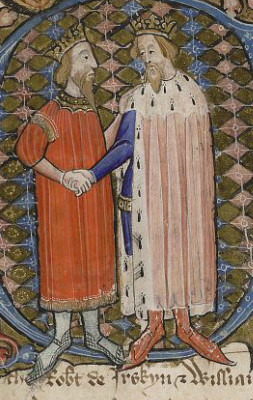
David II (left) and Edward III (right)

David returned to Scotland accompanied by a large contingent of Scottish nobles and clergy. He also brought his mistress, Katherine (or Catherine) Mortimer, of whom little is known. Katherine was murdered in 1360 by men hired by the Earl of Angus and other nobles, according to some sources; some accounts say the earl was starved to death, however since his death was not until 1362, two years after the murder, death from the plague or other causes is more likely. She was replaced as mistress by Margaret Drummond.

After six years, owing to the poverty of the kingdom, it was found impossible to raise the ransom instalment of 1363. David then made for London and sought to get rid of the liability by offering to bequeath Scotland to Edward III, or one of his sons, in return for a cancellation of the ransom. David did this with the full awareness that the Scots would never accept such an arrangement. In 1364, the Scottish parliament indignantly rejected a proposal to make Lionel of Antwerp, Duke of Clarence, the next king. Over the next few years, David strung out secret negotiations with Edward III, which apparently appeased the matter.

His wife, Queen Joan, died on 7 September 1362 (aged 41) at Hertford Castle, Hertfordshire, possibly a victim of the Black Death. He remarried, on about 20 February 1364, to Margaret Drummond, widow of Sir John Logie, and daughter of Sir Malcolm Drummond. He divorced her on about 20 March 1370. They had no children. Margaret, however, travelled to Avignon, and made a successful appeal to the Pope Urban V to reverse the sentence of divorce which had been pronounced against her in Scotland. She was still alive in January 1375, four years after David died.

From 1364, David governed actively, dealing firmly with recalcitrant nobles, and a wider baronial revolt, led by his prospective successor, the future Robert II. David continued to pursue the goal of a final peace with England. At the time of his death, the Scottish monarchy was stronger and the country was "a free and independent kingdom" according to a reliable source. The royal finances were more prosperous than might have seemed possible.

== Relationships ==
King David II of Scotland married twice and had several mistresses, but none of his relationships produced children:

1. Joan of the Tower, the daughter of King Edward II of England and Isabella of France, was David's first wife. David and Joan were married on 17 July 1328, when he was four years old and she was seven. The marriage was in accordance with the terms of the Treaty of Northampton. They were married for 34 years but produced no children. Queen Joan died on 7 September 1362 (aged 41) at Hertford Castle, Hertfordshire;
2. Margaret Drummond was the widow of Sir John Logie, and daughter of Sir Malcolm Drummond. Margaret was David's mistress before the death of Queen Joan, from about 1361. David and Margaret married on 20 February 1364. Still producing no heirs, David attempted to divorce Margaret on 20 March 1370, on the grounds that she was infertile. Pope Urban V, however, reversed the divorce. When David died on 22 February 1371, Margaret and David were still actually married, according to Rome. Margaret died sometime after 31 January 1375, and her funeral was paid for by Pope Gregory XI;
3. Agnes Dunbar was David's mistress at the time of his death. He was planning to marry her; however, the marriage was delayed by the reversal of his divorce to Margaret.

== Death ==
David II died unexpectedly of natural causes at Edinburgh Castle on 22 February 1371, aged forty-six. David was not buried – as he had previously planned – beside his parents at Dunfermline Abbey, but before the high altar of Holyrood Abbey. This choice may have been made because Holyrood was the closest church at hand, only a mile away from Edinburgh Castle, and because David's successor wished to quickly draw a line under the previous reign. The funeral was overseen by Abbot Thomas. As David II left no children, he was the last male of the House of Bruce and was succeeded by his nephew, Robert II, the son of David's half-sister Marjorie.

== Fictional portrayals ==
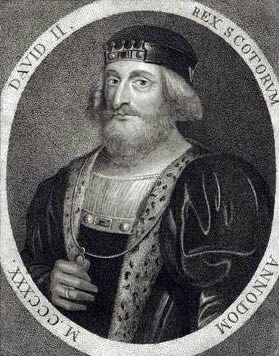
Depiction of David II by Sylvester Harding (1797)

David II has been depicted in historical novels. They include:

- Cressy and Poictiers; or, the Story of the Black Prince's Page (1865) by John George Edgar (1834–1864). The novel depicts events of the years 1344 to 1370, with an epilogue in 1376. The events depicted cover part of the Hundred Years' War and the "Scotch Border Wars" (Second War of Scottish Independence), with the Battle of Neville's Cross (1346) being a key part of the plot. David II is one of the "principal characters", alongside Edward III of England, Philippa of Hainault, and Edward the Black Prince;
- Flowers of Chivalry (1988), by Nigel Tranter, covers events of the Second War of Scottish Independence from 1332 to 1339. David II is a secondary character, the protagonists being Alexander Ramsay of Dalhousie and William Douglas, Lord of Liddesdale;
- Vagabond (2002) by Bernard Cornwell.

David II also appears as a character in the Elizabethan play Edward III and also in the 2012 grand strategy game Crusader Kings II as the monarch of Scotland in 1336.

== See also ==
- List of British monarchs
- List of Scottish monarchs
- Scottish monarchs' family tree
- Robert the Bruce
- Elizabeth de Burgh
- Clan Bruce
- House of Burgh

== Sources ==
- David Nash Ford (2004), Royal Berkshire History: David II, King of Scots (1324–1371).
- John of Fordun (1871–1872), Chronica gentis Scotorum, edited by William Forbes Skene, Edinburgh.
- John Hill Burton (1905), History of Scotland, vol. II, Edinburgh.
- Andrew Lang (1900), History of Scotland, vol. I, Edinburgh.
- Macnamee, Colm (2006), The Wars of the Bruces: England and Ireland 1306–1328, Edinburgh: Donald, ISBN 978-0859766531.
- Nield, Jonathan (1968), A Guide to the Best Historical Novels and Tales, Ayer Publishing, ISBN 978-0-8337-2509-7
- Penman, Michael (2014). Robert the Bruce: King of the Scots. New Haven: Yale University Press. ISBN 978-0300148725.
- Shattock, Joanne (2000), The Cambridge Bibliography of English Literature, Volume 4; Volumes 1800–1900, Cambridge University Press, ISBN 978-0-521-39100-9
- Andrew of Wyntoun (1872–1879), The orygynale cronykil of Scotland, edited by D. Laing, Edinburgh.

David II of Scotland House of Bruce Born: 1324 Died: 1371
Regnal titles
Preceded by Robert I	King of Scotland; 1329 – 1371	Succeeded by Robert II
New title	Earl of Carrick; 1324 – 1329	Reverted to crown
