= Indigenous uses of yellow cedar =

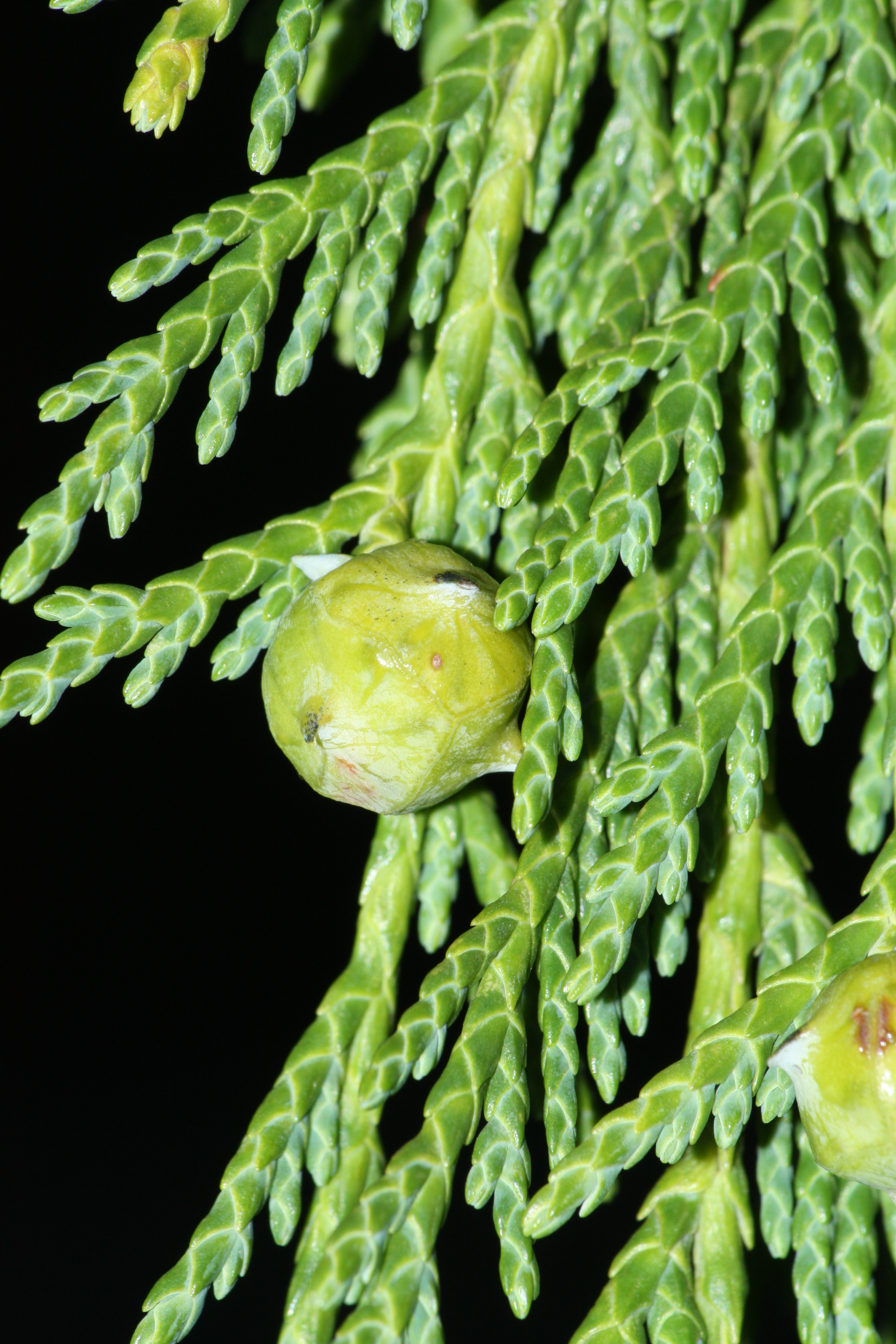
Withes and twigs of the yellow cedar are used for ropes or baskets.

Yellow cedar (Cupressus nootkatensis) is a culturally, economically and environmentally significant species to the Pacific Northwest and was used extensively by Indigenous Peoples throughout the region.

== History ==
=== Archaeological evidence of use ===
At the Ozette Indian Village Archeological Site in Washington, cedar (either yellow or red) wood, bark, and roots, along with the remains of cedar houses were found all dating between 300 and 500 years ago. On the east coast of Vancouver Island at the Little Qualicum River site cedar (either yellow or red) rope, matting, and a canoe bailer were found dating to approximately 1000 years ago. At the Lachane site in Prince Rupert Harbor, many cedar (either yellow or red) wooden items and bark baskets were found dating to approximately 2000 years ago. At the Pitt River site near Vancouver, two carved cedar (either yellow or red) items and baskets were found, dating to approximately 2900 years ago. At the Musqueam site near Vancouver, cedar (either yellow or red) basketry, matting, ropes were found dating to 3000 years ago. At various other sites around Vancouver, woodworking tools have been found that date from between 5000 and 8000 years ago that could possibly have been intended to be used for cedar (either yellow or red).

=== Legends ===
==== Tlingit ====
Natsilane was a great hunter and carver. He also hunted with respect for the sea lions he killed. His older brothers-in-law were jealous of his talents. One day when they had paddled far out to a sea lion rock to hunt, Natsilane speared a sea lion but it dove into the water breaking off the spear tip. When he looked back to the canoe, his older brothers-in-law were paddling away, against the protests of his youngest brother-in-law. Natsilane in despair went to sleep on the rock, and was woken by the chief of the sea lions. He was brought to live in their village beneath the sea. It turned out that he had speared the sea lion chief's son, so Natsilane saved the boy by removing the spearhead from his side. In thanks, the sea lions sent him home in an inflated sealskin bladder. Once home, he visited his wife in secret and had her bring him his carving tools. He set about carving a killer whale, an animal that had yet to exist. First he tried spruce, but that sank when he placed it in a tide pool. Next, he tried hemlock, which also sank. He then tried red cedar, which circled, but then also came to rest on the bottom of the pool. Finally, he tried yellow cedar, his best carving yet. This jumped from the tide pool out to sea. He called the first killer whale back to him and told it to kill his older brothers-in-law when they next went in their canoe to hunt, but to save the youngest brother-in-law. The killer whale capsized the canoe, drowning the older brothers-in-law but brought the youngest back to shore on its back. When the killer whale returned, Natsilane instructed the whale to never again harm humans.

==== Hesquiat ====
Raven the trickster came upon three young women drying salmon on the beach. Being hungry, and interested in stealing their salmon he asked them if they were afraid of being alone. They answered no, so he asked if they were afraid of bears, to which they also answered no. He went through a long list of animals, all of which the young women said they were not afraid of until he mentioned owls. The women confessed they were very afraid of owls. Raven walked away and hid himself in some bushes nearby, where he began to mimic owl calls. The women were terrified, and ran up the mountainside. When they were halfway up and could run no more, they turned into yellow cedar trees. This is said to be why cedars are beautiful, growing silky bark like a woman's hair, graceful limbs, and why their young trunks are smooth to touch. This is also why they grow high on the slopes of Vancouver Island.

== Wood ==
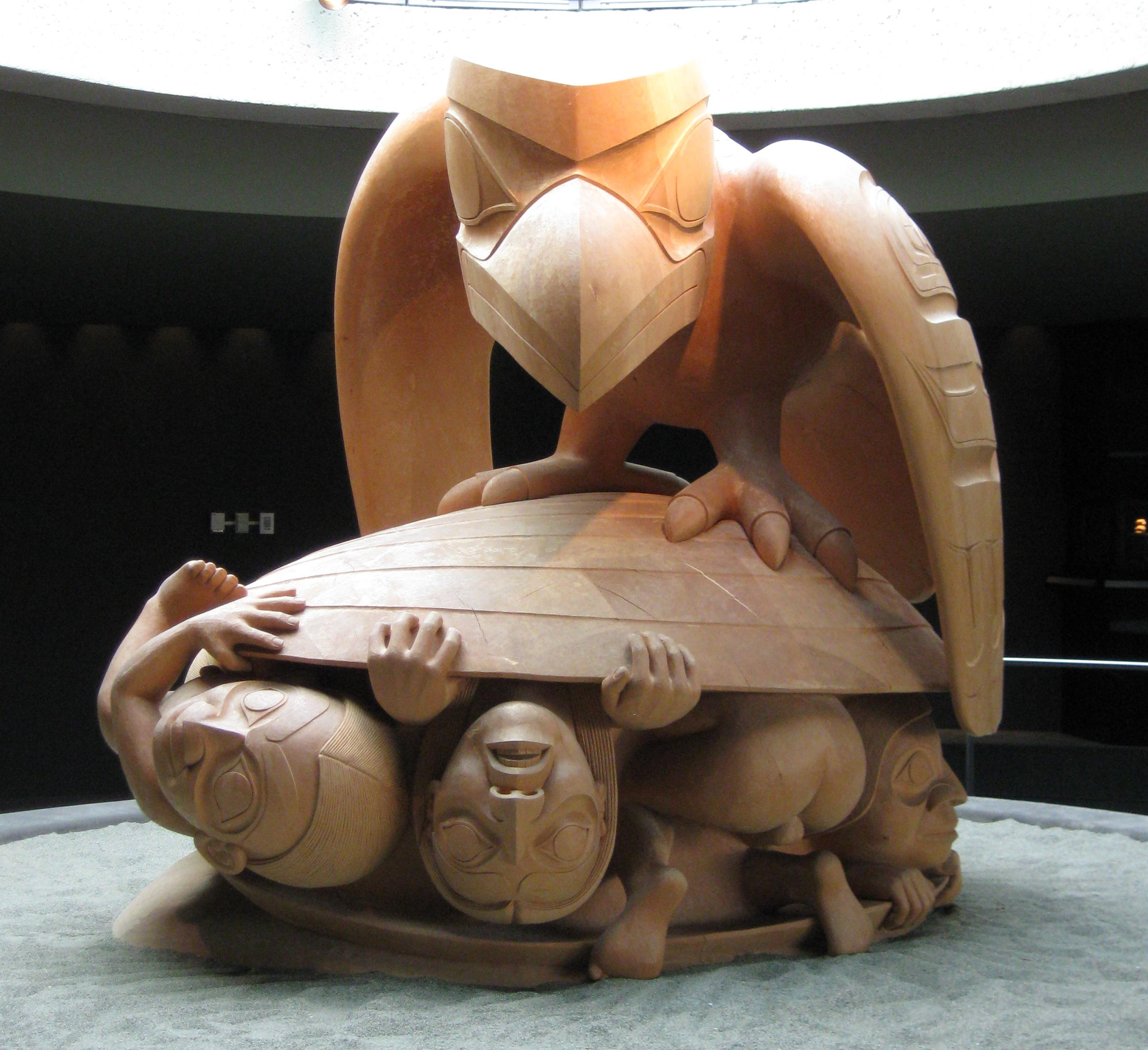
Bill Reid Raven (UBC-2010a)

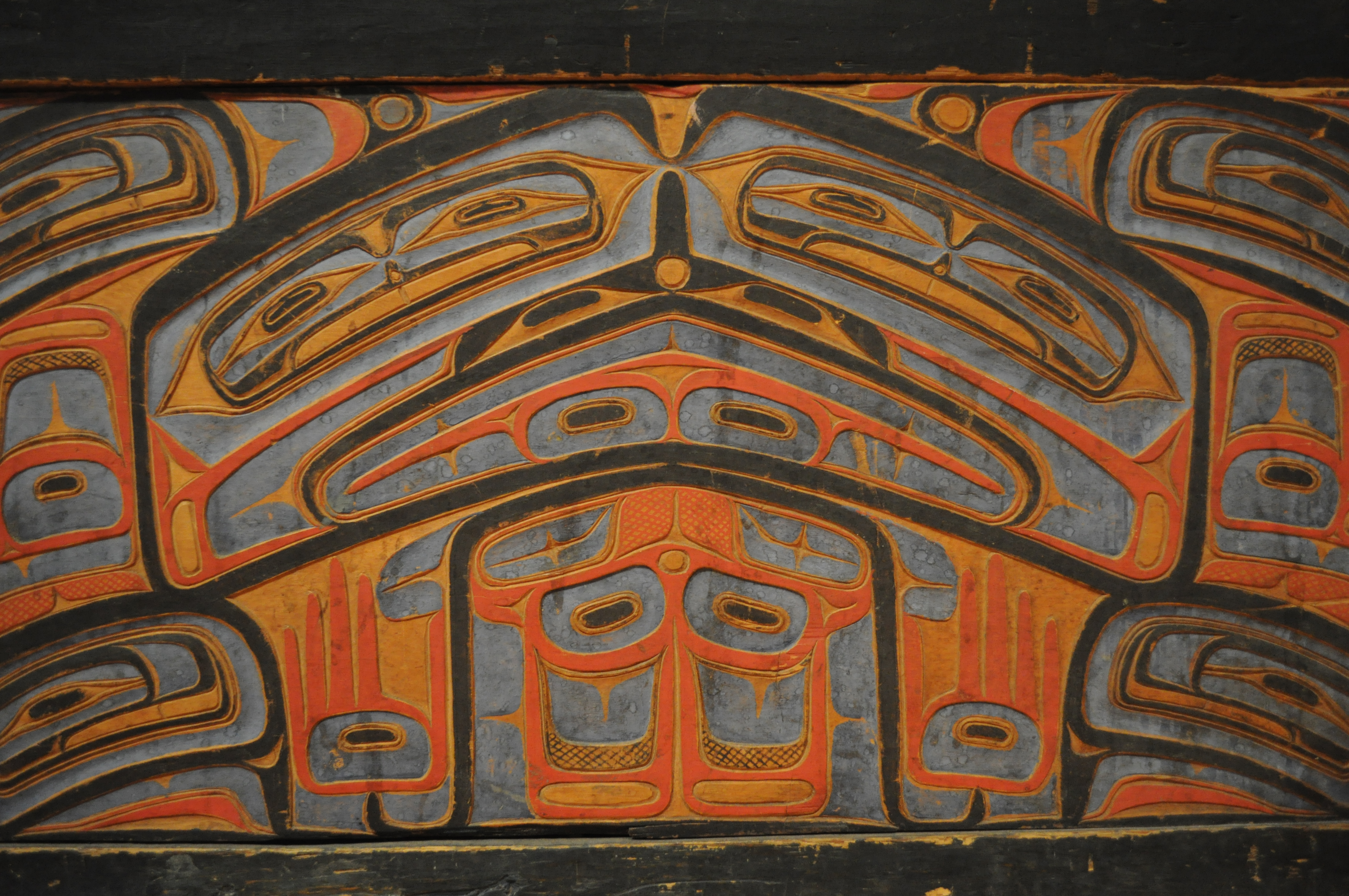
Richard Carpenter bent-wood chest detail 01

Yellow cedar's common name comes from the color of its wood, which is pale yellow. The wood is durable, fine grained, contains a natural preservative, and does not split as easily as red cedar, making it very suitable for carving. it is also lightweight, pliable, yet strong, and was used to make paddles, fishing floats, rattles, ceremonial masks, speaker's staffs which were used as a badge of office for an announcer at events, bentwood bowls, totem poles, and longhouses. Bentwood boxes were made by using steam to bend a single plank of red cedar into four sides of a box, and then using yellow cedar pegs to join the corner. These boxes were highly prized and thus were a valuable trade item. They could be used to hold and store goods, or as coffins for the deceased. Coast Salish hunters used yellow cedar saplings to make bows which were also used in trade.

=== Harvesting ===
Harvesting of trees was typically done from late summer to early spring. This was to avoid the time when the sap was up as it sped the rotting of the tree.

==== Felling a tree by burning and adzing ====
A cavity was chiseled into the tree with an adze, and then red hot rocks were applied for controlled burning, with wet hemlock branches placed around the cavity to control the spread of the burn. The tree feller would chop away the charcoal, renewing the treatment of hot rocks as needed.

==== Felling a tree by burning ====
Fire was applied to the base of the tree. A ring of wet clay circled the tree above the fire to control burning.

==== Felling a tree with hammer, wedge, and maul ====
A scaffold and platform was built around the tree above the flaring roots. Two chiseled grooves about one foot apart were made around the tree and then the wood between cut away with a hammer and maul. The process was repeated until the tree fell.

== Tools ==
=== Hammer ===
The earliest form of the hammer used when carving yellow cedar was the hammer stone, a hard rock worn smooth by water that was resistant to cracking or flaking. Northern and Southern peoples later developed their own respective hammers. Southern peoples used the hand maul which was held directly in the hand, while northern nations (Tsimshian, Haida, and Tlingit) used hafted mauls, which were heavy stone heads lashed onto a long haft, similar to a sledge hammer. Many of the stone mauls were sculpted as animal figurines.

=== Wedge ===
Wedges when hammered were used to split cedar logs into planks. A variety of woods including yew, spruce, maple, and crabapple were used as wedges. The wood was beveled on one end to allow it to be driven into the cedar, and then scorched to improve its hardness. Animal fat was rubbed into the wood to prevent warping, and a cedar with was twisted around the top end to prevent splitting when struck with a hammer. Antler was also historically used as an alternative to wood wedges.

=== Adze ===
The most universal adze was the elbow adze, named for its shape. Metal blades have been found on adzes for several hundred years, and currently very little evidence of stone blades usage exists. Elbow adzes were used for chopping and rough shaping, and were typically used on large works. D adzes were also used from Vancouver island southward. Their name comes from the shape of their haft, which were often carved to represent animals. The D adze was used for finer work and for finishing.

=== Other tools ===
Chisels, scrapers, knives, awls, and sandstones to keep the tools sharp were important additional components of a woodcarver's tool chest.

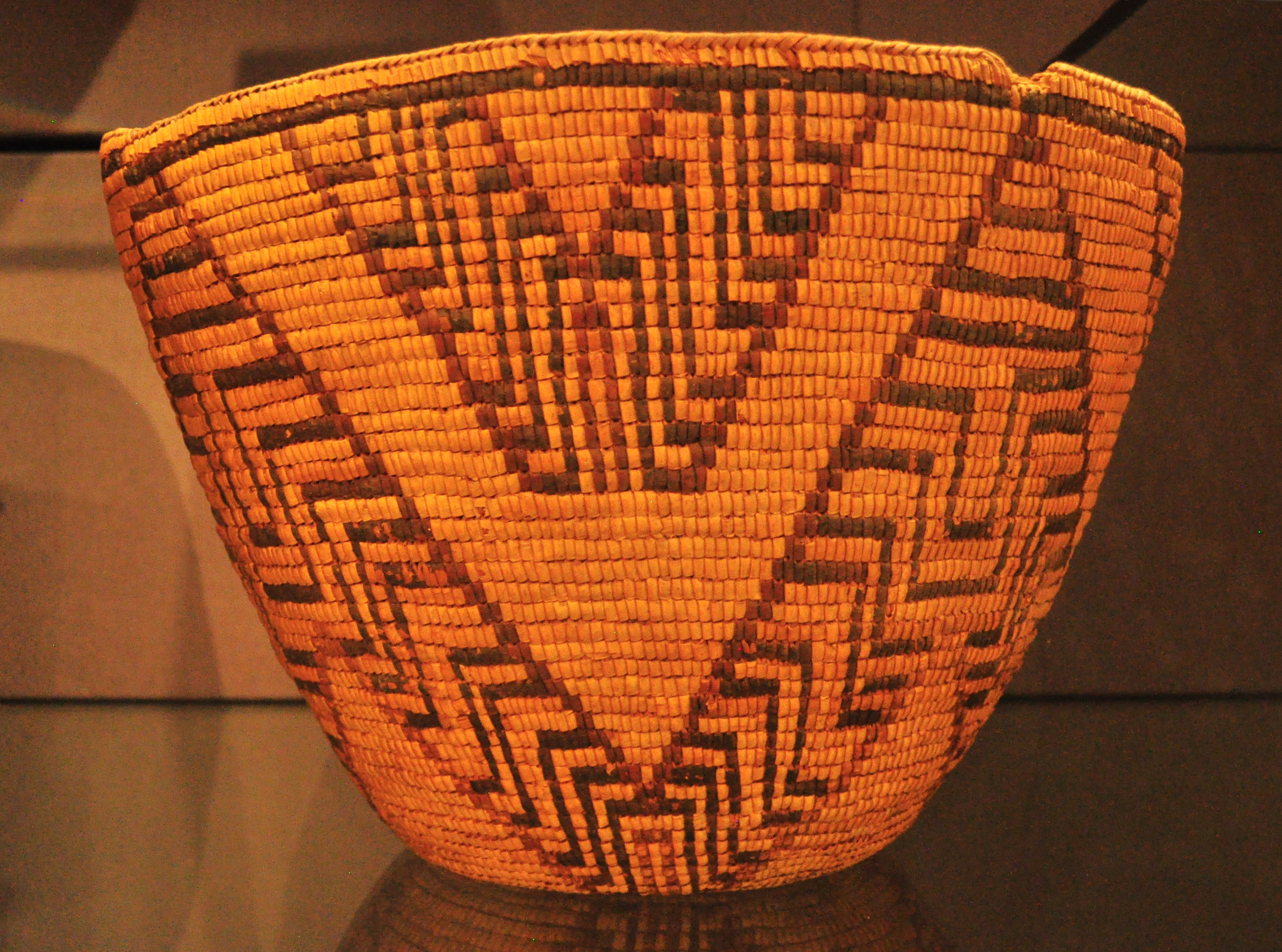
Hibulb Cultural Center - watertight cedar basket c. 1920 (20873657113)

== Bark ==
The inner bark of yellow cedar was valued over the inner bark of red cedar because it is more durable. The inner bark is very versatile and could be dyed and used as different types of thread to create mats, clothing, blankets, basketry, fishing nets, ropes, and hats, the bark is also soft and absorbent, and was used for diapers, sanitary napkins, and bedding as well. Yellow cedar was the only bark used for the core of the warp for Chilkat weaving, due to its strength.

=== Harvesting ===
Bark was cut and pulled as soon as the sap began to run, which varied regionally from late May to July. While carving was typically done by men, the harvesting of bark was performed by women. Straight young trees were chosen, and only a portion was debarked to ensure the tree's survival. Thousands of culturally modified trees with scars from past bark harvesting can now be found along the Pacific Northwest coastline. On the side with the fewest branches, above the flare of the tree's roots, a woman would make a horizontal cut the width of two fingers. She would make a small vertical cut then on either end of the horizontal cut. She would then use a small wedge to pry the bark away from the trunk enough for her to grip securely. Holding this end of the bark, she would then walk away from the tree slowly, drawing a ribbon of bark off the tree. For the bark quality to prove good for weaving, the strip should run at least twenty feet before narrowing to a point.

== Roots ==
Roots could be dried and then braided to form cords for weaving hats or basketry. Using specific techniques, the baskets could be made water and heat proof, and could be used as cookware.

== Withes ==
Withes were used to create strong cords for lashing and ropes. They were a valuable construction tool, and were often used in place nails or bolts. Because of their strength, they were also used to create burden baskets for heavy loads.

== See also ==
- Thuja plicata, for Indigenous use
