= Karine Charlebois =

Canadian comic book and animation artist (born 1974)

Karine Charlebois (born August 18, 1974, in Sainte-Thérèse, Quebec) is a Canadian comic book and animation storyboard supervisor who worked on the Gargoyles comic and its spin-off, Badguys.

== Career ==
Charlebois has degrees in Business Administration/Marketing from École des Hautes Études Commerciales and Arts & Communications from Collège André-Grasset and Collège Ahuntsic. She began her career at Cinar working on storyboard corrections on Arthur, then moved on to CinéGroupe working first on storyboard corrections, then as a storyboard artist on Mega Babies and Sagwa, the Chinese Siamese Cat. While her storyboarding experience includes work on several video games published by Microïds, Post Mortem and Syberia II, most of her portfolio is in traditional animation such as Arthur, Martha Speaks, Inspector Gadget, F Is for Family, and My Little Pony: Friendship Is Magic.

After meeting Gargoyles creator Greg Weisman during the Gathering of the Gargoyles convention, she worked with Slave Labor Graphics as the lead artist in the Bad Guys comic, and as a pickup artist on issue #5 of the main Gargoyles comic.
