= Legacy hero =

Type of superhero

Legacy heroes are a type of superhero whose codenames and/or personas are passed from pre-existing characters to newer characters. This often can come in the form of a descendant and/or relative of the pre-existing hero adopting or inheriting either the codename and/or attributes of the original.

== Overview ==
The term is often referred to characters published by DC Comics and Marvel Comics; Family franchises such as DC's Batman, Superman, Wonder Woman, Atom, Black Canary, Captain Marvel, The Flash, Green Lantern, Hawkman, Hawkwoman, The Ray and Robin or Marvel's Black Knight, Captain America, Captain Marvel, Hulk, Iron Man, Spider-Man, Thor, Wolverine, have seen several characters take up the name and abilities of the original. In Watchmen, the codename Nite Owl is used by two characters, the second after the first one retires.

In video games, the Assassin's Creed, many of the game's characters are descended from bloodlines of Assassins. In the Donkey Kong franchise, it is stated that Cranky Kong is the original Donkey Kong from the 1981 arcade game, while the Donkey Kong in later games is his grandson.

=== Legacy villain ===
In opposition, there have been legacy villains in fiction as well. In comics, examples are DC's Blockbuster, Captain Boomerang, and Clayface; Marvel's Green Goblin, Mysterio, and Electro.

In Disney's Gargoyles, a multi-generational line of villains known as the Hunter share the same scar on their faces.
