= List of Gargoyles characters =

This page contains a list of characters in the animated television series Gargoyles (1994–97) and the spinoff comic books.

== Gargoyles ==
In the Gargoyles universe, several clans of gargoyles exist worldwide, each with distinct cultural and morphological characteristics. The clans are similar in that they each have a particular item, area, or concept that they strive to protect. Gargoyles are fierce warriors and incredibly powerful and resilient. Their appearance (most are large with wings and claws) and ferocity often mean that humans vilify them as demons and monsters. Most gargoyles do not peacefully co-exist with humans.

Gargoyles in the series are particularly notable for entering a sort of stone hibernation, called "stone sleep", during the day, when they resemble Gothic statues. In this state they can quickly heal from injury and illness and are protected from most natural threats. However, this leaves them vulnerable to attack and death: if a gargoyle is destroyed during their hibernation such as by being shattered to pieces, their body will remain stone and they will never wake up again.

A subgroup of gargoyles are gargoyle beasts, who are typically quadrupedal and behave like domestic animals. Though they are smarter than mundane animals, they are not as intelligent as humans or gargoyles.

=== The Manhattan Clan ===
The Manhattan Clan are the protagonists of the series, and gain new members as the series progresses.

- Goliath (voiced by Keith David) The leader of the Manhattan Clan. Goliath is named for the biblical giant by the people of Castle Wyvern because of his large stature. Before his clan's awakening in Manhattan, Goliath was the only gargoyle with a name. By the end of the second season, Goliath has started a romantic relationship with Elisa Maza.
- Hudson (voiced by Ed Asner) An Elder and former leader of the Wyvern Clan. He now serves as an advisor to Goliath and the rest of the Manhattan Clan. Hudson took his name from the river after Elisa explained almost everything has a name. When not in battle, Hudson would spend the night watching television.
- Brooklyn (voiced by Jeff Bennett) The rufous-skinned, white-haired Brooklyn serves as the clan's second-in-command with a somewhat sarcastic and impetuous attitude, but has a talent for tactics. Brooklyn is named for the New York borough. He harbors bitter hatred against Demona after she tricked him. Forty seconds after being whisked away in time by The Phoenix Gate (but 40 years later, from Brooklyn's perspective), Brooklyn was returned to his correct time, older and with a family.
- Lexington (voiced by Thom Adcox-Hernandez) The smallest of the clan and a technical wizard. Lexington is named from the avenue, which itself gained that name in 1836. Lexington harbored bitter hatred against The Pack, but attempted to reconcile with Fox after moving back to the castle. Unlike the other Manhattan Clan gargoyles, Lexington's wings do not exist as fully "separate" limbs, but instead consist of membranes that are webbed to his arms with one extra set of "limbs" halfway down within the webbing, which allow him to glide like a flying squirrel. He holds a soft spot for baby Alex; in the third season, he is shown to act as a sort of babysitter and spoils him with new toys.
- Broadway (voiced by Bill Fagerbakke) An overweight and good-natured gargoyle. He is named for the street. Broadway has developed a strong dislike of guns ever since he accidentally shot Elisa with her own gun, and has a great appreciation for old movies (particularly detective/noir films), as well as a newfound and rapidly developing appreciation for reading and literary works. He later develops a relationship with Angela.
- Bronx (vocal effects provided by Frank Welker) A dog-like gargoyle beast who is named for the New York borough. He often stays with Hudson within the clan's residence, keeping him company while watching television.
- Angela (voiced by Brigitte Bako) The daughter of Goliath and Demona. She was raised on Avalon like a human, thus making her more willing to trust others, and joined the Manhattan clan in the middle of the second season. Angela is so named because of her angelic nature, Angela literally meaning "She-Angel". She later develops a relationship with Broadway, after letting "the trio" (Broadway, Brooklyn and Lexington) know she does not tolerate nicknames being used for her.
- Fu-Dog A green leonine gargoyle beast, closely resembling a Chinese statuary lion in appearance from the Xanadu Clan in China who, at some unspecified time, joins Brooklyn on his journey through the time-stream. He is fiercely loyal to Brooklyn.
- Katana She comes from the Ishimura Clan during feudal era Japan, and is Brooklyn's sky-blue hued mate with a similar but smaller beak when compared to her mate. Named for the most famous form of Japanese sword, she joined him on his Timedancer journey. During their adventures, she and Brooklyn had an egg which hatched into Nashville. She has a second egg, Egwardo, which she is very protective of, as shown by her carrying it (before it hatches in 1998) with her everywhere in a compact backpack.
- Nashville The son of Brooklyn and Katana. He closely resembled Brooklyn, but had Katana's pale blue skin color and bluish-black hair. He is called Gnash for short.
- Egwardo A yet-to-be-hatched gargoyle egg. Its parents were Brooklyn and Katana. Egwardo hatched as a female in 1998, and was given the name "Tachi", possibly named for the predecessor of the sword her mother is named for.
- Othello (voiced by Michael Dorn) A rookery brother to Goliath who is shown to be hot-headed. Having been shattered by Hakon's Viking army during his stone sleep, Othello was resurrected as the cyborg Coldstone by David Xanatos. The Coldstone robot was designed to resemble him. The name Othello was used to identify the character in the script. He rejoined the clan in 1997.
- Desdemona (voiced by CCH Pounder) A gargoyle and Othello's mate who was shattered by Hakon's Viking army during her cold sleep and was revived in the Coldstone body by David Xanatos. She helped to keep Iago at bay and was eventually transferred into the robot shell of Coldfire. The name Desdemona was used only for script and credit sequences. She rejoined the clan in 1997.

=== Coldstone ===
Coldstone is the spirit of three deceased gargoyle from the Wyvern clan resurrected through science and sorcery into a cyborg body by David Xanatos. He was formed from the remains of three different gargoyles (usually called Coldstone or "Othello", his mate Coldfire or "Desdemona", and his rival Coldsteel or "Iago"), and each personality remains mostly intact. Eventually, each personality is transferred to a separate robotic body. Since the Coldstone robotic body only had one voice box, Coldstone was always voiced by Michael Dorn, regardless of the personality in control. However, in "Legion" when Coldstone's tone changed whenever Desdemona was in control, Coldstone is voiced by CCH Pounder.

=== Iago/Coldsteel ===
Iago or Coldsteel (voiced by Xander Berkeley) is Othello's enemy. He convinced Othello that Desdemona was secretly pursuing a relationship with Goliath. Having been shattered by Hakon's Viking army, Iago was eventually transferred into the robot shell of Coldsteel. Upon Demona's reactivation of the Coldstone robot, Iago took control of the body, until Othello was convinced to help Goliath and clan. In 1996, Coldsteel aided Xanatos and Coyote 5.0. in retrieving the Stone of Destiny in exchange for removing a tracking device from his body. The name Iago was used only in the script and credits.

=== Demona ===
Demona

Demona (voiced by Marina Sirtis) is the main antagonist of the series, driven by a hatred of humanity. She is Goliath's ex-mate and Angela's biological mother; who is no longer frozen in stone by daylight like the others, thanks to Puck's pre-Gathering intervention. She has been continuously alive for a millennium, because of a magical pact with Macbeth granted to them by the series' version of the Three Witches, giving both of them nearly-irrevocable immortality. Demona developed a hatred of all humans, making her an enemy of the clan. She was named by Macbeth, after her demonic fighting skills, Demona literally meaning "She-Demon". Over the centuries that she has been alive, Demona was the enemy of the Canmore family, who all took on the moniker of The Hunter; because of this, Demona was indirectly responsible for the destruction of the Manhattan Clan's clock tower home.

The Mary Sue's Jessica Mason described Demona as the "perfect complex villain," writing "Oftentimes, villains are one-note and not nuanced, or they’re too evil and all we want is to see them defeated. But a great villain is one we can maybe sorta understand, who doesn’t see themself as a villain." "Demona was sympathetic. I'm not saying that I agree with her methods or where she landed in her world view, but viewers could understand why she did what she did and felt what she felt. Demona was always defiant and ambitious, but centuries of human betrayal and seeing the worst in men radicalized her. She represented the ultimate form of cynicism about humanity, and sometimes it felt justified... Demona is a great example of a villain that is so much fun to watch and even kinda fun to root for. She was an icon of so many childhoods because she was complicated, powerful, badass, and fun."

=== Avalon Clan ===
The Avalon Clan are the gargoyle eggs of Castle Wyvern that were protected by Princess Katharine, Tom, and the Magus. The eggs were taken to Avalon where they hatched and grew to adulthood where they formed this offshoot of the Wyvern Clan. Katharine and Tom raised them as their own children, and thus gave each a name to be told apart from each other, so the Avalon Clan holds great respect for them.

Known members of the clan include:

- Gabriel (voiced by Ruben Santiago-Hudson) – The son of Coldstone and Coldfire.
- Ophelia (voiced by Kath Soucie) – A turquoise gargoyle with a distinct wing feature and spikes on her forearms.
- Boudicca (vocal effects provided by Frank Welker) – A slender dog-shaped gargoyle beast.

The unnamed members of the Avalon clan consist of 14 unnamed females, 16 unnamed males, and two gargoyle beasts.

=== London Clan ===
The London Clan are a prosperous English clan resembling the creatures of heraldry. The London Clan roosted at a country estate called Knight's Spur. They also ran a magic shop in London to supplement their income and until the mid-1990s (the timeframe of the Gargoyles series), the London Clan had abandoned their mission of protection.

Their names were derived from the heraldic creatures they were based on:

- Una (voiced by Sarah Douglas) – A unicorn-type gargoyle and the clan's leader.
- Leo (voiced by Gregg Berger) – A lion-type gargoyle.
- Griff (voiced by Neil Dickson) – A griffin-type gargoyle who was displaced in 1995 when he went through the Phoenix Gate.
- Staghart – A white stag-type gargoyle who was rumored to have a close friendship with Lexington.
- Constance – A wild boar-type gargoyle, whom is second-in-command to Una.
- Pog – A hippogriff-type gargoyle who is the clan's eldest member.
- Lunette – A winged unicorn-type gargoyle. She is Leo and Una's daughter who was born the same year as Brooklyn's son Nashville.

The rest of the London Clan consisted of 189 unnamed members.

=== Ishimura Clan ===
Ishimura Clan (Japanese for "stone village") was a gargoyle clan in Japan and the only clan thus far that lived in harmony with humans, teaching them Bushido, (lit. the "Way of the Warrior"), since feudal times. It includes:

- Kai (voiced by Clyde Kusatsu) – Ishimura Clan's leader.
- Sora (voiced by Haunani Minn) – A member of the Clan and Kai's second-in-command.
- Yama (voiced by Bruce Locke) – A member of the Clan and Sora's former mate who was banished from the clan for criminal activity. This resulted in his joining Robyn Canmore's Redemption Squad unit in the future to atone for his own misdeeds.

Ishimura Clan also had many other unnamed members. In the Gargoyles comic series issue "The Lost", it is revealed that the gargoyles of Japan are properly called Tengu as a possible inspiration for Japan's folkloric creatures with similar physical characteristics.

=== Mayan Clan ===
The Mayan Clan members are protectors of the Guatemalan rainforest and associated with the Kaqchikel people's culture and have patagia-like leathery wings. The four surviving gargoyles of the clan wear special talismans linked to a special artifact called the Mayan Sun Amulet that allows them to avoid stone sleep. Their names are Spanish words for precious gemstones:

- Zafiro (voiced by Héctor Elizondo) – The red-skinned leader of the Mayan Clan. He has a serpentine appearance with feathered wings reminiscent of the deities Kukulkan and Quetzalcoatl. He wears the sapphire amulet.
- Jade (voiced by Jesse Corti) – A green-skinned Gargoyle with a facial appearance reminiscent of Goliath. His name is pronounced /ˈhɑːdeɪ/ HAH-day in Spanish and he wears the jade amulet.
- Turquesa (voiced by Marabina Jaimes) – A blue-skinned gargoyle. She wears the turquoise amulet.
- Obsidiana (voiced by Elisa Gabrielli) – A blue-skinned gargoyle and Zafiro's mate who has developed skills as an herbalist (similar to Maya ethnobotany) with medicinal plants of the rain forest, in healing physical injuries. She wears the obsidian amulet.

Due to malicious business actions initiated in 1993 by the Cyberbiotics Corporation's Preston Vogel in and near the clan's rainforest protectorate (see below), a sizable number of the Guatemala Clan's earlier gargoyle membership was destroyed.

=== Labyrinth Clan ===
The Labyrinth Clan lived underground, protecting the homeless individuals who also lived there.

==== The Mutates ====
The Mutates were created when Anton Sevarius combined animal genes with humans in an attempt to create gargoyle-like creatures for Xanatos. They rebelled against Xanatos, and now protect the homeless in the underground facility known as the Labyrinth. They also take care of the Manhattan clan's clones. All the Mutates have DNA from felines, bats, and electric eels, allowing them to fly and generate electricity.

===== Talon =====
Talon (voiced by Rocky Carroll) is a black panther/bat-like mutate who is the leader of the Mutate Clan. Originally, he was against leadership as he preferred everyone being equal, but took control when Fang attempted mutiny. Talon was originally Elisa Maza's younger brother Derek. He took a job as a pilot for David Xanatos with a series of events leading to his mutation. The mutate Maggie Reed is shown to love him and the feeling is mutual.

===== Fang =====
Fang (voiced by Jim Belushi) is a cougar/bat-like mutate who joined forces with Thailog and Demona. Fang is a loud mouthed bully who likes dominating those weaker than himself, which causes Yama to become antagonistic towards him.

===== Claw =====
Claw is a Bengal tiger/bat-like mutate who was rendered mute by his transformation, either due to physical damage or psychological trauma. Claw is shown to be a coward, doing what he is told out of fear. However, he has brief moments of bravery.

===== Maggie Reed =====
Maggie "The Cat" Reed (voiced by Kath Soucie) is a homeless woman who was tricked by Sevarius into being a "temporary assistant" at Gen-U-Tech where she was transformed into a lion/bat-like mutate. She is the most desperate to find a cure for her condition. In the comic continuation, it is revealed that she is pregnant with Talon's child.

===== Xanatos' Mutate Army =====
Xanatos' Mutate Army are a group of mutants from "Future Tense" who are clones of Talon.

===== Armored Mutates =====
To continue with his experiments in mutating for an unknown client, Sevarius and Fang abducted four residents of the Labyrinth who are humans spiced with the DNA of an armored animal.

- Thug – An African-East Indian homeless man. Thug was in charge of guarding Fang's cell before Fang was freed by Sevarius. Mutated into a humanoid crocodile. He took Benny and Erin back to the Labyrinth.
- Tasha – Tasha was a woman who was mutated into a humanoid armadillo. She committed suicide by hanging after discovering that Sevarius had no intent to cure them.
- Benny – Benny is a boy who was mutated into a humanoid woodlouse.
- Erin – Erin is Benny's older sister. She was mutated into a humanoid turtle.

Benny and Erin are modeled after the children of series creator Greg Weisman. They got to choose which mutated forms that their comic book versions were given.

=== Thailog ===
Thailog (voiced by Keith David) is a clone of Goliath created by Anton Sevarius and educated by David Xanatos (via a "subliminal education program"), giving him many of Xanatos's personality traits. He would prove to be both a genius and a persistent enemy. Thailog debuts in the season 2 episode "Double Jeopardy", which aired in November 1995, and his name is almost backwards for "Goliath". When Owen Burnett cleaned Goliath's wound from a drone attack, the blood on the cloth he used was secretly given to Sevarius. A "monster", in Xanatos' words. Goliath's body and Xanatos' mind. Deciding that he would never be free under Xanatos' thumb, Thailog planned his own kidnapping by Sevarius, blackmails Xanatos for 20 million dollars for his safe return, and after meeting his genetic source, Goliath, for the first time, seemingly perishes in an explosion. Xanatos later guesses that Thailog had planned to fake his death all along, leaving him both free of Xanatos, and free to spend the 20 million without interference. Xanatos realizes that he has created a monster, one as strong as Goliath and as smart as (if not smarter than) himself.

Under the name "Alexander Thailog", Thailog would later form a partnership/relationship with Demona, (business-wise they formed a company, called "Nightstone Unlimited"), but was planning to let her and Macbeth die to inherit both their fortunes. Demona in her human form planned to marry Macbeth and then claim that he was dead to inherit his fortune. Thailog planned to kill Macbeth and Demona and as her sole business partner, her Banker, he would inherit their combined fortunes. Both of them later commissioned Sevarius to create a clan of clones from the Manhattan Clan's DNA, which he eventually betrayed.

=== The Clones ===
The Clones were made by Anton Sevarius at the request of Demona and Thailog. Their intellects were originally deliberately stunted to make them obedient to Thailog. With Thailog's supposed death, they regained their freedom. Talon offered to take the clones with him to the Labyrinth to educate them.

The clones differ from the originals by their colors and some features like horns or teeth. To gain a physical advantage, Malibu, Brentwood, Hollywood and Burbank were aged to be in their biological 20s: older than the young trio, yet younger than Hudson.

The clones' names are places in Los Angeles, contrasting with and spoofing (as chosen by Demona) their counterpart protagonists' New York City place names.

Issues 3 to 5 of the comic depict Thailog going to Castle Wyvern to persuade the clones to rejoin him as they still had not developed free will at that time. After a battle with Goliath and his clan, most of the clones return to the Labyrinth at the insistence of Delilah. Only Brentwood decides to remain with Thailog.

- Malibu (voiced by Jeff Bennett) – The clone of Brooklyn. There are hints to a possible relationship between Malibu and Delilah (much to the disappointment of Brooklyn, before his initial meeting with his own future mate Katana).
- Brentwood (voiced by Thom Adcox-Hernandez) – The clone of Lexington. Unlike the other clones, he decides to remain with Thailog, viewing him to be smart. He was the only clone to stay out of the fight between the clans.
- Hollywood (voiced by Bill Fagerbakke) – The clone of Broadway.
- Burbank (voiced by Ed Asner) – The clone of Hudson. Much like Hudson, Burbank carries a weapon, in his case, a mace. In addition, he lacks the injured left eye Hudson still possesses.
- Delilah (voiced by Salli Richardson) – Delilah is a binary clone made from 90% of Demona's DNA and 10% of Elisa's DNA. She was programmed to be a servile concubine for Thailog, replacing Demona. Goliath went to the Labyrinth requesting Delilah's company for a Halloween dance (as Elisa had broken up with him). After Thailog crashes the party, Delilah is given the choice to remain with Thailog or go back to The Labyrinth. After deciding to leave Thailog, she asked the other clones to make the same choice, and was joined by all of them except for Brentwood. Delilah was angry that Goliath tried to use her as a replacement for Elisa when they temporarily broke up. Goliath had explained to Elisa that he could never feel anything for Delilah, because Gargoyles mate for life.
- Little Anton (voiced by Dorian Harewood) – A giant gargoyle made by Sevarius using the DNA from all the Manhattan clan gargoyles.

== Humans ==
In addition to the gargoyles, human characters figure prominently in the series, both as allies and enemies of the gargoyles.

=== Residents of Castle Wyvern 954–994 ===
==== Princess Katharine ====
Princess Katharine (voiced by Kath Soucie) is the leader of Castle Wyvern (and, by default, the Scottish clan of gargoyles) during the 990s. Katharine was at first prejudiced against the clan, but after they saved her life, she vowed to protect the clans' unhatched eggs and raise them on Avalon.

==== Katharine's parents ====
- Prince Malcolm (voiced by Roger Rees) was Katharine's father, the previous lord of Wyvern Castle, Hudson's good friend, and brother to King Kenneth. He formed a co-existence alliance with the gargoyles who had been there for centuries, and built Castle Wyvern. Goliath, Demona, and Hudson saved his life from an attack by the Archmage. He also inadvertently inspired hatred of gargoyles at Wyvern, particularly in Princess Katharine—he told her that the gargoyles would get her if she did not stay in bed. He was apparently deceased by the time of the Viking attack in 994.
- Princess Elena (voiced by Kath Soucie) is Katharine's mother. She married Prince Malcolm in 975, and intended to give him the Phoenix Gate as a dowry until it was stolen by Demona.

==== The Magus ====
The Magus (voiced by Jeff Bennett) was a court magician of Castle Wyvern and Katharine's top advisor. It was the Magus who cast the spell that imprisoned Goliath's clan in stone, believing that the Viking Hakon had murdered the Princess and blaming the gargoyles for her death. He later discovered that Princess Katharine had been rescued by Goliath. The spell would place the Gargoyles in stone until their associated castle touches the sky. Unable to restore the gargoyles as Hakon had burned the page with his counterspell, he agreed to place Goliath under the same spell so that he might one day be reunited with his clan. The Magus guided Princess Katharine and the eggs to Avalon, and harbored unrequited feelings for the princess for many years. He died after using a great deal of energy to defeat the Weird Sisters. The spell in question was later broken by David Xanatos.

==== Tom the Guardian ====
In 10th-century Scotland, Tom (voiced by J. D. Daniels as a child, Gerrit Graham as an adult) was a peasant boy at Wyvern Castle, who was eager to make friends with the gargoyles, especially the future-named Lexington & Brooklyn, despite his mother's objections. He also accompanied Princess Katherine and the gargoyle eggs to Avalon, where he took on the role of Guardian, protecting the eggs & training the young gargoyles when they hatched. While living on Avalon, the adult Tom became Katharine's confidante and eventually her husband.

==== Mary ====
Mary (voiced by Kath Soucie), Tom the Guardian's mother, was fiercely anti-gargoyle like Katharine, but had a change of heart as she, too, vowed to protect the eggs. Along with Finnella, she did not go to Avalon, instead choosing to stay on Earth and guard the Grimorum Arcanorum, stating that, "a woman alone might run into trouble: two women can cause plenty of it". When a Timedancing Brooklyn arrived in Scotland in 997, Mary recognized him as one of the gargoyles from Goliath's clan. Together, the three of them joined Constantine's enemies, led by King Kenneth III. She and Finella would continue guarding the Grimorum while leaving 997 with Brooklyn. In October 1996, Mary (or a woman resembling her) attended a Halloween party atop The Eyrie Building.

==== The Archmage ====
The Archmage (voiced by David Warner) was an evil sorcerer and an enemy of the gargoyle clan at Castle Wyvern. He was defeated by Goliath, but his future self saved him from his fall in a perpetual time paradox—as his future self existed in the 1990s, and rescued his past self, without any explanation for how the loop began. The Archmage continues to live through this loop, despite his later defeat, after rescuing himself in the past.

The Archmage was encouraged to conquer the world, but first had to retrieve the trio of occult objects he most desired: the ancient book of magic spells named the Grimorum Arcanorum, the Phoenix Gate, and the Eye of Odin; as well as to conquer Avalon as a base of operations. His future self secured an alliance with the Weird Sisters to watch out for the mystical artifacts, as well as guide the destinies of Demona and Macbeth, advising them to bend Oberon's law of non-interference.

The "Future Archmage" brought his past self nearly a thousand years into the future, where his past self swallowed the Grimorum to bring it onto the island, thus making him very powerful. However, he was defeated by Goliath, who stripped him of the Eye of Odin, causing the Grimorum to turn the Archmage into a pile of dust. During some unspecified time, the enhanced Archmage undertook additional time travel, thus meeting a Timedancing Brooklyn.

==== The Captain of the Guard ====
The Captain of the Guard (voiced by Ed Gilbert) was the head of Castle Wyvern's garrison in 994. Resentful of the lack of appreciation that he and the gargoyles received for defending the castle, he struck a deal with Demona and the Vikings to have the castle sacked, forcing out the humans and leaving only him and the gargoyles. The plan included sabotage, such as severing bowstrings, but backfired when the Viking leader Hakon shattered most of the gargoyles during the day after the siege, prompting Goliath and the survivors (Hudson, Brooklyn, Broadway, Lexington and Bronx) to go after the Vikings for revenge. The Captain was killed along with Hakon in 994 when they fell off a cliff, but their spirits remained trapped in the area as punishment for their actions. When Goliath returned to the Wyvern site a thousand years later, the Captain and Hakon's ghosts attempted to steal Goliath's lifeforce and thus free themselves from the area. He stopped midway after realizing his guilt for his treachery and turned on Hakon. Having atoned for his sins, the Captain's ghost was set free to rest in peace.

His first name, Robert, was revealed in the canonical first issue of Dynamite Entertainment's comic book series, Gargoyles: The Dark Ages.

=== Residents of New York ===
==== Elisa Maza ====
Elisa Maza (voiced by Salli Richardson) is an NYPD detective, a woman of Hopi and Nigerian heritage, friend of the Gargoyles, and later love interest for Goliath.

==== Maza Family ====
Eliza's family also figures prominently in the series:

- Peter Maza (voiced by Michael Horse) is Elisa's father. Peter, a Native American of Hopi descent, is a retired NYPD officer. He never argues with Elisa once she sets her mind on something.
- Diane Maza (voiced by Nichelle Nichols) is Elisa's mother. Diane, an African American of Nigerian descent, is an anthropologist and teaches at Columbia University. She goes to a Nigerian village to get in touch with her roots as a griot.
- Derek Maza (voiced by Rocky Carroll) is Elisa's brother. A former NYPD officer who goes to work for Xanatos as a pilot, he is later transformed into the mutate Talon by Xanatos and Sevarius. See above for more information.
- Beth Maza (voiced by Monica Allison in "The Cage," Roxanne Beckford in "Cloud Fathers") is Elisa's sister. A student at the fictional University of Flagstaff, she studies anthropology, focusing on Native American cultures.

==== Macbeth ====
Macbeth (voiced by John Rhys-Davies), former King of Scotland, was loosely based on the Shakespearean character as well as the real historical figure, depicted with a white chin curtain beard in the 1990s main storyline of the series. He is eternally bound to Demona and is forced to live in conflict with her forever; neither one can die until one simultaneously kills the other. Initially an enemy of the gargoyles, he later becomes their ally. He tried to claim the sword Excalibur for himself but did not succeed in doing this. After being impressed with Macbeth's skills and honorable behavior King Arthur offered him a place in the New Round Table. Macbeth, while honored, refused this offer because he felt he could not submit to Arthur's rule as he had "been a king too long." But, Macbeth offered his services should there ever be a crisis. He sometimes uses the alias Lennox Macduff (after two characters in the Shakespeare play).

===== Macbeth's family =====
- Duncan (voiced by Neil Dickson) is the ancient king of Scotland, Macbeth's foe, and the second to wear the Hunter mask. He secretly ordered the death of Macbeth's father, and destroyed the few remaining gargoyles in Scotland. It was because of Duncan that the Weird Sisters forged the spell between Macbeth and Demona. While in a sword fight with Macbeth, Macbeth uses an orb given to him by the Weird Sisters to burn Duncan alive.
- Gillecomgain (voiced by Cam Clarke as a young man, Jim Cummings as an adult) started the Hunter line as part of his revenge on Demona, who had scarred his face as a child. As an assassin under Duncan, he started a spree of terror and violence that included assassinating Macbeth's father Findláech of Moray and nearly wiping out all of the gargoyles in Scotland. After betraying Duncan, Duncan reveals him as the murderer of Findláech to Macbeth, who promptly attacks him alongside Demona. During the fight, Demona throws him off a balcony to his death.
- Gruoch (voiced by Emma Samms) is Macbeth's beloved in ancient Scotland, Gruoch is pressured into marriage to Gillecomgain by her father Boite. When Gillecomgain is revealed as the Hunter and slain, she happily marries her love and becomes Lady Macbeth, Queen of Scotland. They are later severed when Macbeth "dies" and begins his centuries-long struggle with Demona.
- Lulach (voiced by Jeff Bennett) is the son of Gruoch and (historically) stepson of Macbeth (though this is not made explicit on the series). Ascends to the throne of Scotland after his father's "death." His ultimate fate is not shown, but it is implied that he is slain by Duncan's son, Canmore, in a later battle.
- Boite (voiced by Ed Gilbert) is the father of Gruoch and friend to Macbeth's father Findláech, Boite serves as an advisor to his son-in-law, Macbeth, throughout his life. Boite counseled Macbeth to destroy the remaining gargoyles (a plan which Macbeth rejected), ultimately leading to Demona and Macbeth's falling-out.
- Canmore (voiced by Neil Dickson) – Son of Duncan, Canmore is only a boy when his father is slain in battle by Macbeth. Canmore is banished to England, but returns to Scotland as a grown man for revenge. Like his father before him, Canmore takes up the mask of the Hunter and declares war upon the gargoyles. He "slays" Macbeth in single combat, unaware of Macbeth's immortality. It is implied that he later has Macbeth's son, Lulach, killed. Canmore's descendants each become the Hunter in turn, hunting Demona through the centuries.

==== The Pack ====
The Pack are a group of mercenaries organized by Xanatos first to be TV stars, then to hunt gargoyles. Lexington harbors a bitter hatred against them.

They were subsequently "upgraded" into more deadly forms through the use of genetic and cybernetic enhancements. Each of its members are named after different canines and one feliformia.

- Coyote (voiced by Jonathan Frakes) is a robot constructed by the Scarab Corporation in Xanatos' image.
- Wolf (voiced by Clancy Brown) is a descendant of Hakon and member of the Pack. Upon the Pack getting "upgraded", Wolf was genetically mutated into a werewolf-like creature.
- Jackal (voiced by Matt Frewer) is a cold and calculating member of the Pack. He was later "upgraded" and gained cybernetic enhancements.
- Hyena (voiced by Cree Summer) is the most bloodthirsty member of the Pack and the younger sister of Jackal. She was later "upgraded" and gained cybernetic enhancements.
- Dingo (voiced by Jim Cummings) is a fit member of the Pack who wields a variety of weaponry. He later utilizes a robotic battle suit due to refusing to undergo the cybernetic or genetic enhancements that the other Pack members did. Over time, Dingo misses the adulation he received as a fictional hero while on television. To both atone for his own past misdeeds and to actually be a real-world hero, Dingo joins Robyn Canmore's Redemption Squad after allowing the cybernetic being Matrix to join with him.

==== Fox ====
Born with the name Janine Renard, Fox (voiced by Laura San Giacomo) had her name legally changed. Her birth surname, "Renard", is the French word for "fox". She is the daughter of entrepreneur and business magnate Halcyon Renard and his ex-wife Anastasia Renard (the name used by Titania, "Queen of the Third Race", while in the guise of a mortal human woman).

A former mercenary and former leader of the Pack, Fox quit the group upon gaining parole and married David Xanatos. They later had a son Alexander Fox Xanatos.

Like many villains of the series, Fox initially had no love for the Gargoyles, seeing them as pawns to be manipulated. After they saved Alex, she changed her opinion and went out of her way to make amends—particularly to Lexington, whom she had once hurt. For his part, Lexington agrees to a truce for her son's sake.

==== Dracon crime family ====
The Dracon crime family is one of the six crime families in the New York underworld.

===== Dominic Dracon =====
Dominic Dracon (voiced by Darren McGavin) is the crime boss of the Dracon crime family and former partner of Mace Malone. He would later pass this role to Tony Dracon and use the alias of J.F. Benton.

===== Tony Dracon =====
Tony Dracon (voiced by Richard Grieco) is the crime boss of the Dracon crime family in New York and the grandson of Dominic Dracon. Dracon knows about the Manhattan Clan that often foil his plans, and has a score to settle with Elisa. He often clashes with Goliath and Broadway. In his last appearance, he was imprisoned with Czech gangster Brod, his hated rival.

===== Glasses =====
Glasses (voiced by Rocky Carroll) is the consigliere of the Dracon crime family who gets his name from his namesake.

===== Pal Joey =====
Pal Joey (voiced by Michael Bell) is a minion of Tony Dracon.

==== Margot Yale and Brendan Quarters ====
Margot Yale (voiced by Marina Sirtis in most appearances, Brigitte Bako in "Monsters", Tress MacNeille in Gargoyles: The Goliath Chronicles) and Brendan Quarters (voiced by Pat Fraley) are a yuppie couple who have the misfortune of running into the gargoyles often. Yale became the assistant district attorney of one of the New York City boroughs, and spoke out against the gargoyles in a heated televised public debate with Macbeth, who defended them. Yale angered him enough to wish Yale could still to be burnt at the stake, subtly calling her a witch. During the Halloween party at the top of the Eyrie Building, she berated Quarters for dressing as a Gargoyle (as other partygoers had done). Quarters later came across Goliath, injured, and sent for a doctor.

==== Jeffrey Robbins ====
Jeffery Robbins (voiced by Paul Winfield) is a blind author, a Vietnam War veteran, and a friend of Hudson. He helps Hudson find Macbeth. Afterward, he taught Hudson how to read, and decided to write a book based on the Scrolls of Merlin which he called The Sword and the Staff. When Demona unleashes a spell to turn the citizens of Manhattan to stone by broadcasting the spell on all television channels, Hudson and the clan visit Robbins and discover that blind people are immune to the spell.

During the Halloween of 1996, Robbins admitted to being aware that Hudson is a Gargoyle—due to the late night visits, Scottish accent, scents of leather and concrete, and Hudson's refusal to shake his hand. The scene was based on a similar one from a Goliath Chronicles episode.

Robbins helps a blind Hudson recover his eyesight after discovering Hudson is a gargoyle.

==== Vinnie Grigori ====
Vinnie Grigori (voiced by Jeff Bennett) is another man who has had various encounters with the Manhattan clan, whom he blames for an unfortunate string of bad luck. He is seen first as a motorcycle rider whose bike is "stolen" and crashed by Lex; Grigori had his license revoked, as his recollection of Lex would lead the judge to believe he was intoxicated. He is next seen as a security guard for Cyberbiotics' airship—the night Goliath and Demona destroy it. He is at Sevarius's labs when Goliath captures Sevarius to force him to make a cure for the Mutates (for which Grigori was fired). He later shows up carrying a huge bazooka, which he uses to finally get revenge on Goliath—stalking Goliath as he and Hudson battled Wolf and the spirit of Hakon—shooting him in the face... with a banana cream pie.

He appeared as a reluctant recruit of the Quarrymen under pressure from Castaway, where he worked to save Goliath and Elisa from being killed. He then left to take a job in Japan. He eventually leaves on flight 994 and ends up lost in Tokyo. Vinnie's name and voice is a spoof of the character Vinnie Barbarino from the show Welcome Back, Kotter, and even refers to the bazooka he used on Goliath as Mr. Carter. The cream pie that it shoots is a tribute to another Disney show, Bonkers, which Gargoyles creator Greg Weisman worked on.

=== Hakon ===
Hakon (voiced by Clancy Brown) was the leader of the Vikings who ransacked Castle Wyvern in 994 and destroyed most of the gargoyles in their stone sleep. He was killed, along with the Captain of the Guard, when they fell off a cliff, but their spirits remained trapped in the area as punishment for their actions. When Goliath returned to the Wyvern site a thousand years later, the Captain and Hakon's ghosts attempted to steal Goliath's lifeforce to free themselves from the area. Hakon's ghost reappeared throughout the series, trying to take revenge on Goliath.

Before his death, Hakon apparently fathered children who became the ancestors of Pack member Wolf. His spirit later bonded to his axe. After the axe was destroyed by Hudson, Hakon's spirit dissolved.

=== Finella ===
Finella (voiced by Sheena Easton) is a Scottish princess from 995. Finella was conned into helping Constantine set a deadly trap for King Kenneth upon Constantine's promise to marry her. Less than pleased at his betrayal and engagement to another, Finella helped Princess Katharine and the Magus get the eggs to Avalon and escape from Constantine, who wanted to marry Princess Katherine to secure his claim to the throne and destroy the eggs. Finella did not follow Katharine and company onto Avalon, instead choosing to guard the Grimorum Arcanorum with help from Tom's mother Mary.

In 997, while Timedancing, Brooklyn arrived to save Finella and Mary from one of Constantine's soldiers. Together, the three of them joined Constantine's enemies, led by King Kenneth III. The book was taken from Finella, during the fight, by Constantine's sorcerer, Brother Valmont. After it was retrieved by Brooklyn, Finella and Mary continued guarding the Grimorum, leaving 997 with Brooklyn.

In October 1996, Finella (or a woman resembling her) attended a Halloween party atop the Eyrie Building.

She is loosely based on a character in Scottish folklore named Lady Finella.

=== Arthur Pendragon ===
Arthur Pendragon (voiced by John St. Ryan) was once the legendary and Future King of Britain. Pendragon was based on the legend of King Arthur. He was awakened by Elisa to help fight the Archmage in Avalon. Though he had neither Merlin nor his knights nor the famed sword Excalibur, he fought Macbeth and won. He then decided to explore the modern world on his own, so as not draw attention to himself. Arriving in England, Arthur was joined by the English gargoyle Griff, and battled Macbeth (with the help of the Manhattan Clan) to reclaim Excalibur. After defeating Macbeth and reclaiming Excalibur, he set off along with Griff on a journey to find Merlin.

=== The Hunters/Quarrymen ===
Descendants of King Duncan I, the Hunters are fighters from a series of hereditary villains through time that have sworn under the Hunter Mask to hunt down Demona and destroy all gargoyles. The current generation (consisting of Jason, Jon, and Robyn) come to New York after hearing of gargoyle encounters. However, Jason and Robyn Canmore eventually come to realize that not all gargoyles are the threat to humanity that Demona is, and drop the Hunter cause. Their brother Jon, initially apprehensive, develops a deep hatred for the gargoyles, drops the Hunter persona, and changes his name to John Castaway. As Castaway, he leads an anti-gargoyle group reminiscent of the Ku Klux Klan called the Quarrymen.

Jason was recovering in the hospital while Robyn was recruited into the Redemption Squad as the group's leader.

The three modern Hunters are:

==== Jason Canmore ====
Jason Canmore (voiced by Diedrich Bader) is a Hunter who sought to avenge his father. He was accidentally paralyzed by Jon causing him to go through physical therapy at Manhattan General.

==== Jon Canmore ====
Jon Canmore (voiced by Scott Cleverdon as an adult, J. D. Daniels as a young boy in "Hunter's Moon") is the brother of Jason Canmore. Later took up the alias of "John Castaway."

==== Robyn Canmore ====
Robyn Canmore (voiced by Sheena Easton) is the sister of Jason and Jon Canmore. While aiding her siblings in ridding Manhattan of gargoyles, Robyn Canmore took up the alias Robyn Correy and was employed by Demona/Dominique Destine for Nightstone Unlimited. She deduced Demona's human identity, and shot The Clocktower hoping to kill Goliath and Clan. Though she saw the light after Jason's atonement, Robyn was maintaining her identity as The Hunter while serving The Director. The nature of her recruitment has yet to be revealed.

==== Banquo and Fleance ====
Banquo (voiced by Frank Welker) and Fleance (voiced by B.J. Ward) are two mercenaries who worked for Macbeth. They helped him retrieve the first Scrolls of Merlin and the sword Excalibur. They later left his service to work for the Quarrymen. Their first mission as Quarrymen had them, and Castaway, pursuing Goliath and Elisa to the destroyed Clocktower. Banquo and Fleance are named after the characters Banquo and Fleance in Shakespeare's play The Tragedy of Macbeth.

=== Minor human characters ===
- Cuchulainn (voiced by Scott Cleverdon) – The legendary demi-god hero of Ireland, Cuchulainn is encountered by Goliath and his allies reincarnated as an Irish teenager named Rory Dugan. He reverts to his heroic form when Rory's own girlfriend Molly reveals herself to be his old enemy, the Banshee, in disguise, especially when she further transforms herself into the gigantic, centipede-like "death worm" Cromm-Cruach. For a time, Cuchulainn mistakes Bronx for the legendary Hound of Ulster.
- Nick (voiced by Gregg Rainwater) – A Native American youth of the Pacific Northwest, Nick (born Natsilane, presumably named for or descended from the legendary hero) initially rejects his heritage for the realities of the modern world. He later encounters Goliath, Angela, and Bronx, and comes to accept the existence of the supernatural. He takes up the cause of his tribe and does battle with the trickster spirit Raven.
- Petros Xanatos (voiced by W. Morgan Sheppard) - The quasi-estranged father of David Xanatos who works as a fisherman.
- Max Loew (voiced by Scott Weil) – A direct descendant of Rabbi Loew, Max reanimates the powerful Golem to protect the people of Prague. When the Golem is insincerely hijacked by Halcyon Renard as a replacement for his frail body, Max enlists the help of Goliath, Angela, and Elisa to recover it. Though it is never explicitly stated in the episode, Max and the people the Golem was created to protect are implicitly Jewish. It is not stated whether Max is a citizen of the Czech Republic or an American visiting Prague.
- The Emir (voiced by Tony Shalhoub) – Mentioned by name in two episodes, but not seen in person until the episode Grief, the Emir was an Egyptian dignitary hired by Xanatos to capture Anubis, in yet another attempt to obtain immortality. However, the Emir planned on using Anubis to resurrect his dead son, who he felt was unfairly taken away from him in a "pointless car accident". Jackal hijacked the ceremony, but the Emir was able to usurp Anubis's power back. As the avatar of death, the Emir finally realized the role death plays in the world and that it cannot be meddled with, as much as humans want to. He reversed everything Jackal had done as the avatar (except for a village out in Jackal's rampage), and sacrificed himself to free Anubis.
- Travis Marshall (voiced by Charles Hallahan) – A television anchor reporter at WVRN who also hosts the TV program Nightwatch.
- Maria Chavez (voiced by Rachel Ticotin) – Maria Chavez was the Captain of NYPD's 23rd precinct and Elisa Maza's superior.
- Tomas Brod (voiced by Clancy Brown) – A Czech gangster whom Preston Vogel hires to steal the Golem for Renard. After causing Goliath and Elisa problems in Prague, he moves to New York to take on Tony Dracon where the Brod crime family become one of the six crime families in the New York underworld. Both of them were later arrested and imprisoned in the same cell.
- Taro (voiced by James Saito) – A Japanese businessman who threatened to expose the Ishimura Clan to the world through a "gargoyle theme park" he had constructed for the task on the outskirts of Ishimura; this "theme park" also functioned as a prison-like facility for any gargates within it for the purposes of public display, which ran against the Ishimura Clan's wishes (their Clan already had a long-established, strongly positive relationship with Ishimura's human population). As a result, Yama took on Taro and defeated him in one-on-one combat.
- Shaman (voiced by James Avery) – An Aborigine wise man, who became Dingo's spiritual advisor when the latter decided to wipe the slate clean regarding his past. He was aware of Dingo's armor, and of the existence of Gargoyles. The Shaman also helped Dingo and Goliath reach the Dreamtime to communicate and reason with Matrix. He also suggested that both Dingo and Matrix should join the Redemption Squad.

== The Third Race/Oberon's Children ==
The Third Race, also known as Oberon's Children, were magical, shapeshifting, and often fickle creatures and fairies from around the world. They were not all literally descended from Oberon, but he was their leader and he governed all of the Third Race under a strictly-enforced set of rules. They possessed incredible powers, were apparently immortal, but had a fatal weakness to any form of iron in proximity to them. Regardless, as long as they were in the real world, Oberon forbade them from interfering in human events. However, many of the Third Race (particularly the Weird Sisters), as well as humans and gargoyles, have realized that Oberon's laws can be bent even if they cannot be broken.

It is also revealed that members of the Third Race can mate with humans to form hybrids of both with Fox, her son Alexander, and Merlin being examples of these "halflings".

=== Oberon ===
Oberon (voiced by Terrence Mann) was the lord of Avalon. He possessed god-like powers and was the most powerful being in the whole series. Very arrogant and impudent, it was by his edict that Avalon was abandoned and the Third Race forced to live with humanity, partially due to Titania's habit of interfering directly in mortal affairs. Oberon later himself left Avalon to join them. He was also responsible for The Gathering in which the Third Race left the rest of the world and congregated in Avalon.

=== Titania ===
Titania (voiced by Kate Mulgrew) was Oberon's (recently remarried) wife and Queen of Avalon. Posing as the human Anastasia during part of her 1,000-year exile, she was the ex-wife of Halcyon Renard and Fox's biological mother. A highly skilled manipulator, she aided the Manhattan and Avalon Clans on several occasions, frequently keeping Oberon in check and teaching him some humility.

=== The Weird Sisters ===
The Weird Sisters – Phoebe, Selene, and Luna (all voiced by Kath Soucie) – were a Triple Goddess of powerful magic users named after three Greco-Roman goddesses of the Moon and based on the witches from Shakespeare's Macbeth. The sisters appeared sporadically throughout early episodes in various guises, but eventually revealed their hand in looking after Demona and Macbeth, being the ones who linked their fates and made them immortal. Their overarching motivation, however, is to aid the Archmage in gaining revenge upon Katherine, Tom, and the Magus, who had outwitted them and gained entry to Avalon in spite of Oberon's ban. Following the Archmage's defeat, the Weird Sisters returned to Oberon and, possibly in a last-ditch attempt to get back at the gargoyles, informed him of the Avalon Clan's continued presence. At this point, they appeared to stop meddling and remained in Oberon's service. They were last seen forcibly bringing the Banshee before Oberon at the Gathering.

The blond-haired sister is named Phoebe, who embodies grace. The black-haired sister is named Selene, who embodies vengeance. And the silver-haired one is named Luna, and who embodies fate; all three are named for mythological moon goddesses.

=== Puck ===
Puck (voiced by Brent Spiner) was a trickster fairy. His magic was the reason why Demona became human during the day, instead of turning to stone. It was eventually discovered that he was the true form of Owen Burnett, having made a deal with Xanatos to serve him faithfully. Because of this deal and his affinity for humans, he was banished from Avalon and had the use of his powers "hard-limited" by Oberon. Since The Gathering, Puck could only use his powers within Oberon's strictly imposed limits: meaning they were only usable when Puck was teaching or protecting his employer's son Alexander Xanatos.

In the third season, Oberon's decree was shown to have a drawback as Owen was rendered unconscious when Alexander was kidnapped by the Quarrymen, leaving Puck unable to save the boy.

=== Minor children of Oberon ===
The rest of the Children of Oberon were fairies, gods, and other various creatures from cultures and mythologies worldwide that lived in Avalon until they were all expelled by Oberon. They were forcibly called back to Avalon by him one thousand years later in an event known as The Gathering.

- Anansi (voiced by LeVar Burton) – A spider trickster of African myth. He can literally spin spells using his web, which is also his weakness. If his web is taken apart, Anansi is powerless. His magic can change the shape of living creatures.
- Anubis (voiced by Tony Jay) – The ancient Egyptian Jackal Lord and avatar of death. Those who became his avatar and used his powers could reduce or advance the ages of others, but few were worthy enough to wield it.
- Banshee (voiced by Sheena Easton) – An Irish fairy with a powerful wailing scream, and the modern archenemy of Cu Chulainn. Goliath, Eliza, and Angela encountered her on their adventure to Ireland. She objected to The Gathering and was forcibly brought to Avalon by the Weird Sisters before being attacked by Odin for her insolence. Oberon silences Banshee by sealing her mouth.
- Coyote (voiced by Gregg Rainwater) – A Native American trickster spirit. He primarily appeared as the younger self of Elisa's father, though he can also take the form of a whirlwind. Xanatos captured him with Coyote 4.0 in an attempt to force Coyote to grant him and Fox (and by extension, their then-unborn son Alex) immortality.
- Grandmother (voiced by Amentha Dymally) – An elderly wise woman of great power. Raven has said they are cousins. After Raven is defeated (again, ritually), Grandmother revitalizes the island with magical water formed from her hair.
- Lady of the Lake – The patron of King Arthur and keeper of Excalibur during his time of absence. Although several Ladies appear in Arthurian myth, it is unclear which, if any, the Gargoyles character is intended to be.
- Nought – A caped clad figure who is one of the Children of Oberon. Not much is known about him.
- Odin (voiced by W. Morgan Sheppard) – The All-Father of Norse mythology. The Eye of Odin, a magical item that featured prominently in the series, is his actual eye as known of in Norse legend, preserved as a jewel-like magical artifact on Avalon in the distant past, and amicably returned to him by Goliath in the "Avalon World Tour" story arc's episode entitled Eye of the Storm. He gets along well with Oberon. During The Gathering, he attacked a defiant Banshee.
  - Sleipnir - Odin's horse. In this show, Sleipnir can change the number of legs that it has.
- Raven (voiced by Lawrence Bayne) – Raven is a trickster spirit who poses as a gargoyle to toy with Goliath and his allies. He usually appears as a raven or normal man with pointed ears in a blue outfit. He and Grandmother are cousins.

Also present at The Gathering are an unnamed Centaur, two giants, and a winged horse.

== Other characters ==
=== The Lost Race ===
The Lost Race was a sentient race of Earthlings whose evolution predated the Three Races and has since become extinct, although Greg Weisman has yet to reveal when or how this occurred. In fact, he writes, "it's hard to give a category to something that currently I have no intention of discussing. But 'Lost Race' seems as good a moniker as any—as a place-holder."

What is known is that the Lost Race, the gargoyles, the humans, and finally Oberon's Children appeared on Earth in that order. The Lost Race is in fact from Earth, and Weisman denies their having any contact with extraterrestrials. Although they eventually became extinct, the Lost Race was still around when Oberon's Children first evolved, as they were aware of the Children's existence.

Brooklyn encountered this race on his time-travels to the past during his Timedancer adventures. Weisman confirmed that the Lost Race has left behind relics and artifacts from their civilization. It is speculated by fans that these may include the ruins in the Archmage's Cave, notably the Megalith Dance, although Weisman refuses to confirm or deny the possibility.

=== The Steel Clan ===
The Steel Clan are a series of robots built by Xanatos, modeled from the likeness of the gargoyles—specifically, Goliath. Originally meant to replace the gargoyles, Xanatos used them for his own personal army. He also wore a battle suit modeled in their likeness.

=== The New Olympians ===
The New Olympians were a group of fantastical sentient beings resembling creatures and gods from Greek mythology. They had traveled to the island of New Olympus after being driven there by fearful humans in Classical Antiquity, and their descendants were able to remain hidden through advanced cloaking technology. Several of them shared names with characters from mythology, although they were not intended to be identified with those characters unlike some of the Children of Oberon. According to Gargoyles creator Greg Weisman, they are descended from Oberon's children, though the show makes no mention of this. There is also a resident gargoyle clan on the island.

The New Olympians appeared during the "Avalon World Tour" story arc in the episode "The New Olympians" in which Elisa Maza arrived on the island along with her three "gargoyle" companions (Goliath, his daughter Angela, and Bronx). Because of their experiences with the human race, Taurus at one point specifically mentions his ancestor's imprisonment in the Labyrinth where he was later killed by Theseus. The New Olympians harbored a strong hatred against Elisa and humans in general. This inverts the show's usual premise in which many humans are prejudiced against creatures such as gargoyles. After an encounter with Proteus, Elisa managed to convince some New Olympians—particularly Taurus—that not all humans are evil.

- Boreas (voiced by Dorian Harewood) – A winged man who is the ruler of New Olympus.
- Taurus (voiced by Michael Dorn) – A Minotaur who is the chief of security.
- Talos (voiced by Dorian Harewood) — An upgraded version of the Talos first constructed by Daedalus. He is a high-level advisor who guards the power supply to New Olympus' cloaking field. When Eliza and the gargoyles landed on New Olympus, Talos advised to Boreas that they make peace with humanity as it will not be long before the technology that powers their cloaking field fails.
- Proteus (voiced by Roddy McDowall) – A villainous shapeshifter who seemed to be the island's worst criminal after he killed Taurus' father.
- Helios (voiced by Rob Paulsen) – A fire-haired man who is part of New Olympus' security force.
- Ekidna (voiced by Charity James) – An elderly creature who is half-woman half-snake. The use of the letter "k" in her name's spelling was intended by the show's creators to differentiate Ekidna from her mythological namesakes.
- Kiron (voiced by Frank Welker) – A centaur with brown skin who is part of New Olympus' security force. The use of the letter "k" in his name's spelling was intended by the show's creators to differentiate Kiron from his mythological namesakes.

Other New Olympians seen include an unnamed female centaur, an unnamed Cyclops, and an unnamed fairy.

A spinoff show, itself entitled The New Olympians, was planned; the Gargoyles episode featuring the characters was a "backdoor pilot". A series pitch was produced, revealing that the new series' storyline would have revolved around the New Olympians revealing themselves to humanity in front of the United Nations. The pitch, which is shown at Gathering conventions, introduced several new characters like the electrokinetic Jove and hinted at a Romeo and Juliet-style romance between Sphinx (a New Olympian female) and Terry Chung (a human male). Although the series was never picked up, Greg Weisman has said that elements would have been included in the main Gargoyles series had it continued. Terry Chung appears as a trick or treater in the Gargoyles comic issue number four, which places the beginning of New Olympians at least a decade after the 2006 issues. He appears with during New Year's Eve of 1996 with his cousin Tri Chung.

=== Nokkar ===
Nokkar (voiced by Avery Brooks) was a sentinel and member of the N'Kai (interstellar aliens who oppose the Space-Spawn empire), Nokkar waited on Easter Island to protect the Earth. While there, he was revered as a god by the natives, and the Easter Island Statues were modeled after him. He once captured Goliath and Angela, believing them to be Space-Spawn in disguise. Until the quartet of the "Avalon World Tour" visit Easter Island, Nokkar does not yet know of the Earth's gargoyle population and is resultingly confused, thinking that they are with the aliens he is guarding against. In addition, Nokkar has never had any contact with any of the residents of Avalon, the children of Oberon, or any of the New Olympians.

=== Tasmanian Tiger ===
Tasmanian Tiger was a supervillain appearing in the SLG comics who robbed a bank in Sydney. His actions caught the attention of Dingo and Matrix (both of whom were Australia's crimefighters). Tasmanian Tiger wore a skin tight costume and mask. His gloves had a set of razor sharp claws that were able to damage Matrix.

==== Benjamin and Natasha ====
Benjamin and Natasha are two thylacines who were cloned by Anton Sevarius and owned by Tasmanian Tiger.

== Organizations and groups ==
=== The Illuminati ===
In the Gargoyles universe, the Illuminati were a secret society started by Sir Percival, the Fisher King, that controlled and manipulated a large portion of the world, including politics and organized crime. Xanatos was a member of the Illuminati, which aided him in making his fortune (through a predestination paradox—Xanatos had instructed himself to travel through time). The founding and senior members used rejuvenating drugs so that they can join King Arthur in establishing a new kingdom. Bluestone was inducted into the society after Mace Malone's failed attempt to capture Goliath. Matt's former partner in the FBI, Martin Hacker, was also a member of the Illuminati. Thailog joined as a new member at some unspecified time, and was the first gargoyle known to be part of the Society. The Society was last seen headed by Peredur fab Ragnal.

Each member was of a certain numerical rank. When two members of the society encountered each other in private, they would share their rank.

==== Peredur fab Ragnal ====
Peredur fab Ragnal is introduced in the trade paperback for the comic, as the story introducing him was not published as a single issue. He was the leader of The Illuminati, and, through Quincy Hemmings, ordered Xanatos to steal The Stone of Destiny while it was being returned to Scotland. To his disappointment, there were 3 stones which the Spirit of Destiny inhabited, but from it he learned that Arthur had reawakened. Since Arthur was not supposed to awaken for another 200 years, Peredur decides to hold a meeting of the higher-echelon members, since this development could affect their (unspecified) plans.

While Ragnal does not appear onscreen, Greg Weisman envisioned the voice of the character to be Jude Law.

==== Fleur ====
Fleur, originally known as "Blanchefleur", is introduced in the trade paperback edition of the comic, as the story introducing her was not published as a single issue. She is Peredur's wife and met Xanatos in a warehouse after he apparently stole the Stone of Destiny. She discovered that Arthur Pendragon awakened after eavesdropping on a message that the Stone conveyed to Peredur. Like Duval, Fleur was also important to Peredur, but Fleur has had an occasionally contentious relationship with Duval.

Greg Weisman envisioned actress Rhona Mitra to voice the character for potential animation.

==== Matt Bluestone ====
Matt Bluestone (voiced by Thomas F. Wilson) is a Jewish American and a Detective Sergeant in the NYPD. He was a former FBI agent who was assigned to be Elisa's partner after the shooting incident. The NYPD 23rd Precinct's Captain, Maria Chavez, thought it was too dangerous for Elisa to be working on her own after she was shot, and assigned Bluestone as her new partner so that she would have someone covering her back—despite Elisa's adamant protests that she did not need a partner. Bluestone is a big believer in conspiracy theories, especially the Illuminati. He was one of the few humans who were friends with the Manhattan Clan. The Illuminati were impressed enough with Matt persistence that they made him a member; ironically, this works in his favor in trying to expose them.

==== Martin Hacker ====
Martin Hacker (voiced by Michael Bell) was Matt Bluestone's former partner in the FBI and an Illuminati operative, Hacker's job was to intentionally mislead Matt away from the Illuminati. When this failed, it was Martin who conferred membership onto Matt on the behalf of the Illuminati.

After Manhattan discovers the existence of gargoyles, Hacker checks in on Matt Bluestone and John Castaway, as well as giving Xanatos an invitation to the White House from the Illuminati. While meeting all three of them, he claims a different objective from The Illuminati. With Matt Bluestone, he claims that the Illuminati agree that people are not ready to encounter gargoyles. With Xanatos, he says the Illuminati feel it is time for humans and gargoyles to meet. As for John Castaway, he claimed that the Illuminati agree that the gargoyles should be destroyed.

==== Norman Ambassador ====
The unnamed Norman Ambassador (voiced by Jeff Bennett) escorted Princess Elena to Castle Wyvern in 975. Both were attacked by the Archmage's bandits and rescued by Xanatos (who followed Demona into the past). Out of gratitude, and due to being a fellow Illuminatus, he allowed Xanatos and his family to join them at Wyvern. He also took a couple of envelopes with him at Xanatos' request—one containing a rare coin to give to a younger David Xanatos in 1975; the other containing details on how the coin was obtained, thus inspiring himself to travel back in time.

==== Mace Malone ====
Mason E. "Mace" Malone (voiced by Efrem Zimbalist Jr.) was a leading crime boss in the 1920s and former partner of Dominic Dracon who was recruited into the Illuminati because of his underworld dealings. In 1924, the crime syndicates became aware of their vulnerability to the Illuminati, resulting in Mace having to disappear. He had a long life due to rejuvenation drugs. His habit of visiting Flo Dane alerted Matt Bluestone to his presence, who saw a photo with Mace wearing a society emblem and received confirmation of his suspicions from Mace's stepson Jack. As a result, Matt was offered membership if he brought a gargoyle to the abandoned Hotel Cabal, an Illuminati base. Though Matt brought Goliath, he secretly filled Goliath in on Mace's plan and left a hotel key for Goliath to escape. Mace, however, lost his key down an elevator shaft in the confusion and became trapped in the hotel.

==== Mr. Duval ====
Mr. Duval is first mentioned in the Gargoyle: The Goliath Chronicles episode "The Journey" (adapted into the first two issues of the SLG comic series). Duval tried to call Xanatos, but Xanatos shows no interest in receiving the call. Hacker tells Xanatos that the call was an invitation to the White House for an Illuminati assignment.

For unspecified reasons, Duval's left eye and arm are replaced with cybernetic attachments, and he has an unexplained disdain for Blanchefleur. He is also very important to Peredur.

While Duval does not appear onscreen, Greg Weisman envisioned the voice of the character to be Eddie Marsan.

==== Shari ====
Shari is a teenage girl introduced in the Gargoyles comics series. She appeared as a new resident of The Labyrinth, and was introduced to the Mutates and Clones. After Thailog came to reclaim the clones, Shari left to warn Goliath, but was lying. Her name was revealed as she arrived at Nightstone Unlimited, applying to be Thailog's executive assistant. Before Thailog attacked her, however, he spotted an Illuminati pendant around her neck and welcomed her as a member of the Illuminati—which he had recently joined as a lower-echelon member.

Thailog soon demanded a story from Shari, and so she told him of a lost tale from The Avalon World Tour. How she learned of that adventure was not specified.

Shari went on to relate the legend of the Stone of Destiny to Thailog. She appeared to be more than she seemed.

==== Quincy Hemings ====
Quincy Hemings made his first appearance in the SLG comic. He is a Chief Steward at the White House. Xanatos meets him at the White House, and mistakes him for Duval due to their shared rank number. Hemings mentioned being on staff since the administration of Theodore Roosevelt, and being in his current position since the Lyndon B. Johnson administration. He gave Xanatos an assignment from The Illuminati. The assignment required Xanatos to retrieve the Stone Of Destiny.

While Hemings does not appear onscreen, Greg Weisman envisioned the voice of the character to be Morgan Freeman.

==== Falstaff ====
Falstaff (went by the name John Oldcastle) was a father figure to Dingo, but for reasons unknown, strangled Dingo's mother. Upon the arrival of the Redemption Squad at his island base (which is really a ship), Falstaff insisted that The Illuminati are the good guys, determined to save the world, and allowed the Redemption Squad to speak to Fiona Canmore and Thailog, so they can vouch for the Illuminati. The Redemption Squad claimed to want membership, but Falstaff was aware of their bluff and sent his associates to fight the Squad. After the fight, he departed, but not before sinking the ship.

===== Falstaff's associates =====
The following are the associates of Falstaff.

- Bardolf – A fire breather.
- Pistol – A gunfighter.
- Points – A swordsman.
- Mistress Doll – A contortionist.
- Mistress Quickly – She is the only one apprehended by the Redemption Squad.

==== Fiona Canmore ====
Fiona Canmore is a former Hunter who ran into Demona in Paris in 1920. She stopped her plans to kill all the humans with the aid of Team Atlantis. As of 1996, she was retired from the hunt and was part of the Illuminati.

In the Team Atlantis episode (which, while unproduced, was scripted and voice-recorded), she was to be voiced by Sheena Easton.

==== Known members and ranking ====
The following characters are part of the Illuminati at the following ranks:

Rank	Character
1	Peredur
2	Mr. Duval; Quincy Hemings
3	Blanchefleur
9	Shari
32	Martin Hacker
36	David Xanatos; Matt Bluestone; John Castaway; Thailog
Unknown	Norman Ambassador; Mace Malone (was somewhere in the high 20s before he died); Falstaff; Fiona Canmore

=== Xanatos Enterprises ===
Xanatos Enterprises was one of the world's largest corporation owned by David Xanatos; Owen Burnett also wielded major control and influence, although he was not given a title. The company was seemingly at the forefront of advanced technology such as genetics, robotics, and weaponry. Xanatos Enterprises also included Gen-U-Tech, Pack Media Studios, and the Scarab Robotics corporation, all of which Xanatos used against the gargoyles and to further his goals one way or another.

==== David Xanatos ====
David Xanatos (voiced by Jonathan Frakes) is a billionaire and CEO of Xanatos Enterprises, the son of Petros Xanatos, and nemesis and later ally of the Manhattan Clan. Xanatos' name is reminiscent of David—the Biblical king who defeated Goliath—and Thanatos from Greek mythology. He broke the spell that imprisoned the gargoyles by having the castle placed on his building and frequently attempted to manipulate or control them. In the final season, when the existence of the gargoyles was revealed to the public, Xanatos puts an end to the feud between them and voluntarily allows the gargoyles to come back to live in their ancestral castle. He was voiced by and inspired by Jonathan Frakes, specifically his character of William Riker in Star Trek: The Next Generation. During the show's development, Xanatos was originally known as Xavier and he was the descendant of the wizard that originally cursed the gargoyles to sleep for a thousand years. According to Greg Weisman, he was, "rich, powerful and petulant. Very Captain Hook." Xanatos' plans often include numerous outcomes meant to serve as a success when one outcome seems to have failed. This popular and ancient trope for villainous characters involving multiple goals to substitute for success when one part of the plan fails has been named Xanatos Gambit. As "David Xanatos still stands as one of the greatest fictional characters to exemplify the trope, and thus it bears the distinction of his name." In addition, Xanatos is noteworthy for making a point of usually never taking setbacks personally, and regards seeking revenge as foolish.

==== Owen Burnett ====
Owen Burnett (voiced by Jeff Bennett) was Xanatos' personal assistant who is later revealed to be a form of the immortal trickster Puck. Puck took on an appearance similar to that of Preston Vogel, Halcyon Renard's personal aid as his decision to "out-Vogel Vogel". When Xanatos deduced his identity, Puck offered him the choice of receiving either the immortality he craved or a lifetime of Puck's service as Owen. To Puck's surprise, Xanatos chose the latter, confident that he would obtain immortality through other means and thus have Owen's services for eternity. For his part, Puck kept to the bargain in part for the novelty of assisting such an unorthodox mortal trickster; as he explained, ""The Puck has played many roles, but never that of straight man." In "The Price", Owen had his left hand turned to stone due to the Cauldron of Life.

==== Anton Sevarius ====
Anton Sevarius (voiced by Tim Curry) was a free agent geneticist who mostly worked for the villains of the series from David Xanatos to Demona. Known for his hammy play on the "mad scientist" stereotype, Sevarius was brilliant, but also devious and immoral. His experiments led to the creation of the Mutates and Goliath's evil clone Thailog (whom he also worked for at one point) as well as the clones of the Manhattan clan.

In the SLG comics, Sevarius cloned two thylacines which were gifted to Tasmanian Tiger.

=== Cyberbiotics Corporation ===
Cyberbiotics Corporation was a rival in all ways to Xanatos Enterprises, led by Halcyon Renard and Preston Vogel. Xanatos attempted several times to bankrupt Cyberbiotics, even using Renard's estranged daughter Fox to do so. Cyberbiotics was based both from a skyscraper on a fictional island in New York Harbor known as the "Cyberbiotics Tower", and from either of two successive, massive, somewhat helicarrier-like airships named the "Fortress", sometimes accompanied by or supplanted with (for smaller missions) any one of a number of smaller "hoverships". The first of these massive "Fortress" airships was inadvertently destroyed by the Manhattan Clan.

==== Halcyon Renard ====
Halcyon Renard (voiced by Robert Culp) was an elderly businessman who is the CEO of Cyberbiotics, father of Fox, ex-husband to Anastasia, and rival and later father-in-law to David Xanatos. He uses a powered reclining version of a wheelchair for unknown reasons; the chair is weaponized for his self-defense needs, along with other devices. After confronting Goliath about his role in destroying his first airship, he formed a friendship with the Manhattan Clan's leader after the pair worked together to save the second airship. It is suggested in "The Cage", that Halcyon lent a lab to Goliath so Dr. Sevarius could create a cure for the Labyrinth Clan. Halcyon's family name, Renard, is the French word for fox. Like Xanatos, he briefly flirted with immortality — with Renard's method being different, as he intended to transfer his own consciousness into a Golem, the legendary protector of the Ashkenazim living in Prague during Renaissance times, and still in existence in the late 20th century within the Gargoyles storyline. This form of what turned out to be a selfishly-acquired form of "immortality" did not go well for Renard, until Goliath managed to change Halcyon's mind for the better, convincing him to leave the Golem's lithic body behind. Unlike Xanatos, Halcyon was more conscientious of his actions, adhering strongly to his own well-developed ideals of personal integrity and near-complete sincerity for both himself, his firm's employees and others he had contact with. Indeed, one of the things that help the elderly man and the Manhattan Clan's leader bond and become friends is that Renard challenged Goliath to accept responsibility for his part in destroying the first airship. Goliath apparently grew to respect the older man because of his strong adherence to his own morals. It is worth noting that Renard and his assistant, Preston Vogel participated in a desperate attempt to stop Oberon from abducting his grandson, Alexander and taking the child to Avalon. When Vogel gently challenged his employer as to his reasons; noting that Renard hated his son-in-law and did not trust his own daughter due to her lack of morals; Renard answered frankly, that he was doing it for his grandson and no one else. He was far less Machiavellian and malevolent than Xanatos.

==== Preston Vogel ====
Preston Vogel (voiced by Peter Scolari) was Renard's assistant who was considered by Puck to be the most "wooden man on the earth." Puck modeled his mortal form after Vogel. Unlike Owen Burnett, Vogel was not as loyal to his boss and had fewer scruples when it came to the means he used to get things done such as hiring members of The Pack, Jackal, and Hyena; levelling a rainforest and killing a sizable number of the Guatemala Clan's gargoyles in 1993; or betraying Renard.

=== Gargoyles Task Force ===
The Gargoyles Task Force is a division of the New York City Police Department's 23rd Precinct was formed during Part 3 of Hunter's Moon to find and counter or capture the gargoyles. They followed the gargoyles to St. Damien's Cathedral. Due to Matt's surreptitious stalling in hopes the clan could escape, they were unable to apprehend the clan. Issue three of the comic introduced the Task Force.

==== Officer Morgan Morgan ====
Morgan Morgan (voiced by Keith David) was a New York Police Department beat officer in Elisa's precinct, and Elisa's friend. During Halloween of 1996, he asked Elisa out to the Halloween party atop The Eyrie Building. Though she refused at first, she accepted after temporarily breaking up with Goliath (due to wanting a normal life). She ended up choosing Goliath, however. Morgan, knowing of her relationship with Goliath, suspected he was merely a rebound, but held no ill feelings towards Elisa.

==== Officer Phil Travanti ====
Phil Travanti (voiced by Jeff Bennett) was Morgan's partner first appeared in the episode Temptation, and was named in issue three of the comic.

==== Other members ====
Besides Eliza Maza, Phil Travanti, Martin Hacker, Matt Bluestone, and Margot Yale, the rest of the Gargoyles Task Force consist of:

- Detective Cedric Harris – Introduced in issue three.
- Detective Tri Chung – Introduced in issue three; first cousin of Terry Chung.

=== The Redemption Squad ===
The Redemption Squad was formed by a man known as The Director to deal with crime and make up for their past sins. The group's first mission was to stop The Illuminati Society. Aside from apprehending Mistress Quickly, their mission was a failure. Besides Robyn Canmore, Dingo, Fang, and Yama, the following member include:

==== The Director ====
The Director (voiced by William Devane in the animatic reel for the spinoff) is the founder of the Redemption Squad.

==== The Matrix ====
The Matrix (voiced by Jim Cummings) was a nanomachine program created by Fox and her mother Anastasia Renard as part of a world domination bid by Xanatos. However, the machines became sentient and threatened to overrun the planet. With the help of a local shaman, Goliath and Dingo convinced the nanomachines to form a humanoid shape that merged with Dingo's armor suit. Calling itself "The Matrix", the merged entity pledged to protect and defend Australia. He was coerced into joining the Squad as an alternative to deactivation; he chose to join as doing so would help to maintain law and order.
