= Gargoyles (comics) =

Comic book series

- Cover of Gargoyles #1 by Greg Guler

Publication information
- Publisher: Slave Labor Graphics, Dynamite Entertainment
- Schedule: Bi-monthly (Slave Labor Graphics), monthly (Dynamite Entertainment)
- Genre: Superhero
- Publication date: 2006 – 2009, 2022 – present
- No. of issues: 38 (as of April 2024)
- Main character: Manhattan Clan

Creative team
- Created by: Greg Weisman (uncredited) and others
- Written by: Greg Weisman
- Penciller(s): David Hedgecock; Greg Guler; Nir Paniry; Karine Charlebois; Gordon Purcell; David Hutchison; Ben Dunn
- Colorist(s): Will Terrell; Dustin Evans; Stephanie Lostimolo; Robby Bevard
- Editor: Jennifer de Guzman

Gargoyles is a fictional team of characters appearing in comic book series initially published by Slave Labor Graphics and Creature Comics between 2006 and 2009 and by Dynamite Entertainment since 2022. It was based on the 1994 animated television series Gargoyles, and was written by series co-creator Greg Weisman. The comic continues the storyline of the first two seasons and ignores all but the first episode of the third season, The Goliath Chronicles.

== Storyline ==
The comic acted as a continuation of the animated series after episode 65, picking up after the climactic second season finale, "Hunter's Moon, Part III". The first two issues of the comic translate episode 66 "The Journey", which was the only third season Gargoyles episode Weisman considers to be canonical (as well as the only third season episode Weisman wrote). Issue #3 of the Gargoyles comic then began a completely new storyline, which deliberately ignored the rest of the events of the televised third season.

Weisman has confirmed that the in-universe timeline of the comic starts in 1996, just after the conclusion of the final episode of the series' second season. Issue #10 was the first issue set in 1997.

== Production ==
=== Slave Labor Graphics/CreatureComics run ===
In June 2005, it was announced that a series of Disney-licensed, bi-monthly Gargoyles comic books would be created by Slave Labor Graphics in association with CreatureComics. Gargoyles #1 was released on June 21, 2006 and promptly sold out, ensuring a second printing. After an extended delay, Gargoyles #2 was released on December 13, 2006. Issue #6 contains an error: the artwork on page 12 and 16 was switched, even though the text is correct. Slave Labor has acknowledged this error, and the corrected issue was reprinted on November 14.

Greg Guler, character designer for the original TV series, and Stephanie Lostimolo have produced the cover art for each issue. Story art is primarily being produced by David Hedgecock and colored by Dustin Evans, although issues #4, #5, and #6 were drawn by guest artists. Gargoyles #6 used the unpublished script that Weisman wrote for the Marvel series.

In August 2008, Greg Weisman announced that, due to Disney increasing its licensing fees, Slave Labor Graphics would not be renewing its license of Gargoyles after it ran out on August 31, 2008. The final two issues of Bad Guys and four of Gargoyles were released in the comic trades collecting both series in August 2009. Weisman also stated that SLG President Dan Vado has not given up on the Gargoyles franchise, and hopes to pursue the idea of Gargoyles graphic novels in the future.

=== Dynamite Entertainment run (2022-present) ===
In 2023, Dynamite Entertainment remaster and republished the SLG/CreatureComics run. A new line of comics, subtitled "Here in Manhattan", serves as Season 4 of the show, again written and overseen by Greg Weisman, with issue 1 releasing on December 7, 2022. Following the conclusion of "Here in Manhattan" in December 2023, a sequel arc, subtitled "Quest", debuted on April 14, 2024. A prequel comic Gargoyles Demona focusing on Demona was released on May 21, 2025.

== Spin-offs ==
One of Greg Weisman's planned Gargoyles spin-offs, Bad Guys, appeared as a black-and-white six-issue limited series in 2007/08. The first issue was released on November 28, 2007. The series was written by Weisman and drawn by Karine Charlebois, with cover art by Greg Guler and Stephanie Lostimolo.

Had the comics continued, Gargoyles: Pendragon would have been next in line, followed by Gargoyles: Timedancer. Each of these would have also appeared as a six-issue black-and-white limited series.

On April 19, 2023, Dynamite Entertainment announced a prequel miniseries, titled Gargoyles: Dark Ages, which would follow the Wyvern Clan's alliance with Prince Malcolm. The first issue in the miniseries was released in July 2023.

== Issues ==
Note that Gargoyles issues #9–12 and Bad Guys issues #5–6 were only published in the collections.

=== Gargoyles (Slave Labor Graphics) ===
Title	Issue #	Release date	
"Nightwatch"	1	June 21, 2006	
"Nightwatch"	Pencil artist: David Hedgecock; Color artist: Will Terrell		Cover Artist: Gregory Robert Guler; Cover color artist: Stephanie Lostimolo
"Nightwatch"	As the public learns of the existence of gargoyles in NYC, the Manhattan Clan goes into hiding atop the Eyrie Building while an anti-gargoyle group known as the Quarrymen are formed by John Castaway. Meanwhile the police set up a task force led by Matt Bluestone to deal with the issue. When Goliath visits Elisa to discuss their troubles, the two find themselves on the run from a squad of Quarrymen.		
"The Journey"	2	December 13, 2006	
"The Journey"	Pencil artist: David Hedgecock; Color artist: Will Terrell		Cover artist: Greg Guler; Cover color artist: Stephanie Lostimolo
"The Journey"	Elisa and a wounded Goliath are pursued through Manhattan by the murderous Quarrymen, while a debate about gargoyles between ADA Margot Yale and "Lennox MacDuff" continues on the local news.		
"Invitation Only"	3	March 28, 2007	
"Invitation Only"	Pencil artist: David Hedgecock; Color artist: Dustin Evans		Cover artist: Greg Guler; Cover color artist: Stephanie Lostimolo
"Invitation Only"	Xanatos arranges a Halloween costume party on top of the Eyrie Building, and the gargoyles plan to attend, pretending to be wearing gargoyle "costumes." However, Elisa and Goliath's relationship has taken a sudden turn. Meanwhile, the shadowy Illuminati are making plans of their own concerning the gargoyles.		
"Masque"	4	May 16, 2007	
"Masque"	Pencil artist: Nir Paniry; Color artist: Dustin Evans		Cover artist: Greg Guler; Cover color artist: Stephanie Lostimolo
"Masque"	The gargoyles mingle with humans in the Eyrie building under cover of a costume party. Thailog returns from his supposed death to claim his "property", and Xanatos is absent from his own party, visiting the White House.		
"Bash"	5	July 18, 2007	
"Bash"	Pencil artist: Karine Charlebois; Color artist: Stephanie Lostimolo		Cover artist: Greg Guler; Cover color artist: Stephanie Lostimolo
"Bash"	The confrontation between Thailog, Goliath, and the clones turns violent, and Delilah must choose a side. Meanwhile, Xanatos meets with a mysterious man in Washington D.C.		
"Reunion"	6	October 10, 2007; Reprint: November 14, 2007	
"Reunion"	Pencil Artist: Gordon Purcell; Color artist: Dustin Evans		Cover artist: Greg Guler; Cover color artist: Stephanie Lostimolo
"Reunion"	Thailog is told of a lost tale from the Avalon World Tour by his new executive assistant. The tale involves Goliath and company meeting up with Coldstone in the Himalayas. The issue ends with Xanatos meeting up with a familiar face.		
"The Rock"	7	December 12, 2007	
"The Rock"	Pencil artist: David Hedgecock; Color Artist: Robby Bevard		Cover artist: Greg Guler; Cover color artist: Robby Bevard
"The Rock"	Macbeth is aided by Lexington and Hudson to safeguard the Stone of Destiny while it is being taken from London to Scotland. Meanwhile, Xanatos prepares for his mission from the Illuminati and recruits Coldsteel and Coyote (Now 5.0).		
"Rock & Roll"	8	March 26, 2008	
"Rock & Roll"	Pencil artist: David Hedgecock; Color artist: Robby Bevard		Cover artist: David Hedgecock; Cover color artist: Jorge Molina
"Rock & Roll"	After Macbeth and the gargoyles make their acquaintance with the London Clan, they unite to protect the Stone from Coldsteel.		
"Rock of Ages"	9	See Clan-Building, Volume Two	
"Rock of Ages"	Pencil artist: David Hedgecock; Color artist: Robby Bevard		Cover artist: Greg Guler; Cover color artist: Robby Bevard
"Rock of Ages"	The Gargoyles, now joined by Coldstone and Coldfire, continue their fight to protect the Stone from Coldsteel, while their opponents implement the rest of their scheme. This is David Hedgecock's last issue as artist for the series, due to his inability to stay on schedule.		
"The Gate"	10	See Clan-Building, Volume Two	
"The Gate"	Pencil artist: Greg Guler; Color artist: Robby Bevard		Cover artist: Greg Guler; Cover color artist: Robby Bevard
"The Gate"	The Phoenix Gate returns to Manhattan, breaks into the Phoenix itself and whisks Brooklyn back to 997 Scotland in the first trip of his 40 year Timedance (which may eventually be created into its own spin-off series, called Timedancer). Greg Guler guest pencils.		
"Tyrants"	11	See Clan-Building, Volume Two	
"Tyrants"	Pencil artist: David Hutchison; Color artist: Robby Bevard		Cover artist: David Hutchison; Cover color artist: Robby Bevard
"Phoenix"	12	See Clan-Building, Volume Two	
"Phoenix"	Pencil artist: Ben Dunn; Color artist: Robby Bevard		Cover artist: David Hutchison; Cover color artist: Robby Bevard
"Phoenix"	Brooklyn and Demona's clan join the fight against the usurper King Constantine. Back in 1997, Goliath's brooding about his clan's survival is interrupted by a pair of unexpected and joyous reunions and additions to the family.		

=== Gargoyles: Bad Guys ===
Title	Issue #	Release date	
"Strangers"	1	November 28, 2007	
"Strangers"	Pencil artist: Karine Charlebois; Color artist: N/A		Cover artist: Greg Guler; Cover color artist: Stephanie Lostimolo
"Strangers"	The Redemption Squad (Dingo, Matrix, Fang, Yama, and Robyn Canmore/Hunter) is on its way to a mission when it comes under attack. The tale of how Dingo came to join the group after his first encounter with the Hunter is recounted.		
"The Lost"	2	April 30, 2008	
"The Lost"	Pencil artist: Karine Charlebois; Color artist: N/A		Cover artist: Greg Guler; Cover color artist: Robby Bevard
"The Lost"	The Redemption Squad continues its mission. The rest of the issue details Yama's recruitment and ends with a familiar face visiting Fang in the Labyrinth.		
"Estranged"	3	May 21, 2008	
"Estranged"	Pencil artist: Christopher Jones; Color artist: N/A		Cover artist: Greg Guler; Cover color artist: Robby Bevard
"Louse"	4	August 20, 2008	
"Louse"	Pencil artist: Karine Charlebois; Color artist: N/A		Cover artist: Greg Guler; Cover color artist: Robby Bevard
"Strangled"	5	See Bad Guys: Redemption	
"Strangled"	Pencil artist: Karine Charlebois; Color artist: N/A		Cover artist: Greg Guler; Cover color artist: Robby Bevard
"Losers"	6	See Bad Guys: Redemption	
"Losers"	Pencil artist: Karine Charlebois; Color artist: N/A		Cover artist: Greg Guler; Cover color artist: Robby Bevard

=== Gargoyles (Dynamite) ===
Title	Issue #	Release date	
"A Little Crazy"	1	December 7, 2022	
"A Little Crazy"	Letters: Jeff Eckleberry; Colors and art: George Kambadais		Cover Artist: David Nakayama
"A Little Crazy"	While Dracon and Brod are held at Rikers, warfare erupts between their respective gangs. Maggie prepares to give birth to her and Talon's child, while Thailog and Sevarius make plans to disrupt Maggie and Talon's lives and abduct their child.		
"Idyll or Nightmare"	2	January 25, 2023	
"Idyll or Nightmare"	Letters: Jeff Eckleberry; Colors and art: George Kambadais		Cover Artist: David Nakayama
"Idyll or Nightmare"	Goliath, Angela, Coldfire and Broadway leave to visit the Labyrinth Clan but find the clan knocked out, with Maggie and Mary kidnapped to Sevarius' lab. Talon assumes that Xanatos is behind the kidnapping and both clans fly to his office to confront him. Meanwhile, Dominic Dracon is released from prison, and his daughter Antoinette visits Tony at Rikers to discuss how to stop the war between the Dracon and Brod gangs before their uncle Dino gets involved.		
"Miracle Child"	3	February 8, 2023	
"Miracle Child"	Letters: Jeff Eckleberry; Colors and art: George Kambadais		Cover Artist: David Nakayama
"Miracle Child"	Goliath calms Talon down from killing Xanatos on the basis that Xanatos himself previously experienced a kidnapping of his child. Xanatos joins the clans on a raid of Sevarius' lab. While a fight breaks out between Thailog and the clans, Mary helps Maggie deliver a baby boy, who shows no signs of inheriting his parents' mutant abilities or features. Thailog, disappointed by the news, gives up and allows the Manhattan and Labyrinth clans to leave. Maggie and Talon name the boy Michael Peter Maza, after the names of their respective grandfathers.		
"Tale Old As Time"	4	March 22, 2023	
"Tale Old As Time"	Letters: Jeff Eckleberry; Colors and art: George Kambadais		Cover Artist: David Nakayama
"Tale Old As Time"	Dino Dracon plans to bring down four rival crime families and the NYPD. Two teenagers, Peter and Rosie, are kidnapped by gangsters wearing gargoyle masks. Goliath and Hudson, who are flying by for unrelated reasons, intervene against the gangmembers, but helicopters from the Gargoyle Task Force fly in to capture Goliath while the gangmembers get away with the teenagers.		
"Render Unto Caesar"	5	April 26, 2023	
"Render Unto Caesar"	Letters: Jeff Eckleberry; Colors and art: George Kambadais		Cover Artist: David Nakayama
"Render Unto Caesar"	Goliath is captured by the city's Gargoyle Task Force, and Hudson is convinced by Bluestone to stand down. Goliath is detained at Rikers, but when Brooklyn leads a rescue, Goliath orders him to abort the attempt and leave him at Rikers. Pretrial deliberations ensue between ADA Yale and defense attorney Tobe Crest. Meanwhile, Dino Dracon's gangmembers send competing proofs of life to Peter and Rosie's parents, who are leaders of two of the crime families, resulting in the parents planning to go to war with each other.		
"Underwater"	6	May 31, 2023	
"Underwater"	Letters: Jeff Eckleberry; Colors and art: George Kambadais		Cover Artist: David Nakayama
"Underwater"	Brooklyn feels the strain of leadership as hopes for Goliath’s release from prison grow dimmer by the hour. Can the members of the Manhattan Clan put aside their differences before the crime syndicates of New York combine to crush the entire city?		
"Everywhere"	7	July 5, 2023	
"Everywhere"	Letters: Jeff Eckleberry; Colors and art: George Kambadais		Cover Artist: David Nakayama
"Everywhere"	Demona is back!! Launching a new and exciting storyline, Gargoyles #7 is the perfect jumping-on point for new readers. Goliath is in prison! Dino Dracon is on the rampage! And Demona returns to Manhattan, determined to gather the three new keys to power! Do Brooklyn and the Clan have a prayer of stopping her without Goliath?! Um...probably not.		
"Mayday"	8	August 2, 2023	
"Mayday"	Letters: Jeff Eckleberry; Colors and art: George Kambadais		Cover Artist: David Nakayama
"Mayday"	Goliath's going on trial! But an old enemy would rather Goliath never made it to court! ATTACK ON RIKERS, a.k.a. Cellmates Make Strange Bedfellows!!		
"Your Witness"	9	September 13, 2023	
"Your Witness"	Letters: Jeff Eckleberry; Colors and art: George Kambadais		Cover Artist: David Nakayama
"Your Witness"	THE TRIAL OF GOLIATH BEGINS! With a district attorney intent on proving that Gargoyles should not be considered people, Goliath will rely on influential human friends to speak on his behalf, including the love of his life, NYPD Detective ELISA MAZA...		
"Trick-Or-Treat"	Halloween Special #1	October 18, 2023	
"Trick-Or-Treat"	Letters: Jeff Eckleberry; Colors and art: George Kambadais		Cover Artist: David Nakayama
"Trick-Or-Treat"	It's young Gnash's first Halloween in Manhattan, and you're invited to come along as he heads out to find friends on the one night of the year when Gargoyles can roam the city unbothered! Unfortunately, he's about to run afoul of the masked Quarrymen, who are out to hunt down any Gargoyle foolish enough to brave the streets on All Hallow's Eve. That means Brooklyn, Katana, Lexington, Broadway, Angela, and even Goliath are in real danger! Will they survive this cruel trick, or become a treat for the marauding Quarrymen?		
"New Rules"	10	October 25, 2023	
"New Rules"	Letters: Jeff Eckleberry; Colors and art: George Kambadais		Cover Artist: David Nakayama
"New Rules"	A RACE AGAINST TIME! Brooklyn's attempts to lead the Clan have left him feeling disappointed and estranged from those he is closest to. But when some dangerous news comes in, it's up to Brooklyn, Lexington, and Broadway to save the day. Can they come together in time to make the daring rescue? Or will daybreak stop them in their tracks?		
"Young at Heart"	11	December 19, 2023	
"Young at Heart"	Letters: Jeff Eckleberry; Colors and art: Guilia Giacomino, Giovanna La Pietra, George Kambadais		Cover Artist: David Nakayama
"Young at Heart"	With the Manhattan Clan back together again, Brooklyn and Katana ask Broadway, Lexington, and Angela to stand as their Seconds during the all-important Commitment Ceremony. The Clan has never felt stronger — which is a good thing, because a desperate Dino Dracon is about to make one last play to take over all of New York City!		
"Cold Comfort"	12	March 20, 2024	
"Cold Comfort"	Letters: Jeff Eckleberry; Colors & Art: Guilia Giacomino, Giovanna La Pietra, George Kambadais		Cover Artist: David Nakayama

=== Gargoyles: Quest (Dynamite) ===
Title	Issue #	Release date	
"Questions"	1 of 5	April 17, 2024	
"Questions"	Letters: Jeff Eckleberry; Colors and art: Pasquale Qualano		Cover Artist: Clayton Crain
"Quo Vadis Cum Hoc?"	2 of 5	May 15, 2024	
"Quo Vadis Cum Hoc?"	Letters: Jeff Eckleberry; Colors and art: Pasquale Qualano		Cover Artist: Clayton Crain
"Acquisitions"	3 of 5	July 31, 2024	
"Acquisitions"	Letters: Jeff Eckleberry; Colors and art: Pasquale Qualano		Cover Artist: Clayton Crain
"Unequivocal Success"	4 of 5	October 2, 2024	
"Unequivocal Success"	Letters: Jeff Eckleberry; Colors and art: Pasquale Qualano		Cover Artist: Clayton Crain
"Queen of All She Surveys"	5 of 5	December 4, 2024	
"Queen of All She Surveys"	Letters: Jeff Eckleberry; Colors and art: Pasquale Qualano		Cover Artist: Clayton Crain

=== Gargoyles: Dark Ages (Dynamite) ===
Title	Issue #	Release date	
"The Reach"	1 of 6	July 12, 2023	
"The Reach"	Letters: Jeff Eckleberry; Colors and art: Drew Moss		Cover Artist: Clayton Crain
"The Reach"	Would follow the Castle Wyvern clan and their alliance with Prince Malcolm in Scotland in the year 971.		
"The Draw"	2 of 6	August 9, 2023	
"The Draw"	Letters: Jeff Eckleberry; Colors and art: Drew Moss		Cover Artist: Clayton Crain
"The Oath"	3 of 6	September 20, 2023	
"The Oath"	Letters: Jeff Eckleberry; Colors and art: Drew Moss		Cover Artist: Clayton Crain
"The Promise"	4 of 6	November 1, 2023	
"The Promise"	Letters: Jeff Eckleberry; Colors and art: Drew Moss		Cover Artist: Clayton Crain
"The Dream"	5 of 6	January 3, 2024	
"The Dream"	Letters: Jeff Eckleberry; Colors & Art: Drew Moss		Cover Artist: Clayton Crain
"Alliance"	6 of 6	March 6, 2024	
"Alliance"	Letters: Jeff Eckleberry; Colors & Art: Drew Moss		Cover Artist: Clayton Crain

=== Collections ===
Title	Volume #	Release date
"Clan-Building, Volume One"	1 of 2	January 23, 2008
"Clan-Building, Volume One"	Pages: 168; Price: $19.95	
"Clan-Building, Volume One"	Collects issues #1–6 of the Clan-Building Arc. Introduction by Wendy Pini.	
"Clan-Building, Volume Two"	2 of 2	August 2009
"Clan-Building, Volume Two"	Pages: 168; Price: $19.95	
"Clan-Building, Volume Two"	Collects issues #7–9, including the unpublished #10-12 and completing the Clan-Building Arc.	
"Bad Guys: Redemption"	1 of 1	August 2009
"Bad Guys: Redemption"	Pages: 168; Price: $17.95	
"Bad Guys: Redemption"	Collects issues #1–4, including the unpublished #5-#6 and completing the story.	
"Here in Manhattan, Volume One"	1 of 2	March 27, 2024
"Here in Manhattan, Volume One"	Pages: 160; Price: $19.99	
"Here in Manhattan, Volume One"	Collects issues #1-6 of the Dynamite-published run.	
"Here in Manhattan, Volume Two"	2 of 2	August 2024
"Here in Manhattan, Volume Two"	Pages: 160; Price: $19.99	
"Here in Manhattan, Volume Two"	Collects issues #7-12 of the Dynamite-published run.	
"Dark Ages"	1 of 1	September 2024
"Dark Ages"	Pages: 176; Price: $19.99	
"Dark Ages"	Collects issues #1-6 of the Dynamite-published run.	

== Reception ==
The SLG series was met with positive reviews, with many readers saying they wished the series did not end after only 12 issues.

== Awards ==
Award name	Year	Status
Ursa Major Award – Best Comic Book	2007	Won

== Kickstarter Campaign ==
In 2024 Dynamite Comics ran a Kickstarter campaign for re-releases of classic Gargoyles comics for the show's 30th anniversary. The campaign was fully funded in a single day. The campaign was a massive success, making $925,001 against a goal of $50,000.
