= Natsilane =

Human hero of the Tlingit/Haida Blackfish creation myth

Natsilane (/noʊtsaɪˈklɑːneɪ/ noht-sy-KLAH-nay) is the human hero of the "Blackfish" creation myth, one of the Tlingit and Haida stories about how the various supernatural animal species from the Tlingit culture of the American Northwest coast were created. These stories follow an almost dreamtime-like description of humans and other animal species living completely harmoniously. The animals are depicted as demi-gods, and are always referred to as proper singular nouns (for instance, "Raccoon" and "Raven"). There are other similar stories including how Raccoon got the rings on his tail and why Puma hides in the forest so much.

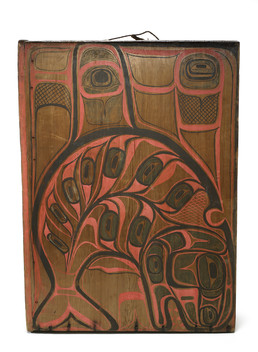
Tlingit box drum with painted Blackfish motif, 19th c.

Blackfish is arguably the most important creature in Haida culture. Blackfish is also highly revered in Tlingit culture because of his apparent affinity with humans. He represents an extremely powerful force of nature, deadly and terrifying to every creature except man, whom he is said to look after. The story describes why this is so. There are many variations to the tale, some considerably more brutal than others, and the exact details vary widely according to the storyteller, but the main theme of the story is always the same.

== Story ==
The tale starts with a young warrior, Natsilane, who is destined to become chief due to his skills, intelligence and generally pleasant demeanour. His brothers are extremely jealous of this, and plot to depose him. The brothers take Natsilane out to sea fishing, taking him further away from the shore than they have ever been before. As he becomes concerned, the brothers throw Natsilane overboard and row away.

As Natsilane is beginning to drown, he is found and rescued by Sea otter, who floats him to a large island saying it is too far back to the mainland for Sea otter to help him back. Instead, he promises to look after Natsilane and shows him the best hunting and fishing grounds. Once Natsilane is settled on his new island, alone, Sea otter confers one last gift to him, a pouch of seeds, and instructs Natsilane to sow them. Natsilane does so, and over the years the seeds grow into a bewildering array of tree species, all of which are now native in the Pacific Northwest. Natsilane uses wood from the trees to carve tools and a boat.

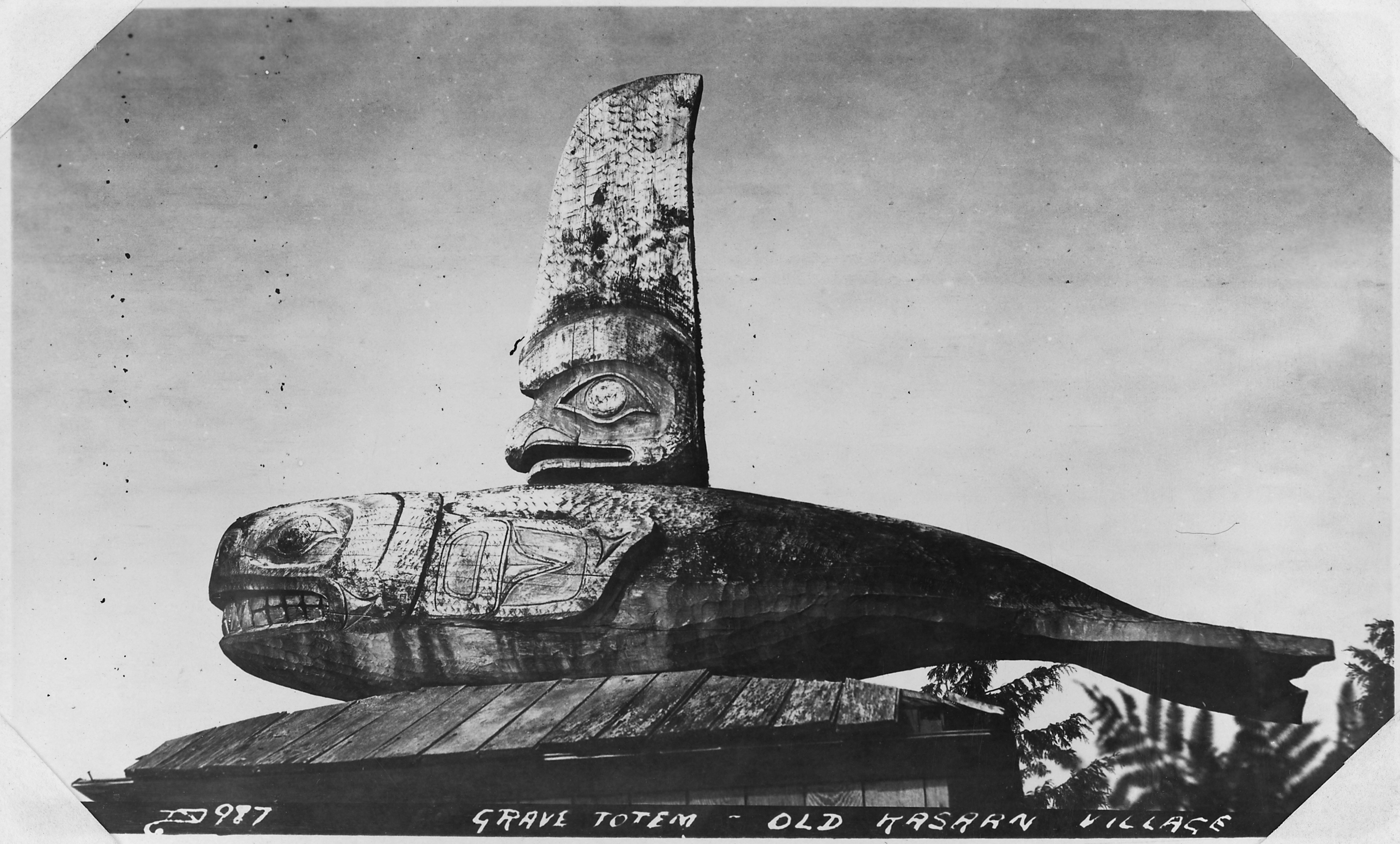
Haida grave totem with Blackfish motif, 19th c.

In appreciation of Sea otter, Natsilane then tries to carve a new totem. He tries all the trees, but settles on using a large yellow cedar tree and carves a huge fish from it, and leaves it on the shore for Sea otter to find. The next morning, when Natsilane goes down to the shore, the fish carving is gone and in the bay is swimming Blackfish, the first killer whale. With a boat and supplies, Natsilane travels back to his home, guided by Blackfish. When he arrives, he finds his brothers out fishing again, squabbling. He orders Blackfish to destroy their boat and drown his brothers, which it does immediately. When it returns, Natsilane orders that from this day forward it must never harm a human again, and that when it finds a human in trouble at sea it must help him. He then sends the whale off to sea. Natsilane returns to his village, which had been terrorised by his brothers, and becomes chief.

=== Variant ===
In another variant, Natsilane has married into a distant village; he is a skilled carver and hunter, and it is the jealous older brothers of Natsilane's wife who betray him. During a sea lion hunt, Natsilane leaps onto a rocky island, wounding a sea lion with his spear; rather than help, the older brothers-in-law fail to follow and maroon him on the deserted island, despite the protestation of the youngest brother-in-law, who idolizes Natsilane. As night falls, without a way to start a fire, Natsilane begins to freeze until he is rescued by a sea lion in the shape of a man.

It turns out his rescuer has been sent by the King of the sea lions, asking Natsilane to help save his son; Natsilane recognizes the king's son as the one he had wounded during the hunt. He is able to pull the broken spear from the sea lion's side, allowing the infected wound to drain. Overjoyed, the king safely conducts Natsilane back to his adopted village, where he briefly reunites with his wife, who had presumed him drowned after her brothers returned from the hunt without him. She brings his carving tools for him, and he takes them with him into the surrounding forest to camp in secret and plot his vengeance.

He first carves a Blackfish from spruce; testing the carving in a series of four pools leading to the cove, it briefly floats, then sinks in the first pool. The second carving is from red cedar; it leaps from the first pool to the second, but shortly thereafter sinks like the spruce carving. The third carving is from hemlock, which leaps from the first and second pools, but sinks in the third. His fourth carving, from yellow cedar, swims out to sea after successfully navigating the pools. Natsilane praises the King of the sea lions and instructs the yellow cedar Blackfish to sink the canoe of his brothers-in-law, who have set out on another hunt, but to spare the youngest.

After successfully sinking the canoe, Blackfish returns to Natsilane, who instructs him to never hurt another human; the youngest brother-in-law washes up ashore in the cove and eventually succeeds his father to become village chief. As for Natsilane, he is never seen again, although some claim to have seen him riding two killer whales far out to sea.

== Interpretation ==
The story has obvious themes of self-preservation, a reliance on the earth and karma, but it must be interpreted in a Tlingit mindset, where life and animals are equal to (if not more worthy than) humans. The Blackfish therefore represents the force of nature that can be achieved when nature and humankind are joined (whilst the carving is created by Natsilane, it is assumed Sea otter brings it to life). The rather brutal ending should not be misinterpreted either: this is a happy ending, where good and the natural world (Natsilane and the Blackfish) have prevailed over man alone (the brothers).

In the wild, orcas do not attack people; it is not clear if this is due to orca societal norms or because humans are not part of their regular diet. The only known orca-related human fatalities have all occurred at marine mammal parks where orcas were held in captivity.

== In popular culture ==
- A minor human character in the animated Disney series Gargoyles is named Natsilane.
- A variant of the Natsilane story is recounted in the 1993 film Free Willy, when Randolph helps Jesse understand his and Willy’s connection. The film's subtitles spell Natsilane's name as "Natsaclane". The story is also referenced in Free Willy 2: The Adventure Home.
