= Threefold division of England =

Thee different legal jurisdictions

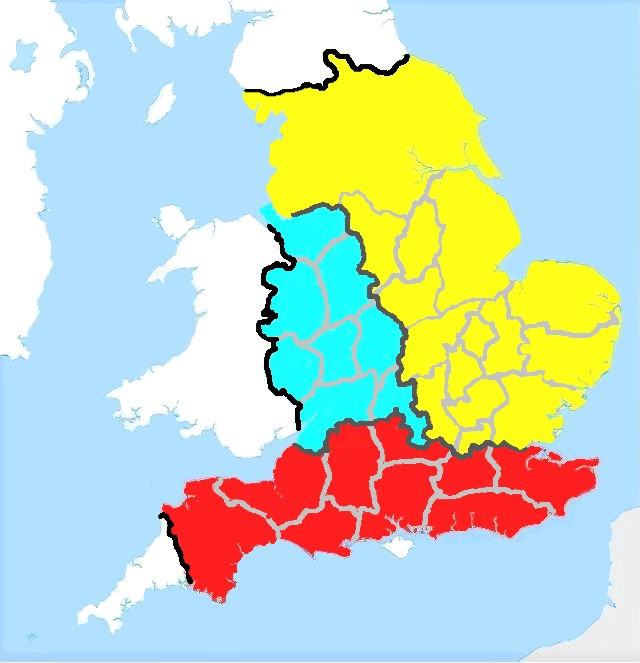
The threefold division of England, circa 1115.

The threefold division of England refers to the three different legal jurisdictions, Wessex, Mercia and the Danelaw, into which the Kingdom of England was divided, from the time of Cnut the Great (1016-1035) to the reign of King Stephen (1135-1154). These three areas each had their own separate legal system within England, inherited from the former kingdoms of Wessex and Mercia and the formerly Danish controlled territories of Northern and Eastern England.

== History ==
The territories of Cnut the Great

The Threefold Division is mentioned in the laws of Cnut the Great, William the Conqueror, Henry I, and Stephen who reigned up to the year 1154. The Henrician legal reforms of Henry II resulted in a simplification of legal systems used in England and the Threefold Division disappeared from legal texts after the 1150s.

== Structure ==
Each territory comprised a number of shires. Wessex had nine shires, the Danelaw fifteen shires, and Mercia eight shires. Cornwall, Scotland, Strathclyde, Bamburgh, Wales and the Isle of Wight were not included within these legal jurisdictions. Cornwall itself is separately mentioned in the laws as being divided into seven shires, these later became known as the hundreds of Cornwall. In the far North of England the shire structure was fairly new and the northern border with Scotland and Strathclyde was in a state of constant change during this period.

== Leges Henrici Primi ==
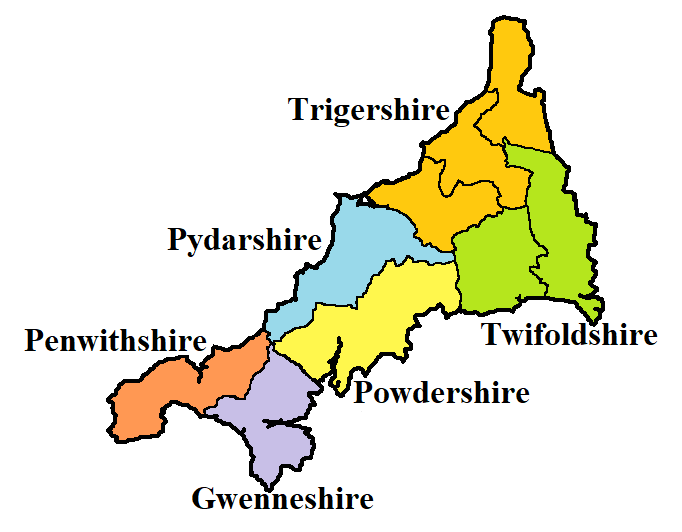
The ancient shires of Cornwall, Twifoldshire had already been divided into Eastern and Western shires by 1115, increasing the number from six to seven

The Leges Henrici Primi (Laws of Henry I), dated to circa 1115, define the Threefold Division of England as follows: "England has thirty-two shires besides Cumberland (Strathclyde) and Cornwall. In Cornwall are seven small shires. Scotland, Bretland (Wales) and the Isle of Wight are excepted. These thirty-two shires are divided according to three laws, Wessexlaw, Danelaw, and Mercianlaw. The Wessexlaw has nine shires, Sussex, Surrey, Kent, Berkshire, Wiltshire, Hampshire, Somerset, Dorset, Devonshire. The Danelaw has fifteen shires, Yorkshire, Nottinghamshire, Derbyshire, Leicestershire, Lincoln-shire, Northamptonshire, Huntingdonshire, Cambridgeshire, Bedfordshire, Norfolk, Suffolk, Essex, Hertfordshire, Middlesex, Buckinghamshire. The Mercianlaw has eight shires, Herefordshire Gloucestershire, Worcestershire, Shropshire, Cheshire, Staffordshire, Warwickshire, Oxfordshire."

== Bibliography ==
- Christopher Cannon, The Grounds of English Literature, 2004
- Francis Palgrave, The Rise and Progress of the English Commonwealth, Anglo-Saxon Period, Volume 1, 1832
- Frank Merry Stenton, Anglo-Saxon England, 2001
- Bruce Mitchell, Fred C. Robinson, A Guide to Old English, 2011
- Hannis Taylor, The making of the constitution, 1889
- Ella S. Armitage, The Childhood of the English Nation; Or, The Beginnings of English History, 1877
- Susan Reynolds, Ideas and Solidarities of the Medieval Laity: England and Western Europe, 1995
- Kapelle, William E (1979). The Norman Conquest of the North: The Region and its Transformation 1000–1135. Raleigh-Durham, NC: University of North Carolina Press. ISBN 0-8078-1371-0.
