= Earl of York =

English noble title

In Anglo-Saxon England, the Earl of York or Ealdorman of York was the ruler of the southern half of Northumbria. The titles ealdorman and earl both come from Old English. The ealdormanry (earldom) seems to have been created in 966 following a period when the region was under the control of Oswulf, already high-reeve of Bamburgh in northern Northumbria, from about 954, when Norse rule at York came to an end.

After the Norman Conquest of England in 1066, the Earldom of York was re-created on two occasions. In 1385, the title Duke of York was granted to Edmund of Langley and it continues in use as a royal dukedom, often given to the monarch's second son: for example Prince Andrew, Duke of York, born in 1960.

== Ealdormen ==
- Oslac (966–975)
- Thored (974x979–c. 994)
- Ælfhelm (c. 994–1006)
- Uhtred (1006–1016), ruled all Northumbria
- Eric (1016–1023)
- Siward (1023x1033–1055), ruled all Northumbria after 1041

== Later earls ==
- William le Gros, having already been charged with the defence of the city of York, was created earl by King Stephen in 1138. He was the king's administrator of all Yorkshire. In 1155 he was forced to relinquish the earldom to King Henry II.
- Otto of Brunswick was created earl of York by King Richard I in 1190. Otto had difficulty in proving the authenticity of this grant to his vassals in Yorkshire. He probably visited Yorkshire only once in 1191, although he continued to claim the revenues of the earldom after being elected King of Germany in 1198.

== See also ==
- Earl of Scarbrough
