= Eadwulf II =

Eadwulf II or Eadulf II may refer to:

- Eadwulf I of Bamburgh (d. 913), sometimes called Eadwulf II of Northumbria
- Eadwulf Evil-child (d. c. 970), also Eadwulf II of Bamburgh
