= Thored =

Ealdorman of York (fl. 979–992)

Ealdorman of York
- Reign: c. 964/974x979–992x994
- Predecessor: Oslac (?)
- Successor: Ælfhelm
- Born: c. 938 unknown
- Died: 992 or 994
- Burial: unknown
- Issue: Ælfgifu (died 1002); Æthelstan (died 1010)
- Father: Gunnar (probable)/ Oslac (potential)
- Mother: unknown

Thored (Old English: Þoreþ; fl. 979–992) was a 10th-century Ealdorman of York, ruler of the southern half of the old Kingdom of Northumbria on behalf of the king of England. He was the son of either Gunnar or Oslac, northern ealdormen. If he was the former, he may have attained adulthood by the 960s, when a man of his name raided Westmorland. Other potential appearances in the records are likewise uncertain until 979, the point from which Thored's period as ealdorman can be accurately dated.

Although historians differ in their opinions about his relationship, if any, to Kings Edgar and Edward the Martyr, it is generally thought that he enjoyed a good relationship with King Æthelred II. His daughter Ælfgifu married Æthelred. Thored was ealdorman in Northumbria for much of his reign, disappearing from the sources in 992 after being appointed by Æthelred to lead an expedition against the Vikings.

== Origins ==
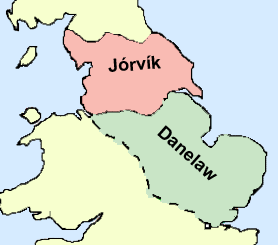
The area shaded under "Jórvik" (York), probably corresponds very roughly with Thored's territory of southern Northumbria; the Danelaw as a territory is a modern construct, though Yorkshire was in the area where Dena lagu ("Scandinavian law") was practised

Thored appears to have been of at least partially Scandinavian origin, suggested by the title applied to him in the Anglo-Saxon Chronicle entry for 992. Here, the ealdorman of Hampshire is called by the English title "ealdorman", while Thored himself is styled by the Scandinavian word eorl (i.e. Earl).

Two accounts of Thored's origins have been offered by modern historians. The first is that he was a son of Oslac, ealdorman of York from 966 until his exile in 975. This argument is partly based on the assertion by the Historia Eliensis, that Oslac had a son named Thorth (i.e. "Thored"). The other suggestion, favoured by most historians, is that he was the son of a man named Gunnar. This Gunnar is known to have held land in the East and North Ridings of Yorkshire.

If the latter suggestion is correct, then Thored's first appearance in history is the Anglo-Saxon Chronicle recension D (EF)'s entry for 966, which recorded the accession of Oslac to the ealdormanry of southern Northumbria:

In this year, Thored, Gunnar's son, harried Westmoringa land, and, in this same year, Oslac succeeded to the office of ealdorman.

The Anglo-Saxon scholar Frank Stenton believed that this was an act of regional faction-fighting, rather than, as had been suggested by others, Thored carrying out the orders of King Edgar the Peaceable. This entry is, incidentally, the first mention of Westmoringa land, that is, Westmorland. Gunnar seems to have been ealdorman earlier in the decade, for in one charter (surviving only in a later cartulary) dated to 963 and three Abingdon charters dated to 965, an ealdorman (dux) called Gunnar is mentioned.

Thored may be the Thored who appears for the first time in charter attestations during the reign of King Edgar (959–75), his earliest possible appearance being in 964, witnessing a grant of land in Kent by King Edgar to St Peter's, Ghent. This is uncertain because the authenticity of this particular charter is unclear. A charter issued by Edgar in 966, granting land in Oxfordshire to a woman named Ælfgifu, has an illegible ealdorman witness signature beginning with Þ, which may be Thored.

== Ealdorman ==
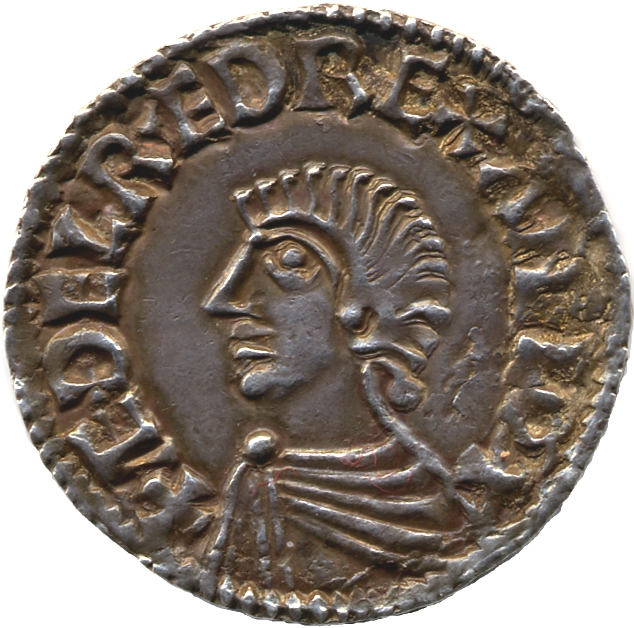
O: Draped bust of Æthelred II left. +ÆĐELRED REX ANGLOR

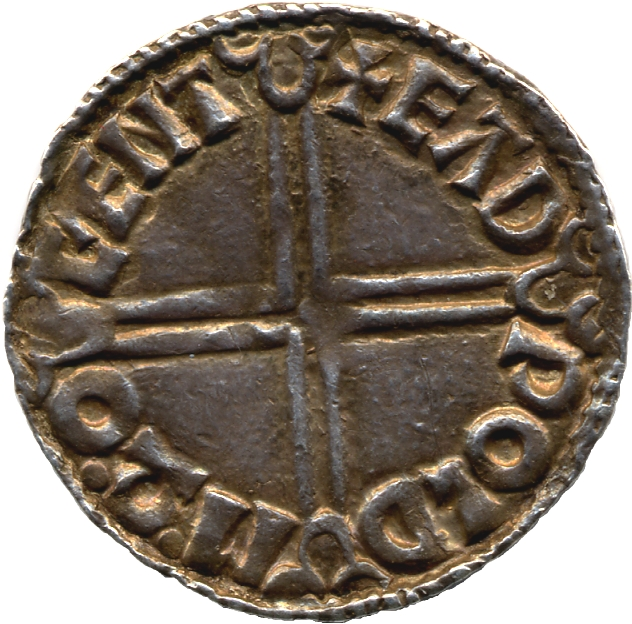
R: Long cross. +EADǷOLD MO CÆNT

'LonCross' penny of Æthelred II, moneyer Eadwold, Canterbury, c. 997–1003. The cross made cutting the coin into half-pennies or farthings (quarter-pennies) easier. (Note spelling Eadƿold in inscription, using Anglo-Saxon letter wynn in place of modern w.)

Thored's governorship as ealdorman, based on charter attestations, cannot be securely dated before 979. He did attest royal charters during the reign of Æthelred II, the first in 979, six in 983, one in 984, three in 985, one in 988, appearing in such attestations for the last time in 989. It is possible that such appearances represent more than one Thored, though that is not a generally accepted theory. His definite predecessor, Oslac, was expelled from England in 975. The historian Richard Fletcher thought that Oslac's downfall may have been the result of opposing the succession of Edward the Martyr, half-brother of Æthelred II. What is known about Thored's time as ealdorman is that he did not have a good relationship with Oswald, Archbishop of York (971–92). In a memorandum written by Oswald, a group of estates belonging to the archdiocese of York was listed, and Oswald noted that "I held them all until Thored came to power; then was St Peter [to whom York was dedicated] robbed". One of the estates allegedly lost was Newbald, an estate given by King Edgar to a man named Gunnar, suggesting to historian Dorothy Whitelock that Thored may just have been reclaiming land "wrongly alienated from his family".

His relationship with King Edgar is unclear, particularly given the uncertainty of Thored's paternity, Oslac being banished from England in 975, the year of Edgar's death. Richard Fletcher, who thought Thored was the son of Gunnar, argued that Thored's raid on Westmorland was caused by resentment derived from losing out on the ealdormanry to Oslac, and that Edgar thereafter confiscated various territories as punishment. The evidence for this is that Newbald, granted by Edgar to Gunnar circa 963, was bought by Archbishop Osketel from the king sometime before 971, implying that the king had seized the land.

Thored's relationship with the English monarchy under Æthelred II seems to have been good. Ælfgifu, the first wife of King Æthelred II, was probably Thored's daughter. Evidence for this is that in the 1150s Ailred of Rievaulx in his De genealogia regum Anglorum wrote that the wife of Æthelred II was the daughter of an ealdorman (comes) called Thored (Thorth). Historian Pauline Stafford argued that this marriage was evidence that Thored had been a local rather than royal appointment to the ealdormanry of York, and that Æthelred II's marriage was an attempt to woo Thored. Stafford was supported in this argument by Richard Fletcher.

== Death ==
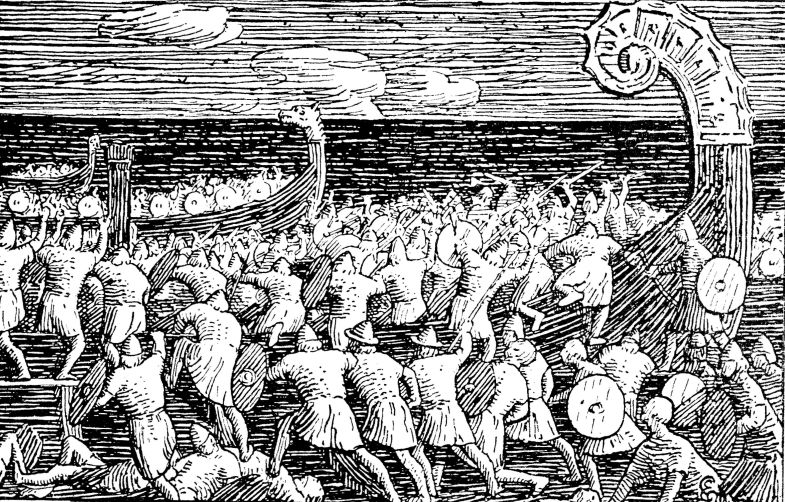
Modern imaginative depiction of the ship of Óláfr Tryggvason, the "Long Serpent" (Illustration by Halfan Egedius)

The date of Thored's death is uncertain, but his last historical appearance came in the Anglo-Saxon Chronicle, recension C (D, E), under the year 992, which reported the death of Archbishop Oswald and an expedition against a marauding Scandinavian fleet:

In this year the holy Archbishop Oswald left this life and attained the heavenly life, and Ealdorman Æthelwine [of East Anglia] died in the same year. Then the king and all his counsellors decreed that all the ships that were any use should be assembled at London. And the king then entrusted the expedition to the leadership of Ealdorman Ælfric (of Hampshire), Earl Thored and Bishop Ælfstan [.of London or of Rochester.] and Bishop Æscwig [of Dorchester], and they were to try if they could entrap the Danish army anywhere at sea. Then Ealdorman Ælfric sent someone to warn the enemy, and then in the night before the day on which they were to have joined battle, he absconded by night from the army, to his own disgrace, and then the enemy escaped, except that the crew of one ship was slain. And then the Danish army encountered the ships from East Anglia and from London, and they made a great slaughter there and captured the ship, all armed and equipped, on which the ealdorman was.

Scandinavians led by Óláfr Tryggvason had been raiding England's coast since the previous year, when they killed Ealdorman Brihtnoth of Essex at the Battle of Maldon.

Historians think that Thored was either killed fighting these Scandinavians, or else survived, but became disgraced through defeat or treachery. Fletcher speculated that Thored was removed from office and replaced by the Mercian Ælfhelm as a result of his failure against the Scandinavians. Another historian, William Kapelle, believed Thored was removed because of his Scandinavian descent, an argument based on the Worcester Chronicle's claim, added to the text borrowed from the Anglo-Saxon Chronicle, that Fræna, Godwine and Frythegyst fled a battle against the Danes in the following year because "they were Danish on their father's side".

A man named Æthelstan who died at the Battle of Ringmere in 1010, "the king's aþum", was probably Thored's son. The term aþum means either "son-in-law" or "brother-in-law", so this Æthelstan could also have been Thored's grandson by an unknown intermediary. Thored's immediate successor was Ælfhelm, who appears witnessing charters as ealdorman from 994.

== Notes ==
Regnal titles
Preceded by Oslac (?)	Ealdorman of York x 979–992 x 994	Succeeded by Ælfhelm
