= New Minster Charter =

Anglo-Saxon illuminated manuscript

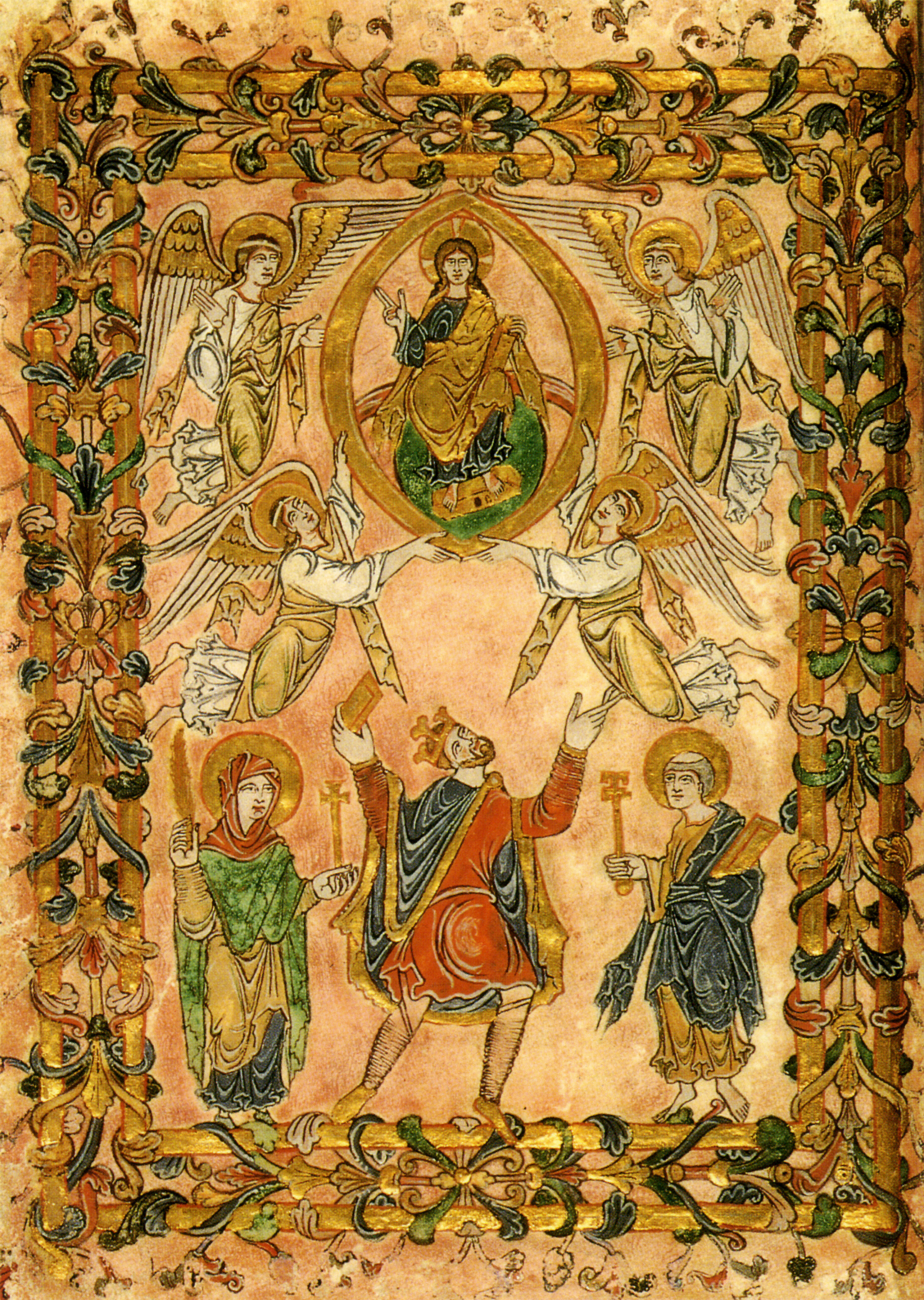
Frontispiece of the New Minster Charter. Edgar is flanked by the Virgin Mary and St Peter, and he is offering the charter to Christ, who sits enthroned above, surrounded by four angels.

The New Minster Charter is an Anglo-Saxon illuminated manuscript that was likely composed by Bishop Æthelwold and presented to the New Minster in Winchester by King Edgar in the year 966 AD to commemorate the Benedictine Reform. It is now part of the British Library's collection, Cotton MS Vespasian A VIII.

== Purpose and content ==
In approximately 963 AD, Bishop Æthelwold of Winchester required the monks of New Minster, under threat of eviction, to adopt Benedictine rule. This decision was made with the approval of King Edgar, who reigned in England from 959 until his death in 975. The charter was officially created as a codex to compile and present the royal grants which established the new laws of the New Minster, later to become Hyde Abbey. It is one of 34 surviving documents from the pre-Conquest archive of the New Minster, and stands out as an authentic document among numerous forgeries of its time. The text consists of 22 short chapters which outline the creation and fall of both angels and man, and also articulates Edgar's desire to do the will of God. It additionally explains why Edgar made the change from secular clerics to Benedictine monks, and references the relationship between the king and the abbey as a cycle of protection from spiritual and physical threats. There are an unknown number of missing leaves from the manuscript, the contents of which can merely be speculated.

== Style ==
Although the use of gold lettering was uncommon in England, every page of the New Minster Charter is written in gold, making it one of a kind. The insular style of lettering is present in the charter, which is written mainly in round Style I Anglo-Caroline script, with large capital letters marking the beginning of different sections of text. Aside from these stylized letters, the majority of the written pages have no other type of illumination. The only true exceptions are found near the beginning of the charter. One page presents the name of King Edgar, with blue wash and gold border. The king's name, presented as "Eadgar rex", is written in square capitals, with the remainder of the page written in uncials. The facing page contains a large chi-rho (also referred to as a chrismon) decorated in green and gold, and also framed in gold. The text of the page is written entirely in square capitals. preceding these pages is an elaborate frontispiece, the only fully illuminated page of the charter. Also noteworthy are the crosses adorning the witness list, some filled with gold and others merely outlined in brown or red. The significance of the different style of crosses is speculated to correlate somehow to the importance of each witness, but is not entirely known. Another stylistic feature that was unusual for its time is the presence of ten rhyming sentences of prose in chapter II.

== Frontispiece ==
The frontispiece of the New Minster Charter depicts King Edgar, situated between the Virgin Mary and Saint Peter, presenting the very charter the image adorns to Christ for blessing. Although Edgar appears to be kneeling, the use of gold on his feet and the edge of his cloak may have been applied with the intention of having the king standing and facing forward. The use of a rare purple tone associates the piece with imperial Byzantium, and the image reflects, in part, the royal Carolingian manuscript style of pieces such as the Prayer Book of Charles the Bald. However, it more specifically displays the trademarks of the Winchester style of the tenth century, with its wide use of gold as well as the presence of a border of wild acanthus leaves. The New Minster Charter is the first datable manuscript in the Winchester style, although the Benedictional of St Æthelwold is a better-known example from the 10th century.

== Sources ==
- Miller, Sean, ed. (2001). Charters of the New Minster, Winchester. Anglo-Saxon Charters. Oxford, UK: Oxford University Press for the British Academy. ISBN 978-0-19-726223-8.
