= Eadwulf Evil-child =

10th-century ruler of Bamburgh (fl. 968–970)

Eadwulf Evil-child Latin: Eadulphus cognomento Yvelcildus
- Born: 10th-century
- Title: Ruler of Bamburgh

Eadwulf II (fl. AD 968–970), nicknamed Evil-child (Old English: Yfelcild), was ruler of Bamburgh in the latter half of the tenth century. Although Eadwulf is sometimes described as the Earl of Northumbria, he ruled only a northern portion of Northumbria, a polity centred on Bamburgh that once stretched from the Firth of Forth to the River Tees.

== Name and family ==
The name evil-child itself is derived from the Old English words yvel and cild and it may have been given in apposition to the forename: 'happy wolf, evil child'. The details of Eadwulf's early life are not known except that his surname evil-child may indicate that he was a wild youth, with "evil-child" perhaps equating to "bad boy" in modern English. Alternatively, as cild, when used as a cognomen, was an Old English title borne by some Anglo-Saxon nobles to denote a man of high rank, it may be the case that Eadwulf acquired the name simply because he was a nobleman of bad character or because he was considered unworthy to hold noble rank.

His first name, Eadwulf, may indicate that he was related to a previous ruler of Bamburgh, Eadwulf 'II', who died in 913. There has been speculation that Eadwulf Evil-child may have been the son of Oswulf son of Eadwulf (II), whom Evil-child later succeeded as ruler of Bamburgh. It is very likely they were related. Eadwulf Evil-child alone among the known rulers of Bamburgh before 1067 is not mentioned in the surviving family pedigree reproduced by the twelfth-century historical tract De Northumbria post Britannos. Because of the lack of direct evidence, Evil-child may have been the son of either Oswulf or any of his brothers, three of whom are known: Ealdred, Uhtred or the figure known in one Irish source as Edulf mcEtulfe. Unlike Oswulf, Eadwulf Evil-child has no known descendants.

== Ruler of Bamburgh ==
The exact date of Eadwulf Evil-child's accession to Bamburgh is less than clear. His predecessor Oswulf's last strictly contemporary appearances is around 950, but Oswulf is also associated with the later killing of the southern Northumbria Norse king Eric of York, around 954. Eadwulf appears to act as a witness to charters issued for the king of England, issued between 968 and 970. (Note: Sawyer nos 766, 771, 779. 806.) It is likely no coincidence that the same period witnesses a rare appearance of a bishop of St Cuthbert in the south, Bishop Ælfsige. These seem to be the only appearances that Eadwulf makes in strictly contemporary sources. However, the identification of the "Eadulf dux" in the charters with Eadwulf Evil-child is not absolutely certain.

In the twelfth-century tradition most associated with the tract De primo Saxonum adventu, it is recorded that after the death of Oswulf, Northumbria was divided into two parts by the English king Edgar the Peaceful . The tradition tells us that Oswulf had previously held jurisdiction over southern Northumbria, but in the new arrangement the latter is given to Earl Oslac, with Eadwulf Evil-child given jurisdiction further north (variants give both the Tees and Tyne as their boundary). Eadwulf's land is said to be bounded in the north by 'Myreford' (probably the Firth of Forth). (Note: Alternative suggestions have included the River Tweed, the Solway, or some unknown location in East Lothian or what is now Berwickshire.) Eadwulf Evil-child's name is omitted in the variation of this tradition associated with another twelfth-century tract, De Omnibus Comitibus Northimbrensibus, probably because he was not considered by the eleventh century earls to be an important ancestor.

According to the version in the thirteenth-century tract attributed to John of Wallingford, King Edgar made this division during a council at York, in order to prevent the whole area becoming the inheritance of one man. At the ceremony Eadwulf was "girt with the sword" of his new earldom but he was not crowned. Dorothy Whitelock argued that both John of Wallingford's chronicle and De primo Saxonum adventu are based on a single lost source.

A variant of the tradition above adds a story King Edgar detached Lothian from Eadwulf's territory and ceded it to the Scottish king Cinaed mac Maíl Choluim ('Kenneth II'). Eadwulf, Oslac and Bishop Ælfsige are said to have escorted Kenneth to King Edgar who was at Chester; after Kenneth had reportedly done homage, Edgar rewarded Kenneth by granting him Lothian. The story is one of many tradition that purport to explain how the (in the twelfth-century) English-speaking province that later became Lothian and Borders were ruled by Scottish rather than English kings.

The tenth-century Chronicle of the Kings of Alba reports that during the reign of Kenneth II (r. 977–995) the 'son of the king of the Saxons' was captured during a Scottish raid. This is thought to be a reference to the son of a ruler of Bamburgh rather than a West Saxon English king, and so probably a son of either Evil-child or perhaps his successor Waltheof. Although no ancient sources mention what happened to the captured son, it has been speculated that Eadwulf ceded possessions north of the Tweed in exchange for his safe return.

Eadwulf's successor Waltheof attests a southern charter in 994, allowing us to assume that Eadwulf was either dead or deposed by that year. It has been speculated that Eadwulf failed to survive the political turmoil that afflicted England back in 975, during the succession crisis after the death of King Edgar. It has been suggested that both Eadwulf and Oslac backed the unsuccessful Æthelred the Unready rather than the successful Edward the Martyr as the successor to King Edgar and hence lost their positions. It has also been suggested that Eadwulf may have been deposed by powerful Northumbrian nobles or even assassinated.

== Notes ==
Preceded by Oswulf I	Ruler of Bamburgh floruit 954×968–970	Succeeded by Waltheof I
