= Edgar, King of England =

King of the English from 959 to 975

Edgar
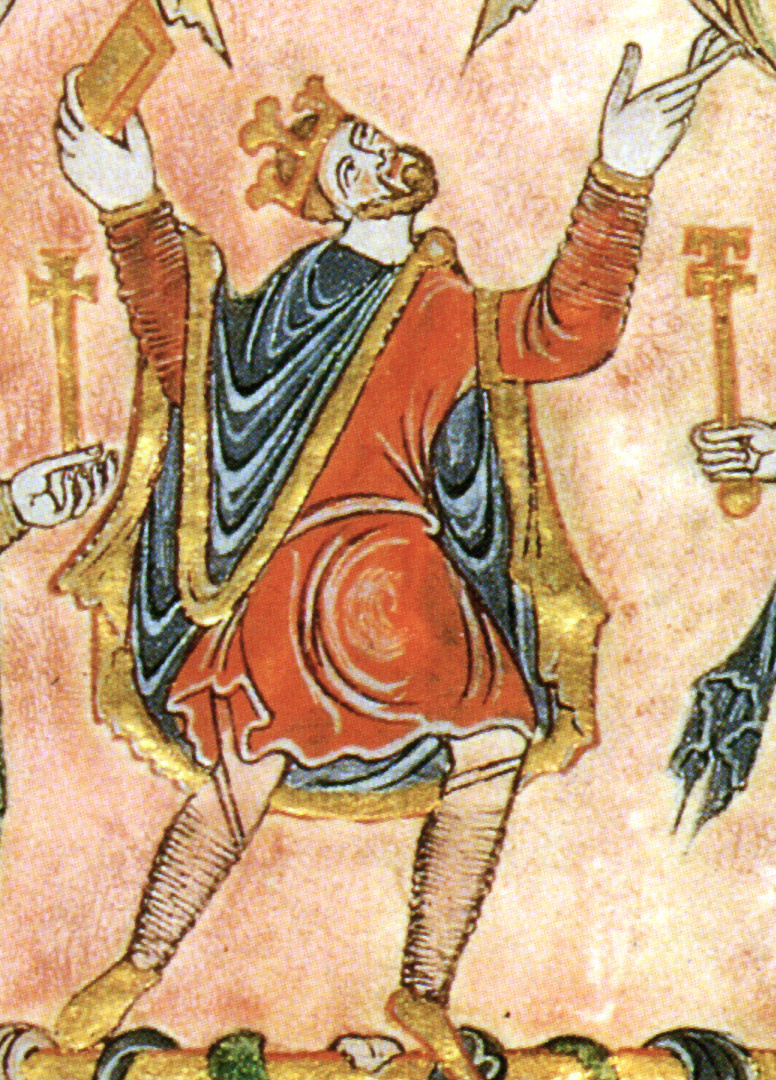
- Edgar's contemporary likeness from the New Minster Charter.

King of the English
- Reign: 1 October 959 – 8 July 975
- Coronation: 11 May 973
- Predecessor: Eadwig
- Successor: Edward the Martyr
- Born: 943/944; England
- Died: 8 July 975 (aged 31/32)
- Burial: Glastonbury Abbey
- Spouses: Æthelflæd; Wulfthryth; Ælfthryth
- Issue: Edward the Martyr; Edith of Wilton; Edmund; Æthelred the Unready
- House: Wessex
- Father: Edmund I
- Mother: Ælfgifu of Shaftesbury

Edgar (or Eadgar; c. 944 – 8 July 975), also known as Edgar the Peaceful, the Peacemaker and the Peaceable, was King of the English from 959 until his death in 975. He became king of all England on his brother Eadwig's death. He was the younger son of King Edmund I and his first wife, Ælfgifu. A detailed account of Edgar's reign is not possible, because only a few events were recorded by chroniclers and monastic writers, who were more interested in recording the activities of the leaders of the church.

Edgar mainly followed the political policies of his predecessors, but there were major changes in the religious sphere. The English Benedictine Reform, which he strongly supported, became a dominant religious and social force. It is seen by historians as a major achievement, and it was accompanied by a literary and artistic flowering, mainly associated with Æthelwold, Bishop of Winchester. Monasteries aggressively acquired estates from lay landowners with Edgar's assistance, leading to disorder when he died and former owners sought to recover their lost property, sometimes by force. Edgar's major administrative reform was the introduction of a standardised coinage in the early 970s to replace the previous decentralised system. He also issued legislative codes which mainly concentrated on improving procedures for enforcement of the law.

England had suffered from Viking invasions for over a century when Edgar came to power, but there were none during his reign, which fell in a lull in attacks between the mid-950s and the early 980s. After his death the throne was disputed between the supporters of his two surviving sons; the elder one, Edward the Martyr, was chosen with the support of Dunstan, the Archbishop of Canterbury. Three years later Edward was murdered; he was succeeded by his younger half-brother, Æthelred the Unready. Later chroniclers presented Edgar's reign as a golden age when England was free from external attacks and internal disorder, especially compared with Æthelred's disastrous rule. Modern historians see Edgar's reign as the pinnacle of Anglo-Saxon culture, but they disagree about his political legacy, and some see the disorders following his death as a natural reaction to his overbearing control.

== Sources ==
Edgar is described by the historian Ann Williams as "an enigmatic figure" because of the very limited information available on him, and Barbara Yorke describes his personality as "elusive". The Anglo-Saxon Chronicle (ASC) has only ten entries on his reign, and other sources dating to the late tenth and early eleventh centuries are mainly interested in the episcopal leaders of the English Benedictine Reform movement. There are further details in the works of post-Conquest monastic chroniclers, but their material is often legendary and unreliable. A few events have been recorded in detail, but it is not possible to write a chronological account of Edgar's reign.

== Background ==
In the ninth century, Anglo-Saxon England came under increasing attack from Viking raids, culminating in invasion by the Viking Great Heathen Army in 865. By 878, the Vikings had overrun the kingdoms of Northumbria, East Anglia, and Mercia, and nearly conquered Wessex, but in that year the West Saxons achieved a decisive victory at the Battle of Edington under King Alfred the Great. By 883, Æthelred, Lord of the Mercians, had accepted Alfred's overlordship, and in the 880s and 890s the Anglo-Saxons ruled Wessex and western Mercia, but the rest of England remained under Viking rule. Alfred died in 899, and in the 910s his son King Edward the Elder and daughter Æthelflæd, Lady of the Mercians, who was Æthelred's widow, conquered Viking-ruled eastern Mercia and East Anglia. Æthelflæd died in 918 and the Mercians installed her daughter Ælfwynn as the second Lady of the Mercians, but Edward seized her and established full control over Mercia.

Edward died in 924 and was succeeded by his eldest son Æthelstan, who may have been king only of Mercia at first, but ruled the whole of his father's realm by the next year. In 927, he conquered Northumbria, and thus became the first king of all England. He died in October 939 and was succeeded by his half-brother and Edgar's father, Edmund, who almost immediately lost control of the north to the Vikings, but recovered full control of England by 944. In May 946, he was stabbed to death trying to protect his seneschal from attack by a convicted outlaw, and as his sons Eadwig and Edgar were infants, their uncle Eadred became king. Like Edmund, Eadred inherited the kingship of the whole of England and soon lost it when York (southern Northumbria) accepted a Viking king, but he recovered it when the York magnates expelled Erik Bloodaxe in 954.

Eadred was very close to Edmund and inherited his leading counsellors, which resulted in a high degree of continuity of government when he became king. These counsellors included their mother, Eadgifu; Oda, Archbishop of Canterbury; Ælfsige, Bishop of Winchester; and Æthelstan, ealdorman (Note: Ealdorman was the second rank of the lay aristocracy below the king. They governed large areas as the king's local representatives and led local levies in battle.) of East Anglia, who was known as the Half-King because it was believed that kings depended on his advice. Another key adviser was Dunstan, Abbot of Glastonbury and future Archbishop of Canterbury. Eadred suffered from ill health, which became much worse towards the end of his reign. Most surviving charters of the last two years of his reign were produced by an agency associated with Glastonbury Abbey, and almost all of these were not attested by the king, suggesting that Dunstan was authorised to issue charters in Eadred's name when he was too ill to carry out his duties. Eadred was in his early thirties when he died on 23 November 955, and Eadwig succeeded at the age of around fifteen. He was the first king since the early ninth century not to face the threat of imminent foreign invasion, and England remained free from Viking attacks until 980.

== Early life ==
Edgar was the younger son of Edmund and his first wife, Ælfgifu, and he was born in 943 or 944, the year his mother died. She was a benefactor of Shaftesbury Abbey, an establishment for nuns, and was buried and venerated as a saint there. Her mother Wynflæd, who died around 950, was a vowess (religious woman), who was also a benefactor of the nunnery. Edgar was brought up by Ælfwynn, the wife of Æthelstan Half-King, and in about 958 Edgar gave her a ten-hide (400-hectare [1,000-acre]) estate at Old Weston in Huntingdonshire in gratitude. Æthelstan was a strong supporter of the Benedictine reform movement, which became dominant during Edgar's reign, and the historian Robin Fleming comments that Edgar ætheling (prince eligible for the throne) was profoundly influenced by his upbringing:

Thus, the ætheling was reared in the household of one of his father's closest allies and raised among Half-King's own brothers and sons, five of whom at one time or another were ealdormen. Since Half-King was an intimate of the reform circle, and St Dunstan in particular, Edgar came of age in an atmosphere dominated by the ideals of monastic reform. Some of Edgar's affection for monks and his determination to revive Benedictine monasticism must have been acquired in this household of his youth.

Eadwig and Edgar are not recorded in contemporary sources until 955, when they first attested charters, suggesting that they did not regularly attend court when they were young. Shortly before his death Eadred granted the secular (non-monastic) minster at Abingdon to Æthelwold, the future Bishop of Winchester, who converted it into a monastic establishment, Abingdon Abbey, with himself as its abbot. Edgar was educated there by Æthelwold, who was another leader of the monastic reform movement, and who was thus able to reinforce the young prince's belief in its virtues. As Eadwig succeeded shortly after Æthelwold's appointment, it is likely that Edgar's education at Abingdon was approved by his elder brother as king, and that Æthelwold and Eadwig were on good terms.

== Edgar in Eadwig's early reign, 955 to 957 ==
Eadwig became king on Eadred's death on 23 November 955. Historians have often been critical of Eadwig, portraying him as irresponsible or incompetent, and one piece of evidence cited for this view is the exceptional number of charters he issued in 956. His sixty-odd gifts of land in that year make up around five per cent of all genuine Anglo-Saxon charters, and no other ruler in Europe is known to have matched that yearly total before the twelfth century. The historian Ann Williams observes that the many charters may indicate that Eadwig had to buy support, but too little is known about the background to be certain.

When Eadwig succeeded, the court was ruled by powerful factions, and he appears to have been determined to show his independence of action from the start. In the view of the historian Ben Snook, "Eadwig, unlike his brother Edgar, was clearly his own man. Immediately on coming to power, he acted to put a stop to all this." Simon Keynes argues that "whether Eadwig and Edgar were able to assert their own independence of action, or remained at the mercy of established interests at court, is unclear". Eadwig quarrelled with some of his uncle's leading counsellors, especially Dunstan, whom he exiled abroad. Eadgifu had frequently attested charters in the reigns of her sons Edmund and Eadred, but she only attested one of Eadwig's, and she later alleged that she had been "despoiled of all her property" during his reign. On the other hand, Edgar was prominent at his brother's court between 955 and 957, attesting many of his charters, in one of which he is shown as regulus (underking).

Some of the hostility towards Eadwig was probably due to his promotion of his friends, especially Ælfhere, Ealdorman of Mercia, at the expense of the old guard, such as Dunstan. Ælfhere and his brothers were acknowledged by several kings as relatives, but the nature of the relationship is unknown. They were close to Eadwig and he made the eldest brother, Ælfheah, his discifer (seneschal). Ælfheah and his wife Ælfswith, who was also acknowledged by Eadwig as a relative, benefited from his generosity. Ælfhere, who was to become the pre-eminent lay magnate until his death in 983, was appointed an ealdorman in Mercia in 956. Other ealdormen appointed were Æthelstan Rota in Mercia in late 955 and Byrhtnoth, the future hero of the Battle of Maldon, who became ealdorman of Essex in 956. Eadwig appointed Æthelwold, the eldest son of Æthelstan Half-King, as an ealdorman in East Anglia. These were sound appointments of men from established families and Edgar kept them when he came to power. Frank Stenton, in his volume in the Oxford History of England, Anglo-Saxon England (described by Keynes as "magisterial and massively authoritative"), comments that "it can at least be said for King Eadwig that he agreed to the promotion of good servants".

== King of Mercia, 957 to 959 ==
In 957, the kingdom of England was divided between Eadwig, who kept Wessex, and Edgar who became king of Mercia, with the River Thames forming the boundary. It is uncertain whether this was the result of a coup against Eadwig or a decision to divide the kingdom between the brothers. Christopher Lewis (historian) sees the division as the solution to "a dangerously unstable government and a court in deep crisis"; Sean Miller and Rory Naismith attribute it to an unsuccessful attempt by Eadwig to promote a powerful new faction at the expense of the old guard. According to Dunstan's first biographer, who only named himself as "B": "King Eadwig was totally abandoned by the people north [of the Thames]. They despised him for his imprudent discharge of the power entrusted to him. The wise and sensible he destroyed in a spirit of idle hatred, replacing them with ignoramuses like himself to whom he took a liking." This is the view of a partisan of Dunstan, who was Eadwig's enemy. "B" was probably in exile with Dunstan when the division took place. Archbishop Oda forced Eadwig to divorce his wife Ælfgifu on the ground that they were too closely related, but Edgar was on good terms with her when he became king.

Four versions of the Anglo-Saxon Chronicle mention the division of the kingdom, and they all state that Edgar "succeeded" to the kingship of the Mercians, as if it was a normal and expected event. Manuscripts D and F of the Anglo-Saxon Chronicle (ASC D and ASC F), (Note: Manuscripts of the Anglo-Saxon Chronicle are conventionally labelled ASC A to H.) date the division to 955, whereas ASC B and ASC C correctly date it to 957. The difference in dates may be because it was agreed in Eadred's reign that the kingdom would be divided between the brothers, but he died before Edgar was old enough to act in person and had to wait until he reached the age of majority of fourteen in 957. Charter attestations show that the magnates did not decide which court to attend on the basis of personal loyalty: ealdormen and bishops with jurisdictions south of the Thames stayed with Eadwig, and those north of it served Edgar. Keynes comments: "One need not imagine that the unity of England would have been regarded in the 950s as something necessarily desirable for its own sake, not least because it was of such recent creation." Almost all thegns who had attested Eadwig's charters before the division stayed with him. The historian Frederick Biggs argues that the division was a revival of the earlier Anglo-Saxon practice of joint kingship, against the opposition of the Church, and Bishop Æthelwold complained that Eadwig had "through the ignorance of childhood dispersed his kingdom and divided its unity".

Eadwig retained some degree of seniority, as he attested charters as "King of the English", whereas Edgar was usually "King of the Mercians", and also occasionally of the Northumbrians and the British. (Note: Edgar is "King of the English" in two charters of 958, S 674 and S 679, but the style was probably copied from another charter without thinking that it needed to be adapted for Edgar's status.) All coins, including those issued in Mercia, were in Eadwig's name until his death, The contemporary chronicler Æthelweard, who may have been Eadwig's brother-in-law, wrote that he "held the kingdom continuously for four years". There is no evidence of rivalry between the brothers, but they did disagree over Dunstan. Edgar recalled him from his exile, and soon afterwards appointed him to the Mercian bishoprics of London and Worcester. Æthelstan Half-King retired when the division took place, perhaps because Edgar had reached an age to take over. In 958, Edgar gave an estate at Sutton in Nottinghamshire to Oscytel, Archbishop of York, probably in support of a policy initiated by Eadwig of strengthening control over this area of Viking settlement by granting land in it to the archbishop.

== Consorts and children ==
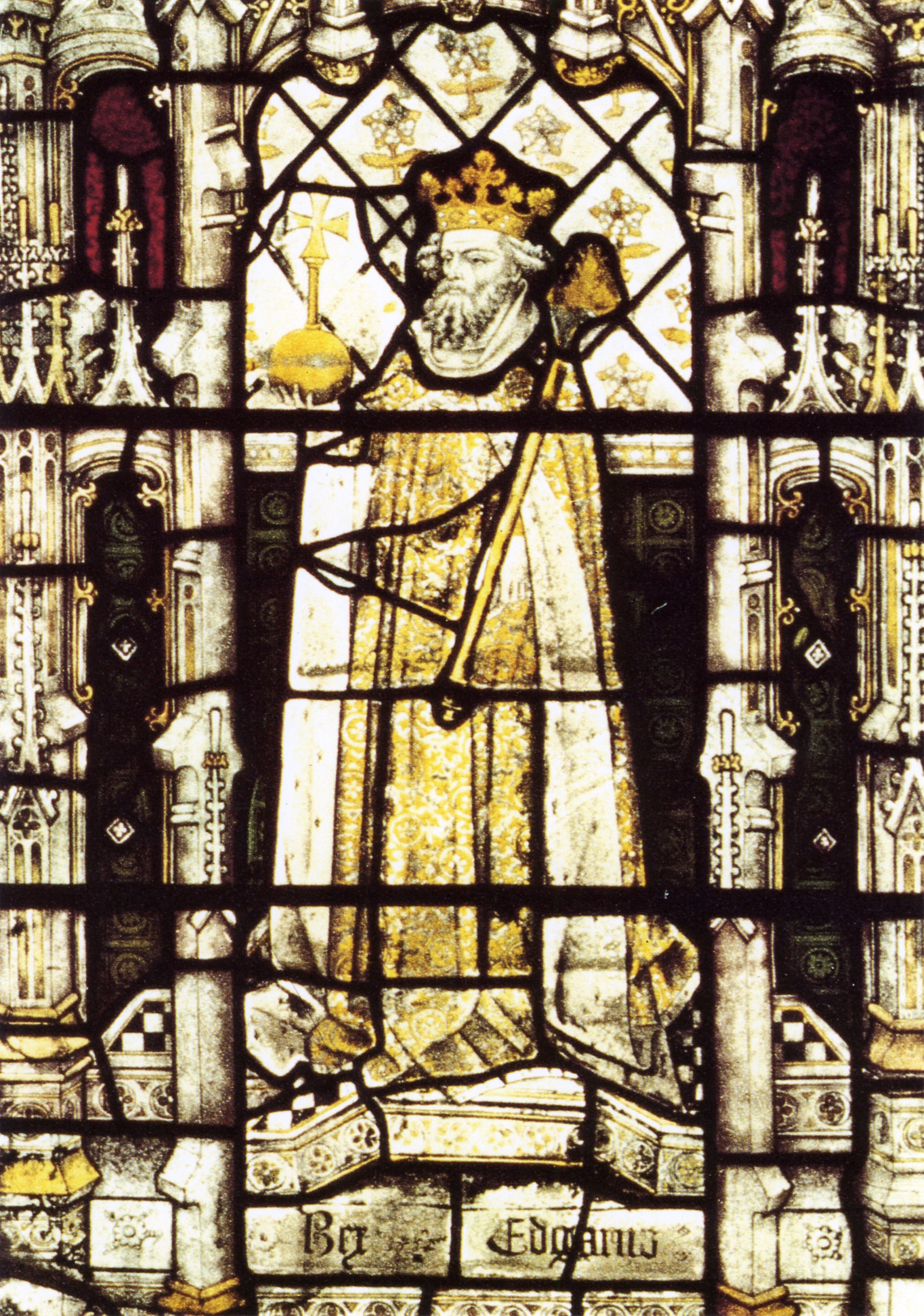
Edgar in the second tier of the Royal Window in the mid-fifteenth century chapel of All Souls College, Oxford. The stained glass is original apart from Edgar's head, which was replaced with one made by Clayton and Bell in the 1870s.

Edgar had children by three consorts. Almost all historians accept that he married the third one, but some question whether he married the first one and others the second. Yorke sees a case for recognising three marriages, as well as temporary liaisons. The name of his first consort, who was the mother of his eldest son, Edward the Martyr, was not recorded until after the Norman Conquest. According to Osbern of Canterbury, writing in the late eleventh century, she was a nun who was seduced by Edgar, but this is rejected by later chroniclers, and historians generally accept the statements of the twelfth-century writers John of Worcester and William of Malmesbury that she was Æthelflæd Eneda, the daughter of Ordmær. Ann Williams describes her as his wife, but Cyril Hart says that Edward the Martyr was of doubtful legitimacy. The chroniclers described Ordmær as an ealdorman, but no ealdorman or thegn with that name attested any surviving tenth century charter. According to the Liber Eliensis, a vir potens (powerful man) called Ordmær and his wife Ealde exchanged land with Æthelstan Half-King, and Edgar may have met Æthelflæd when he was Æthelstan's foster son. She probably died around 960. The historian Nicholas Brooks argues that Edgar must have married Æthelflæd because Dunstan backed her son's succession to the throne, and he would not have supported an illegitimate son.

Edgar's second consort was called Wulfthryth. According to the late eleventh century Benedictine writer Goscelin, Edgar wished to marry her cousin Saint Wulfhild, the daughter of a nobleman called Wulfhelm who had sent her to Wilton Abbey to be educated. Goscelin stated in his hagiography of Wulfhild that she resisted his determined advances as she wished to become a nun, and he agreed to marry Wulfthryth, who was also being educated at Wilton. They had a daughter, Edith. Williams regards it as uncertain whether they married, but Yorke argues that they did, pointing out that Goscelin stated that she and Edgar were "bound by indissoluble vows", and that Edith's personal seal, which still survives, describes her as the "royal sister" of Kings Edward and Æthelred, implying that they recognised her legitimacy. Wulfthryth returned to Wilton Abbey with her daughter by 964 and became a nun, allowing Edgar to remarry. He employed the Lotharingian scholar Radbod of Rheims, and the artist Benna of Trier, to educate Edith. Anglo-Saxon custom allowed for remarriage after a spouse entered a religious community, but on a strict interpretation of canon law, this was forbidden so long as the spouse lived, and so Edgar's third marriage may have had political repercussions. Wulfthryth and Edith were both later regarded as saints, but Wulfthryth's cult never became widely established, unlike that of Edith, who was the subject of another hagiography by Goscelin.

William of Malmesbury wrote that the Danish king Cnut had no affection for English saints, and "when at Wilton one Whitsun he poured out his customary jeers at Edith herself: he would never credit the sanctity of the daughter of King Edgar, a vicious man, an especial slave to lust, and more tyrant than king". William claimed that Cnut ordered her tomb to be broken into so that she could prove her sanctity, and when this was done she threatened to attack him, terrifying him into submission. Yorke comments that the story has been used by William "to highlight her father's reputation for immorality". Yorke sees a provision in the Regularis Concordia (Note: For the Regularis Concordia, see the 'Religion' section below) that monasteries were under the protection of the king and nunneries of the queen to avoid scandal as "a pointed reference to Edgar's priapic interest in nuns", which would have been seen as normal royal behaviour by most people. Williams observes that "the king's devotion to the Benedictine reform movement should not be taken as evidence of high personal morals".

Edgar's third consort was Ælfthryth, who was the widow of Ealdorman Æthelwold. He died in 962 and she married Edgar in 964. They had two sons, Edmund, who died young, and Æthelred, whose disastrous reign earned him the epithet of "the Unready". In 966 she attested the Winchester New Minster Charter as the "legitimate wife" of the king, and her recently born elder son Edmund attested as his "legitimate son", whereas Edward was described as "begotten by the same king", but it is uncertain whether this was on the king's instruction, which would indicate that he wished to cut Edward out of the succession, or was ordered by Bishop Æthelwold, who was a friend and ally of Ælfthryth. She was consecrated as queen in 973 and thereafter attested charters as regina, the first West Saxon queen to do so on a regular basis. Her consecration was a major change in status as previous West Saxon's kings' consorts had only been described as the king's wife, whereas she also had the status of being the queen.

Unlike Edgar's earlier consorts, Ælfthryth became politically influential, and Edgar appointed her father, Ordgar, as ealdorman of Devon. Williams describes her as "a force to be reckoned with"; Pauline Stafford regards her as "one of the most important tenth-century queens" and comments that "Ælfthryth, if not Eadgifu, heralded a new dawn in the history of English queens". Both women had a dominant position over other royal women, and both were most powerful as queen mothers, in Ælfthryth's case during the minority of her son Æthelred. She was later accused of being responsible for the murder of Edward the Martyr to make her own son king.

== King of England ==
Edmund was killed in 946 trying to protect his seneschal from attack by an outlaw, and because his children were infants he was succeeded by his younger brother Eadred, who ruled until his death in 955. Edgar's older brother, Eadwig, then became king and in 957 the kingdom was divided, Eadwig ruling south of the Thames and Edgar north of it. Historians disagree whether this was the result of a revolt by Edgar's supporters against Eadwig's incompetent rule or had been previously agreed.

=== Administration ===
Edgar became king of the whole of England when Eadwig died on 1 October 959, and his former tutor Æthelwold became one of the most powerful figures at court. He was probably in Edgar's personal service as an adviser from 960 until 963, when the king appointed him Bishop of Winchester. Dunstan, who became Archbishop of Canterbury at the start of Edgar's reign, was diligent in attending court, and in the historian Alan Thacker's view: "While Æthelwold's characteristic context is his monastic empire, Dunstan's is the royal court". In the early 970s the leading secular magnates were Æthelwine, Ealdorman of East Anglia (Æthelwold's brother and successor), Ælfhere of Mercia, Oslac of York and Byrhtnoth of Essex.

The charters of the 960s and early 970s are similar and do not suggest political change in the period, but from the late 960s northern magnates were more regularly represented. In 954, Eadred had appointed Osulf, the ruler of the north Northumbrian territory of Bamburgh, as the ealdorman of the whole of Northumbria following the expulsion of the Viking king of York, Erik Bloodaxe. Osulf did not owe his power to southern English support, and when he died in the 960s Edgar again divided Northumbria and appointed Oslac as ealdorman of York (southern Northumbria), increasing his control over the area, but he was not able to choose who held power in Bamburgh.

Ealdormen were important in providing stability in a period when kings died young, but the families of Æthelwine of East Anglia and Ælfhere of Mercia gained unassailable positions and their rivalries were a threat to the stability of the kingdom. Edgar was able to keep them under control, but these tensions collapsed into open hostilities after his death. Ealdormen for areas south of the Thames do not attest after 970, and this may be because Edgar chose to govern these areas through royal officials of lower status. Reeves may have been entrusted with duties which were previously carried out by ealdormen. This made his rule less uniform, with different methods of government in different areas. The gap was filled after his death by the appointment of three new southern ealdormen.

Kingship was peripatetic. There was no fixed capital city and the court moved from one royal estate to another, four or five times a year. According to John of Worcester, each winter and spring Edgar would travel round the kingdom to enquire whether the statutes he had promulgated were being observed and whether the poor were being unjustly treated by the powerful. The historian Richard Huscroft describes this account as "perhaps a little rose-tinted". Harrying was a standard punishment for crimes committed by communities, and in 974 Edgar ordered the people of Thanet to be deprived of their property and some of them executed, because they had robbed passing traders from York. Forfeiture of land for wrongdoing gave the king opportunities for patronage or receiving payments for remission of punishment. In one case, Edgar rescinded a forfeiture for 100 mancuses (Note: A mancus was an amount of gold in weight, coin or value worth 30 pence.) of gold, and in another he restored several confiscated estates for 120 mancuses.

=== Charters ===
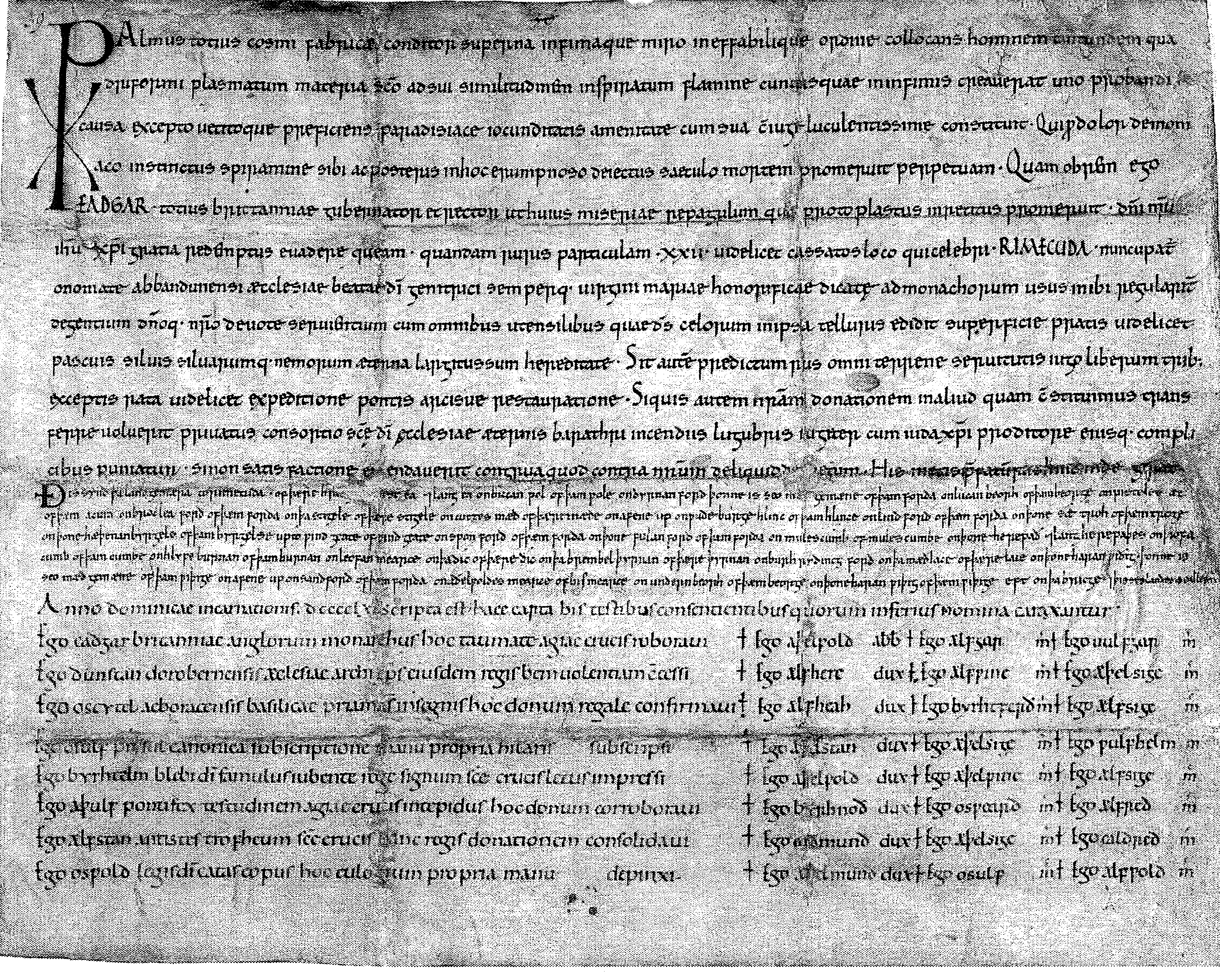
Charter of King Edgar for Abingdon Abbey in 961, written by the scribe known as Edgar A. London, British Library, Cotton Augustus ii. 39

Since the 930s, charters had been produced by a royal secretariat, but this probably did not survive the division of 957 to 959 in unchanged form. When Edgar succeeded in 959 he appears to have preferred to retain the secretariat he had employed as king of Mercia rather than use the one he had inherited from Eadwig. Edgar's charters were written in competent but formulaic and derivative Latin, drawing on the prose of much earlier charters. They are more diverse in style than those of previous kings, and Snook argues that this does not indicate a decline in central control, but rather the increasing sophistication of the Anglo-Saxon bureaucracy. Although there is great variety in the charters' proems (introductions), and in the sanctions against anyone defying the provisions of the charter, the political and legal protocols follow a stable tradition.

The charters fall into several groups. Most belong to the "diplomatic mainstream", including those produced by the scribe known as Edgar A. Scholars disagree about his location. Richard Drögereit in the 1930s and Pierre Chaplais in the 1960s linked the scribe with Æthelwold's Abingdon, and perhaps with Æthelwold himself. Keynes argued in 1980 that he was probably a priest in the royal writing office, and Susan Kelly defended the older view in 2000. Edgar A started drafting when Edgar was king of Mercia and a significant proportion of charters in the early 960s were produced by him. He ceased work in 963, but some charters later in the reign were produced by scribes who adopted his style. Another group is associated with Dunstan and called the Dunstan B charters. They were produced between 951 and 975, with a break in Eadwig's reign. The ones dating to the period when Edgar was only king of Mercia were not personally attested by him. There were also charters produced by midlands and west country agencies, and in some cases the beneficiary may have played an important role in the drafting.

Charters are problematic sources because of the difficulty of distinguishing genuine ones from the many forgeries. About 160 charters of Edgar survive, including 10 dating to 957 to 959 when he was king of Mercia. Most of the Mercian ones, and around 100 of those he issued as king of the English, are substantially genuine, the highest numbers being in 961 to 963 and 968. They are mainly standard grants of land to religious houses or individuals, with a few more complex ones such as the one granting privileges to the New Minster, Winchester (see image below). (Note: Edgar's charters are listed with comments in Keynes's "A Conspectus of the Charters of King Edgar 957–975".) Most charters are only known from later copies, but sixteen survive as single sheets which are or may be originals. Some give Edgar's regnal year, and the start date they were based on varied, some being from 959, 960 and 973, but most often 957. Like Æthelstan, Edgar used the title king of the English in some charters and king of Britain in other ones, and Keynes comments that "the consistent usages of Edgar's reign represent nothing less than a determined reaffirmation of the polity created by Æthelstan in the 930s".

=== Law ===
Four law codes have been attributed to Edgar, but the correct number is two. The Hundred Ordinance was formerly called I Edgar by historians, but it does not say who issued it, and it may date to an earlier king. II and III Edgar are the ecclesiastical and secular sections of one set of provisions, known as the Andover Code. IV Edgar is thus the second code. Edgar was more concerned with the administration of the law than its substance. His primary concern was to ensure that existing laws were properly enforced. Law codes were not unilateral royal pronouncements, but issued with the advice of the king's councillors.

The legal historian Patrick Wormald describes the Andover Code as impressive and rational. II Edgar covers ecclesiastical matters, especially church dues. For the first time, a specific penalty was prescribed for non-payment of tithes, and anyone who did not pay Romescot, the penny due to the Pope, had to take it to Rome – a penalty theoretical rather than real. III Edgar is concerned with making justice accessible, preventing unjust judgments, standardisation of weights and measures, and that "one coinage is to be current throughout all the king's dominion". Plaintiffs had to exhaust other avenues before they were allowed recourse to the king, judgements had to be just and punishments had to be appropriate. Courts were to be held regularly, and every man was to provide himself with a surety to hold him to his legal duty. The preservation of order required the cooperation of the secular and religious authorities, but it is not until III Edgar that ealdormen and bishops were required to work together in the judgement of legal cases.

IV Edgar is more wordy than the Andover Code and more rhetorical than any previous one. It has attracted the most attention by historians as it recognises the separate customs of the former Viking Kingdom of York, which was to have "such good laws as they best decide on". Wapentakes, the name in the northern Danelaw for the administrative divisions known to the Anglo-Saxons as hundreds, are first mentioned in this law code. One exception to the concession that the Danelaw was to have its own customs was a provision to make the sale of stolen goods more difficult. At least twelve sworn witnesses were to be appointed in each burh, hundred and wapentake, and all transactions had to be witnessed by two or three of these witnesses. Shires, hundreds and wapentakes began to play an important part in the king's control over the population around this time. IV Edgar refers "to all the nation, whether Englishmen, Danes or Britons, in every province of my dominion", recognising that Edgar's subjects were made up of three distinct political communities. He ordered that many copies of the code be sent to ealdormen Ælfhere and Æthelwine, so that they can be widely distributed and made known to rich and poor.

The late tenth-century hagiographer, Lantfred of Winchester, writing at about the time that Edgar died, stated:

At the command of the glorious King Edgar, a law ... was promulgated throughout England, to serve as a deterrent against all sorts of crime ... that if any thief or robber were found anywhere in the patria, he would be tortured at length by having his eyes put out, his hands cut off, his ears torn off, his nostrils carved open and his feet removed; and finally, with the skin and hair of his head shaved off, he would be abandoned in the open fields dead in respect of nearly all his limbs, to be devoured by wild beasts and birds and hounds of the night.

Edgar's known laws do not specify mutilation, although IV Edgar does refer a list of punishments which does not survive. A code of Cnut specifies similar punishments, and its author, Archbishop Wulfstan of York, stated that Cnut's legislation was based on the laws of Edgar. Wormald describes the punishments as "ghastly", and Keynes observes that it is no wonder that Edgar was hailed as "the strongest of all kings", but that if we are disposed to admire the peace he brought then we should bear in mind the measures he took to enforce it.

Cnut held up Edgar's legislation as the precedent to be followed, and declared in a proclamation of 1020 that everyone should "steadfastly observe the law of Edgar." ASC D states that in 1018 the Danes and the English reached an agreement "according to Edgar's law". In a letter from Cnut to his subjects in 1019/20, he referred to a law code agreed at Oxford, which he described as Edgar's law, and urged people to keep to it. In Wormald's view, Cnut considered that his regime was based on the Oxford agreement to keep to Edgar's law. However, the code bears little resemblance to Edgar's legislation, and the reference to him was probably symbolic as a revered lawmaker, rather than practical as a source. Edgar's legislation continued to be held in high regard after the Norman Conquest, and the twelfth-century historian Eadmer referred to the "holy laws" of "the most glorious king Edgar", although there is no evidence that he knew the codes.

=== Coinage ===
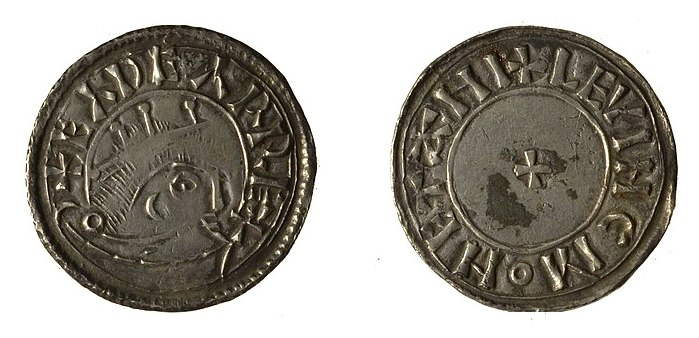
Coin of Edgar, pre-reform, Bust Crowned, moneyer Levinc, East Anglia

The only coin in common use in late Anglo-Saxon England was the silver penny, but a few halfpennies were also produced and nine are known for Edgar. Edgar's coinage is divided into two phases, pre-reform which broadly carried on the diverse coinage design of his immediate predecessors, and the major reform near the end of his reign.

There had been an increase in regional variation in coinage in the reigns of Edmund and Eadred, especially in Northumbria, which switched back and forth between English and Viking control, and the permanent restoration of control over the north after 954 allowed a gradual return to the greater unity of Æthelstan's coinage. Edgar's pre-reform coin designs included Horizontal types, which continued from Eadwig's reign. The Circumscription Cross type was introduced under Æthelstan and was rare for the next twenty years, before becoming common under Edgar. The Bust Crowned type (see image) also became much more common in Edgar's reign. (Note: Horizontal coin types have the moneyer's name horizontally on the reverse in two lines. Common horizontal types in Edgar's reign were HT (with trefoils top and bottom) and HR (with Rosettes instead of trefoils). The Circumscription Cross type has a cross in the middle on both sides of the coin, surrounded by the name of the king on the obverse and the moneyer on the reverse. The Bust Crowned type has the head of the crowned king on the obverse, often crudely drawn.) Edgar's early coinage is described by Naismith as "an important step towards the fundamental change" of the reformed coinage. Æthelstan's reign and Edgar's pre-reform coinage are the only pre-reform periods when the mint place was commonly shown, and even in these periods many coins did not show the information. Thirty mint-places are named on Edgar's pre-reform coins, and another six are inferred by numismatists for coins which do not show the town. There was a gradual decline in the standard of coinage from the reigns of Alfred and Edward the Elder until Edgar's reform. In most of the first half of the tenth century the fineness of the coinage was maintained at a high level, with over 90% silver. A few less fine coins were produced in the 950s, and the number increased significantly in Edgar's pre-reform coinage. The average weight of coins had gradually declined since the reign of Edward the Elder, and this continued into Edgar's time.

Edgar's reformed coinage brought in standardised designs over the whole country. It was modelled on Æthelstan's coinage and had been partly prefigured in the previous fifteen years. It was of a high and uniform fineness (proportion of silver), compared both with the preceding period and with most other contemporary European coinages, with about 96% silver. The weight increased, but there were still regional variations. All mints used the same design, with the king's bust facing left on the obverse in an inner circle with his name around the outside as +EADGAR REX ANGLOR[UM]. On the reverse was a small cross in the middle, surrounded by the moneyer's name and the mint location. The design was not original: it was very similar to Æthelstan's Bust Crowned coinage, but uniformity over the whole kingdom was completely new. The reform of the coinage is not recorded in documentary sources until the thirteenth century, when Roger of Wendover was the only chronicler to mention it. It is not known exactly when the reform was introduced, but it was towards the end of his reign. The fineness of coins became more geographically uneven after his death.

Edgar's standardization of the coinage reflects his concern with uniformity, and his ability to impose the change shows the strength of his control. It was part of his determined effort towards the end of his reign to increase the secular and spiritual cohesion of his kingdom. For the first time, all of the approximately forty mints were producing a uniform design of coin. Edgar's coinage reform is described by the historian Levi Roach as "one of the crowning achievements of late Anglo-Saxon kingship". It lasted for more than one hundred and fifty years.

=== Religion ===
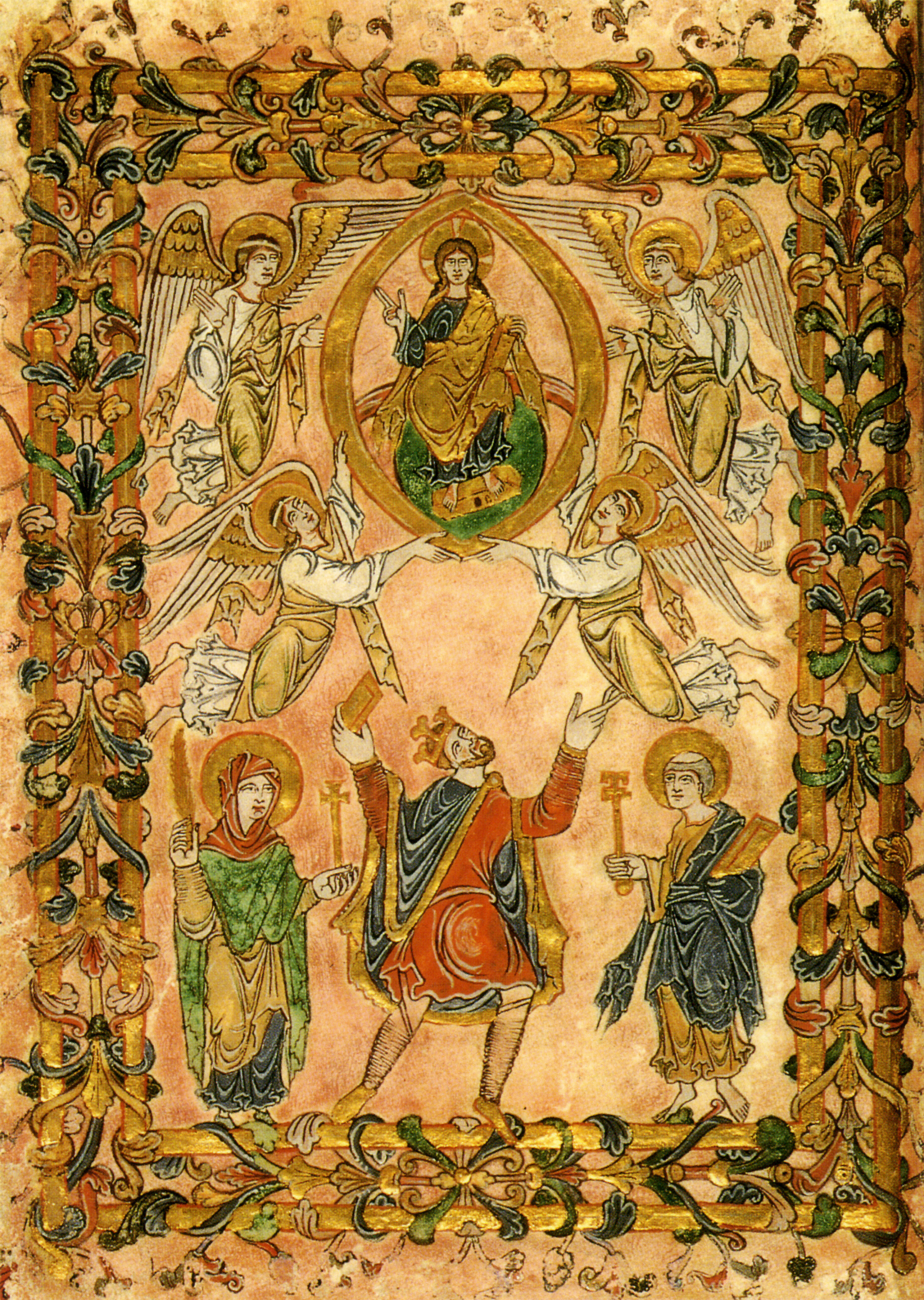
Frontispiece of the Winchester New Minster Charter of 966, the only illuminated charter and the only manuscript written entirely in gold to survive from Anglo-Saxon England. Edgar is flanked by the Virgin Mary and St Peter, and he is offering the charter to Christ, who sits enthroned above, surrounded by four winged angels.

As king of Mercia in 958, Edgar granted land to St Werburgh's Minster, Chester. This was an unreformed community, a house of secular clergy, and would have been an unlikely beneficiary of royal patronage later in Edgar's reign. The Benedictine reformers later presented his accession as a victory for their cause, but this donation shows that monastic status was not then crucial for him and his advisers.

Earlier kings had supported reform, but there were only two Benedictine monasteries when Edgar came to the throne, and his support was key to the wider success of the movement. In Stenton's view, his accession to the throne of England led to few changes in secular personnel, but it caused momentous changes in the church. He comments: "There is no doubt that in the re-establishment of English monasticism, which is the principal achievement of this period, the enthusiasm of King Edgar was the decisive factor." He favoured all three of the leading figures in the movement, Dunstan, Oswald and Æthelwold. Oda had died in 958, and Eadwig's choice of successor as Archbishop of Canterbury, Ælfsige, froze to death in the Alps on the way to get his pallium from the Pope. Byrhthelm, Bishop of Wells, was Eadwig's second choice, but when Edgar succeeded, he dismissed Byrhthelm on the ground that he was too gentle to maintain discipline and appointed Dunstan. Oswald became bishop of Worcester in 962 and then archbishop of York in 971 without relinquishing Worcester.

In the early years of Edgar's reign, the third monastic leader, Æthelwold, was the only abbot who attested charters, showing his special status. He was a strong critic of secular clergy (sometimes called canons), who were able to marry, unlike monks. Following his appointment as Bishop of Winchester in 963, Æthelwold converted the city's New Minster into an institution exclusively of monks. Edgar successfully sought papal authority for the forcible expulsion of the canons and sent an armed force under a royal official to help in carrying it out. In 966, he granted privileges to the new community in a magnificent charter (see image), which referred to the cleansing of the church by the driving out of the canons and recorded the grant of the New Minster to Christ by Edgar, who is described as vicarius christi (vicar of Christ). One of the main justifications for the king's involvement was that the canons' sinful nature meant that their prayers for him were worthless.

Edgar and Ælfthryth granted Æthelwold an estate at Sudbourne on condition that he translate the Regula S. Benedicti (Rule of Saint Benedict) from Latin into English to assist the religious instruction of the laity, and the translation survives. The Regularis Concordia (Note: The full name of the Regularis Concordia is given in the title of Thomas Symons's 1953 edition: Regularis Concordia Anglicae Nationis Monachorum Sanctimonialiumque: The Monastic Agreement of Monks and Nuns of the English Nation.) laid down rules for English monasteries. It was written as a result of instructions sent by Edgar to a synod at Winchester to draw up a single monastic rule for all England, and it exhibits his desire for unity and uniformity. He urged his bishops, abbots and abbesses, "to be of one mind regarding monastic usage ... lest differing ways of observing the customs of one Rule and one country should bring their holy conversation into disrepute". The Regularis Concordia instructed that psalms be said several times a day for the king and queen in all monasteries, and required the consent of the king for the election of abbots. The document dates to around 973, perhaps after Edgar's coronation in Bath on 11 May. (Note: For Edgar's coronation, see the 'Events in 973' section below.)

Continental reformers accepted that secular clergy had their place in the church, and Dunstan and Oswald agreed. They did not expel the canons from their cathedral communities. Æthelwold was more extreme, and in a text known as "King Edgar's Establishment of Monasteries", he wrote that Edgar:

cleansed holy places from all men's foulnesses, not only in the kingdom of the West Saxons but in the land of the Mercians also. Assuredly he drove out canons who abounded beyond measure in the aforesaid sins, and he established monks in the foremost places of all his dominion for the glorious service of the Saviour Christ. In some places also he established nuns and entrusted them to his consort, Ælfthryth, that she might help them in every necessity.

The reformers practised personal austerity, but their masses, liturgy and prayers became more and more lavish along Continental lines, and they worked vigorously to increase the land and wealth of the monasteries to pay for the buildings and objects required. The reformers did not only receive physical and financial support from Edgar and his officials, but also from other members of the laity. In addition, the leaders of the movement were wealthy aristocrats who used their own resources to support the movement. Æthelwold paid Edgar 200 mancuses of gold and a silver cup worth five pounds to renew privileges of Winchester Old Minster, granted by Edward the Elder, in relation to a large estate at Taunton, and Æthelwold also paid Ælfthryth 50 mancuses "in return for her help in his just mission". Æthelwold relentlessly pursued land claims through the courts on behalf of monasteries in his diocese, and Edgar frequently intervened to support him. After his death landowners brought legal actions, and sometimes used violence, to recover estates lost by the aggressive and dubious claims of monasteries. Even the greatest magnates were not immune from the reformers' demands, and Æthelwine brought a successful action to recover an estate of forty hides in Hatfield, complaining that Edgar had forced him and his brothers to surrender it to Æthelwold. The anti-monastic reaction following Edgar's death shows how dependent the reformers were on the king's support, but no writings survive of the reformers' opponents to show how they saw Edgar.

Edgar's support for the reformers earned him extravagant praise in the works of Benedictine authors such as Byrhtferth and Wulfstan, both writing in the late 990s. The reformers gave Edgar a status which was almost theocratic, and he is compared in the Regularis Concordia to the Good Shepherd. The contemporary theologian Ælfric of Eynsham also praised Edgar; he urged obedience to monarchy, which he regarded as divinely instituted. The historian Catherine Karkov observes that: "From the very beginning of his reign Edgar had been portrayed as an able and powerful basileus, whose kingship derived directly from God". The reform was the English branch of a European movement, and monasteries in post-Carolingian Europe universally followed the Regula S. Benedicti, but Wormald comments that "England was the only place in post-Carolingian Europe where monastic uniformity was a matter of political principle".

Like other kings, Edgar was generous in his donations to churches. In 970 Æthelwold re-founded the community of secular priests at Ely Abbey as a house for monks with the generous support of Edgar, whose gifts included a cross covered in gold and silver gilt, together with golden images and precious stones; a cloak embellished with gold; and a gospel book gilded with precious stones and enamels. He was a major patron of Romsey Abbey, a Benedictine nunnery which was founded or refounded in 967, and his son Edmund was buried there. Edgar also supported the Old Minster, Winchester, which had the body of Saint Swithun. In 971, the saint's body was translated from its tomb in the grounds to one inside the minster, on the order of Edgar and with the support of Æthelwold. This was the start of a major new cult. A second translation was carried out in around 974. Swithun's relics were carried in a barefoot procession for three miles before being placed in a grand new reliquary of gold, silver and rubies which Edgar had ordered to be made. He was also the greatest benefactor of Æthelwold's Abingdon Abbey.

Reformed Benedictine monasteries were mainly confined to Wessex and some areas of Mercia, and they were greatly outnumbered by the many secular minsters, although the reformed monasteries were much wealthier. The reformers portrayed Edgar's reign as a golden age which fundamentally changed the English church, but the historian John Blair is sceptical: "The polemic may belie a religious culture in Edgar's reign which, when we probe beneath the surface, starts to look less exclusive and more like that of Æthelstan's and Edmund's."

=== Learning and art ===
When Alfred came to the throne in 871, learning had declined to a low level and the knowledge of Latin was very poor. He started the revival of learning, and it was brought to its height by Edgar. Lapidge comments that his reign "marks a decisive turning-point in English literary history". No Latin works by Oswald are known, but Æthelwold and Dunstan were outstanding scholars. Æthelwold's translation of the Regula S. Benedicti is of the highest standard, and his New Minster Charter was written in elaborate hermeneutic Latin to display the dazzling erudition of the Benedictine movement and glorify King Edgar and the reform. Some of the works in Old English produced by Æthelwold are so lavishly and expensively produced that they cannot have been for the instruction of young oblates and were probably intended for nobles and royalty. There was also a great increase in Latin literature in Edgar's reign, all of it apparently associated with Æthelwold's Winchester. Much of this literature consisted of poetry, often containing many grecisms. The three leading reformers were strongly influenced by Continental scholarship and welcomed learned foreign clerics, such as Lantfred from Fleury Abbey, to their households. The art historian David Wilson states that Edgar's reign "produced some of the highest achievements in painting and sculpture ever seen in England". The Benedictional of St. Æthelwold is one of the greatest examples of English art. Several half-sisters of Edgar's father had married Continental royalty, and these connections helped Edgar to bring in foreign scholars such as Radbod and painters and goldsmiths such as Benna, who made metalwork for the king and decorated the ceiling of Wilton church.

=== Warfare and foreign relations ===
Peter Rex observes in his biography of Edgar that his reign was remarkable for the lack of opposition to his rule both from within and outside his kingdom. Although no Viking attacks on England are recorded in his reign, there were several battles fought by ealdormen and neighbouring kings. In 966, Thored, son of Gunnar, (Note: He may have been the Thored who became ealdorman of York by 979.) ravaged Westmorland, perhaps as part of English resistance to the southward expansion of Strathclyde, and King Kenneth of Scotland conducted raids on Northumbria in the early 970s. In the late 960s, there was dissension between the princes of the north Welsh Kingdom of Gwynedd, and in 967, the English under Ælfhere laid waste to it; in the early 970s, Anglesey was twice attacked by the Vikings. The Anglo-Saxon Chronicle boasted of the strength of Edgar's navy. ASC D and E, after declaring that many kings honoured Edgar, go on: "Nor was there fleet so proud nor host so strong that it got itself prey in England as long as the noble king held the throne." Later chroniclers made exaggerated claims, such as John of Worcester, who wrote that Edgar had 3,600 ships, and that he used to circumnavigate the island of Britain each summer, but there is evidence for naval organisation in the reign of his son Æthelred, and Edgar probably had a substantial fleet which laid the foundation for it.

A poem in the northern versions ASC D and E, which is thought on stylistic grounds to have been written by Wulfstan, praises Edgar, but then goes on "Yet he did one ill-deed too greatly: he loved evil foreign customs and brought too firmly heathen manners within this land, and attracted hither foreigners and enticed harmful people to this country." This probably refers to Edgar hiring Viking mercenaries and their ships, an expedient which was employed by Alfred and probably Æthelstan before Edgar, and Æthelred after him.

In 972/973, Edgar sent an embassy to the German emperor, Otto the Great. According to Byrhtferth:

Edgar sent some wonderful gifts to the emperor, through the agency of Abbot Æscwig and Wulfmær, his thegn; they brought back to him even more wonderful gifts, which served to establish a treaty of steadfast peace. The king was bountiful in his generosity, as befits a king. As a result of his abundant generosity, the kings of other peoples praised him exceedingly, and because he displayed the rage of a savage lion against his enemies, neighbouring kings and princes feared him.

=== The events of 973 ===
Naismith describes the year 973 as an annus mirabilis for the English kingdom. Edgar and Ælfryth were consecrated king and queen at Bath on Whit Sunday, 11 May 973. Kings were normally formally elected by their leading men and then crowned soon after their accession, but there is no record of Edgar being crowned early in his reign. The Anglo-Saxon Chronicle implies that it was a first coronation. ASC A, ASC B and ASC C say "Edmund's son, bold in battle, had spent 29 years in the world when this came about, and then in the thirtieth was consecrated king."; ASC D and ASC E describe him as "the ætheling Edgar". Historians debate whether it was a second coronation, and if not, the reason for the delay. One theory is that he waited until he was in his thirtieth year because thirty was the minimum age for consecration as a priest, but this has been questioned because at twenty-nine he was still too young. According to Nicholas, a twelfth-century prior of Worcester, Edgar postponed his consecration until he had outgrown the passions of his youth, and Stenton thinks that he may have waited "until he felt that he had come to full maturity of mind and conduct". Other historians, such as Janet Nelson, think that he was almost certainly crowned at the start of his reign. She argues that Edgar must have been crowned early in his reign because his legitimacy as king would otherwise have been impaired, and that the 973 consecration was intended to celebrate and display his claim to imperial status as overlord of Britain." The fact that it was recorded in verse in early versions of the Anglo-Saxon Chronicle (ASC A and B), whereas it was rare for the Chronicle to mention coronations at all, suggests that there was something special about this one. The German court was the leader in elaborate ritual and display, and the information learned by Edgar's embassy to Otto I may have played a major role in planning the coronation in Bath.

A northern version of the Chronicle dating to the second half of the eleventh or early twelfth centuries, ASC D, says that Edgar then sailed with his navy to Chester, where six kings promised to be his allies on land and sea. Ælfric of Eynsham, writing no more than twenty-five years later, apparently about the same event, says that "all the kings who were in this island, Cumbrians and Scots, came to Edgar, once eight kings on one day, and they all submitted to Edgar's direction". In the twelfth century, John of Worcester and William of Malmesbury gave accounts of the Chester meeting. They stated that the kings rowed Edgar on the River Dee as a symbol of their submission. Unlike earlier sources, they name the kings, and the historian of Wales Thomas Charles-Edwards gives their probable identities: Kenneth of Scotland, Dufnal and his son Malcolm of Strathclyde, Maccus, King of the Isles, Iacob and his nephew Hywel of Gwynedd, and two who are otherwise unknown, Siferth, who may have been a Viking, and Iuchil, perhaps a version of the Old Welsh name Iudhail. John of Worcester gives the fullest account, stating that the kings, who he calls underkings:

went to meet him, as he had commanded, and swore that they would be loyal to, and cooperate with, him by land and sea. With them, on a certain day, he boarded a skiff; having set them to the oars, and having taken the helm himself, he skilfully steered it through the course of the River Dee, and with a crowd of ealdormen and nobles following in a similar boat, sailed from the palace to the monastery of St John the Baptist, where, when he had prayed, he returned with the same pomp to the palace. As he was entering it he is reported to have declared to his nobles at length that each of his successors would be able to boast that he was king of the English, and would enjoy the pomp of such honour with so many kings at his command.

Some historians see the meeting as a parley between equals. The Chester meeting may have been a conference of kings following the English attacks on Wales and Scottish on England. Lothian had probably been under Scottish control since the 950s, and around this time Edgar formally ceded it to them. Kenneth may have attended the meeting to secure this concession and in Williams's view it is unlikely that he saw himself as Edgar's subordinate. The historian Christopher Lewis comments: "Precisely what happened at Chester has been irretrievably obscured by the embellishments of twelfth-century historians".

Other historians are more ready to accept claims of English superiority. Levi Roach and Richard Huscroft think that it makes better sense to see the events at Chester as a display of Edgar's overlordship. Molyneaux agrees, arguing that the English king was able to intimidate other rulers because he possessed far greater military strength: "If Edgar's neighbours wished to avoid their lands being ravaged, the invitation to Chester was probably not one that they could decline." Edgar claimed dominion over Britain by describing himself as ruler of "Britannia" and "Albion" in charters. Such claims, which are also found in the writings of the monastic reformers, are displayed in the titles of other tenth-century kings. They reached a peak during Edgar's reign, but in reality English power over the other nations of Britain was lower than at times earlier in the century. Scottish and Welsh kings sometimes attested Æthelstan's charters, but never those of Edgar. His coronation at Bath was only attended by English magnates, whereas at least two Welsh kings were present at that of Eadred in 946. After his reign, southern kings' hegemony over other parts of Britain weakened further, and there is no evidence of Scottish, Welsh or Cumbrian kings acknowledging English overlordship until 1031.

== Death and aftermath ==
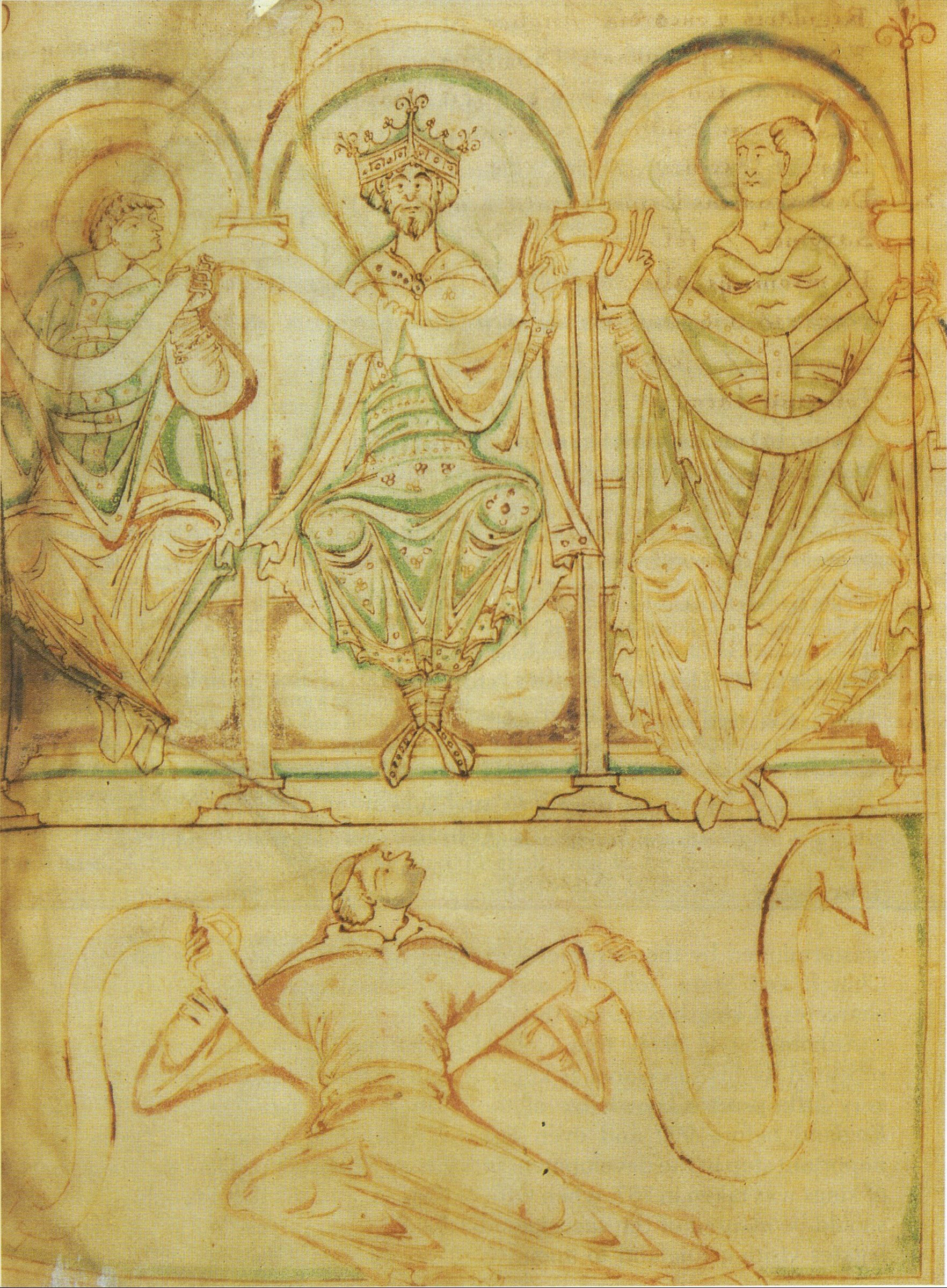
Edgar in the Regularis Concordia, flanked by two figures, probably Æthelwold and Dunstan, and all three holding the manuscript

Edgar was thirty-one or thirty-two years old when he died on 8 July 975. He was buried at Glastonbury Abbey, which was the burial place of his father and a monastery particularly associated with Dunstan and Benedictine reform. His burial at Glastonbury helped to make it a leading royal cult centre, although there is no evidence that he was revered as a saint earlier than the mid-eleventh century. The historian David Rollason comments that his cult had surprisingly little success in view of his role in monastic reform, "although presumably weakened by stories of his sexual adventures, notably with nuns". He is listed as a saint in some modern Catholic sources with a feast day of 8 July. Two of his children, Edith and Edward, were widely revered as saints shortly after their deaths.

The succession to the throne was disputed between the supporters of his two surviving sons. Æthelred had the powerful backing of his mother and her ally, Bishop Æthelwold, but Edgar's eldest son Edward became king with the support of Dunstan and Æthelwine. The dispute was personal, between the supporters of Edward and Æthelred, not between the supporters and opponents of monastic reform. The fact that there was no question of dividing the country between the two claimants may be a tribute to the success of Edgar's reforms aimed at unifying the country. Edward was murdered in 978; he was succeeded by Æthelred, whose disastrous reign ended with the Danish conquest of England.

== Assessment ==
The historian Judith Green describes Edgar's reign as "in many respects the apogee of Old English kingship", and Eric John comments that it "marks the high point in the history of the Anglo-Saxon state. One sign of this is, paradoxically, that we know little of secular events in Edgar's time. Violent incident was staple fare for annalists." Other historians also praise Edgar. Levi Roach sees his reign as "noteworthy for its stability, as both monastic reform and administrative developments served to provide a more secure basis for a unified kingdom. In the view of Martin Ryan: "By the end of the reign of King Edgar, Anglo-Saxon England possessed a sophisticated machinery of rule, capable of significant and, in medieval terms, precocious administrative feats." In Molyneaux's view, the mid-to late-tenth century was a crucial period for administrative development. However, it is uncertain how far Edgar was personally responsible: "This period, far more than the reigns of either Alfred or Æthelstan, was probably the most pivotal phase in the development of the institutional structures that were fundamental to royal rule in the eleventh century English kingdom". The fact that such a major change as his reform of the currency was not recorded until after the Conquest suggests that other important changes in his reign may have been wrongly attributed to the later time when they were first recorded.

Stenton's praise is more moderate. He describes Edgar's reign as "singularly devoid of recorded incident", which he attributes to Edgar's competence as a ruler, but he also writes that:

when Edgar is compared with other outstanding members of his house – with Alfred or with Æthelstan – he falls at once into a lower class than theirs. He was never required to defend English civilization against barbarians from over sea, nor to deal with the problems raised by the existence of barbarian states within England itself. His part in history was to maintain the peace established in England by earlier kings.

Some historians are more critical. Keynes comments: "It is a sign of Edgar's 'strength' as a ruler that when he died, on 8 July 975, the "peace" of his kingdom was immediately disturbed ... In general terms, the disturbances of Edward's reign should be regarded as a manifestation of the kind of social and political disorder which might be expected to attend the unexpected removal of one who was seen as the personification of an overbearing regime." His rule appears to have depended to a great degree on his personal control, which makes it understandable that his death should have created so many problems. Williams takes a similar view, and Snook argues that the infighting after his death and the disintegration of the state under his son Æthelred shows that the factionalism of the 950s had only been temporarily suppressed by Edgar. Commenting on the flattering portrait of Edgar by monastic writers, Stafford comments: "Sparse sources make the construction of any alternative to this plaster saint of monastic hagiography difficult."

Almost all of the Anglo-Saxon Chronicle is in prose, but three tenth-century kings are the subjects of panegyric poems. Two are about specific events, Æthelstan's victory at the Battle of Brunanburh in 937 and Edmund's recovery of the Five Boroughs of the Danelaw in 942, whereas three are general, all of them commemorating Edgar's reign. They are placed in the years of his accession, coronation and death, (Note: The historian Dorothy Whitelock comments on the poem commemorating Edgar's death that it is "of a quality to make one glad that the chroniclers mainly used prose".) and the historian Mercedes Salvador-Bello sees them as products of monastic reformers who celebrated him as a patron of their cause and compared him to Christ. After the troubles of the reigns of Edgar's sons, his rule came to be seen as a golden age, but his byname, Pacificus, is not recorded until the twelfth-century, in the chronicle of John of Worcester. Its translation as "Peaceful" is common in popular sources, but very rare in academic works on the period. (Note: In a sample of around thirty academic works on the period, none of them gave him the byname "Peaceful" in the index, and only one "Peaceable".) The historian Sean Miller argues that as Edgar was very ready to resort to violence, the term is better translated as "peacemaker", someone who preserved peace through "strict control backed up by military force rather than serenity of character".

== Sources ==
- Abels, Richard (1988). Lordship and Military Obligation in Anglo-Saxon England. Berkeley, California: University of California Press. ISBN 978-0-520-05794-4.
- Abels, Richard (2004). "Byrhtnoth [Brihtnoth] (d. 991)". Oxford Dictionary of National Biography. Oxford University Press. doi:10.1093/ref:odnb/3429. ISBN 978-0-19-861412-8. Archived from the original on 18 November 2022. (subscription, Wikipedia Library access or UK public library membership required)
- Barrow, Julia (2001). "Chester's Earliest Regatta? Edgar's Dee-rowing Revisited". Early Medieval Europe. 10 (1): 81–93. doi:10.1111/1468-0254.00080. ISSN 0963-9462. S2CID 161328357.
- Biggs, Frederick (2008). "Edgar's Path to the Throne". In Scragg, Donald (ed.). Edgar King of the English: New Interpretations. Woodbridge, UK: The Boydell Press. pp. 124–139. ISBN 978-1-84383-399-4.
- Blair, John (2005). The Church in Anglo-Saxon Society. Oxford, UK: Oxford University Press. ISBN 978-0-19-921117-3.
- Blunt, Christopher; Stewart, Ian; Lyon, Stewart (1989). Coinage in Tenth-Century England: From Edward the Elder to Edgar's Reform. Oxford, UK: Oxford University Press. ISBN 978-0-19-726060-9.
- Brooks, Nicholas (1984). The Early History of the Church of Canterbury. Leicester, UK: Leicester University Press. ISBN 978-0-7185-1182-1.
- Campbell, Alistair, ed. (1962). The Chronicle of Æthelweard (in Latin and English). London, UK: Thomas Nelson and Son Ltd. OCLC 245905467.
- Charles-Edwards, Thomas (2013). Wales and the Britons 350–1064. Oxford, UK: Oxford University Press. ISBN 978-0-19-821731-2.
- "Charter S 633". The Electronic Sawyer: Online Catalogue of Anglo-Saxon Charters. London, UK: King's College London. Archived from the original on 16 November 2022.
- "Charter S 667". The Electronic Sawyer: Online Catalogue of Anglo-Saxon Charters. London, UK: King's College London. Archived from the original on 16 November 2022.
- "Charter S 679". The Electronic Sawyer: Online Catalogue of Anglo-Saxon Charters. London, UK: King's College London. Archived from the original on 12 May 2024.
- "Charter S 690". The Electronic Sawyer: Online Catalogue of Anglo-Saxon Charters. London, UK: King's College London. Archived from the original on 3 January 2023.
- "Charter S 745". The Electronic Sawyer: Online Catalogue of Anglo-Saxon Charters. London, UK: King's College London. Archived from the original on 31 July 2022.
- "Charter S 806". The Electronic Sawyer: Online Catalogue of Anglo-Saxon Charters. London, UK: King's College London. Archived from the original on 29 September 2022.
- "Charter S 1211". The Electronic Sawyer: Online Catalogue of Anglo-Saxon Charters. London, UK: King's College London. Archived from the original on 3 January 2023.
- Coatsworth, Elizabeth (1988). "Late Pre-Conquest Sculptures with the Crucifixion South of the Humber". In Yorke, Barbara (ed.). Bishop Æthelwold: His Career and Influence. Woodbridge, UK: The Boydell Press. pp. 161–193. ISBN 978-0-85115-705-4.
- Cooper, Tracy-Anne (2015). Monk-Bishops and the English Benedictine Reform Movement. Toronto, Canada: Pontifical Institute of Mediaeval Studies. ISBN 978-0-88844-193-5.
- Crick, Julia (2008). "Edgar, Albion and Insular Dominion". In Scragg, Donald (ed.). Edgar King of the English, 595–975. Woodbridge, UK: The Boydell Press. pp. 158–170. ISBN 978-1-84383-928-6.
- Cubbin, G. P., ed. (1996). The Anglo-Saxon Chronicle, A Collaborative Edition, 6, MS D. Cambridge, UK: D. S. Brewer. ISBN 978-0-85991-467-3.
- Darlington, Reginald R.; McGurk, Patrick, eds. (1995). The Chronicle of John of Worcester (in Latin and English). Vol. 2. Oxford, UK: Clarendon Press. ISBN 978-0-19-822261-3.
- Fairweather, Janet, ed. (2005). Liber Eliensis: A History of the Isle of Ely from the Seventh Century to the Twelfth. Translated by Fairweather, Janet. Woodbridge, UK: The Boydell Press. ISBN 978-1-84383-015-3.
- Fisher, D. J. V. (1952). "The Anti-Monastic Reaction in the Reign of Edward the Martyr". Cambridge Historical Journal. 10 (3): 254–270. ISSN 0018-246X.
- Fleming, Robin (1991). Kings and Lords in Conquest England. Cambridge, UK: Cambridge University Press. ISBN 978-0-521-52694-4.
- Foot, Sarah (2000). Veiled Women. Vol. II. Aldershot, UK: Ashgate. ISBN 978-0-7546-0044-2.
- Foot, Sarah (2011). "Æthelstan (Athelstan) (893/4–939), king of England". Oxford Dictionary of National Biography. Oxford University Press. doi:10.1093/ref:odnb/833. Archived from the original on 14 June 2019.(subscription, Wikipedia Library access or UK public library membership required)
- Giles, J. A., ed. (1849). Roger of Wendover's Flowers of History. Vol. 1. London, UK: Henry G. Bohn. OCLC 633664910.
- Gransden, Antonia (1992). Legends, Traditions and History in Medieval England. London, UK: The Hambledon Press. ISBN 978-1-85285-016-6.
- Green, Judith (2017). Forging the Kingdom: Power in English Society 973–1189. Cambridge, UK: Cambridge University Press. ISBN 978-0-521-15829-9.
- Gretsch, Mechtild (1999). The Intellectual Foundations of the English Benedictine Reform. Cambridge, UK: Cambridge University Press. ISBN 978-0-521-03052-6.
- Hadley, Dawn (2000). The Northern Danelaw: Its Social Structure c. 800–1100. London, UK: Leicester University Press. ISBN 978-0-7185-0014-6.
- Harmer, Florence, ed. (1914). Select English Historical Documents of the Ninth and Tenth Centuries (in Latin and English). Cambridge, UK: Cambridge University Press. OCLC 1161790266.
- Hart, Cyril (1966). The Early Charters of Eastern England. Leicester, UK: Leicester University Press. OCLC 645356664.
- Hart, Cyril (1992). The Danelaw. London, UK: The Hambledon Press. ISBN 978-1-85285-044-9.
- Hart, Cyril (2005). "Æthelwine [Ethelwine, Æthelwine Dei Amicus] (d. 992)". Oxford Dictionary of National Biography. Oxford University Press. doi:10.1093/ref:odnb/8919. ISBN 978-0-19-861412-8. Archived from the original on 23 February 2022. (subscription, Wikipedia Library access or UK public library membership required)
- Hart, Cyril (2007). "Edward [St Edward; called Edward the Martyr] (c. 962–978)". Oxford Dictionary of National Biography. Oxford University Press. doi:10.1093/ref:odnb/8515. ISBN 978-0-19-861412-8. Archived from the original on 10 November 2021. (subscription, Wikipedia Library access or UK public library membership required)
- Hollis, Stephanie (2004). "Wilton as a Centre of Learning". In Hollis, Stephanie (ed.). Writing the Wilton Women: Goscelin's Legend of Edith and Liber Confortatorius. Turnhout, Belgium: Brepols. pp. 307–338. ISBN 978-2-503-51436-9.
- Howlett, David (2011). Dictionary of Medieval Latin from British Sources: Reg-Sal. Vol. XIV. Oxford, UK: Oxford University Press for the British Academy. ISBN 978-0-19-726508-6.
- Huscroft, Richard (2019). Making England 796–1042. Abingdon, UK: Routledge. ISBN 978-1-138-18246-2.
- Hutchinson, F. E. (1949). Medieval Glass at All Souls College. London, UK: Faber and Faber. OCLC 1269744.
- Insley, Charles (2012). "Charters, Ritual and Late Tenth-Century Kingship". In Nelson, Janet; Reynolds, Susan; Johns, Susan (eds.). Gender and Historiography: Studies in the Earlier Middle Ages in Honour of Pauline Stafford. London, UK: University of London Press: Institute of Historical Research. pp. 75–89. doi:10.14296/117.9771909646469. ISBN 978-1-905165-79-7.
- Jayakumar, Shashi (2001). "Some Reflections on the "Foreign Policies" of Edgar the Peaceable". Haskins Society Journal. 10: 17–37. ISSN 0963-4959.
- John, Eric (1966). Orbis Britanniae. Leicester, UK: Leicester University Press. OCLC 867807941.
- John, Eric (1982). "The Age of Edgar". In Campbell, James (ed.). The Anglo-Saxons. London, UK: Penguin Books. ISBN 978-0-14-014395-9.
- Karkov, Catherine (2004). The Ruler Portraits of Anglo-Saxon England. Woodbridge, UK: The Boydell Press. ISBN 978-1-84383-059-7.
- Karkov, Catherine (2008). "The frontispiece to the New Minster Charter and the King's Two Bodies". In Scragg, Donald (ed.). Edgar King of the English: New Interpretations. Woodbridge, UK: The Boydell Press. pp. 224–241. ISBN 978-1-84383-399-4.
- Kelly, Susan, ed. (1996). Charters of Shaftesbury Abbey. Anglo-Saxon Charters. Vol. 5. Oxford, UK: Oxford University Press for the British Academy. ISBN 978-0-19-726151-4.
- Kelly, Susan, ed. (2000). Charters of Abingdon Abbey Part 1. Anglo-Saxon Charters. Vol. 7. Oxford, UK: Oxford University Press for the British Academy. ISBN 978-0-19-726217-7.
- Kelly, Susan, ed. (2009). Charters of Peterborough Abbey. Anglo-Saxon Charters. Vol. 14. Oxford, UK: Oxford University Press for the British Academy. ISBN 978-0-19-726299-3.
- Keynes, Simon (1980). The Diplomas of King Æthelred the Unready 978–1016. Cambridge, UK: Cambridge University Press. ISBN 978-0-521-02308-5.
- Keynes, Simon; Lapidge, Michael, eds. (1983). Alfred the Great: Asser's Life of King Alfred & Other Contemporary Sources. London, UK: Penguin Classics. ISBN 978-0-14-044409-4.
- Keynes, Simon (1985). "King Æthelstan's books". In Lapidge, Michael; Gneuss, Helmut (eds.). Learning and Literature in Anglo-Saxon England. Cambridge, UK: Cambridge University Press. pp. 143–201. ISBN 978-0-521-25902-6.
- Keynes, Simon (1994). "The 'Dunstan B' Charters". Anglo-Saxon England. 23: 165–193. doi:10.1017/S026367510000452X. ISSN 0263-6751. S2CID 161883384.
- Keynes, Simon (1999). "England, c. 900–1016". In Reuter, Timothy (ed.). The New Cambridge Medieval History. Vol. III. Cambridge, UK: Cambridge University Press. pp. 456–484. ISBN 978-0-521-36447-8.
- Keynes, Simon (2002). An Atlas of Attestations in Anglo-Saxon Charters, c. 670–1066. Cambridge, UK: Dept. of Anglo-Saxon, Norse, and Celtic, University of Cambridge, UK. ISBN 978-0-9532697-6-1. Archived from the original on 29 July 2022.
- Keynes, Simon (2003a). "Introduction". An Introduction to Anglo-Saxon England by Peter Hunter Blair with a New Introduction by Simon Keynes (3rd ed.). Cambridge, UK: Cambridge University Press. pp. xi–xxxv. ISBN 978-0-521-83085-0.
- Keynes, Simon (2003b). "Ely Abbey 672–1109". In Meadows, Peter; Ramsay, Nigel (eds.). A History of Ely Cathedral. Woodbridge, UK: The Boydell Press. pp. 3–58. ISBN 978-0-85115-945-4.
- Keynes, Simon (2004). "Eadwig [Edwy] (c. 940–959)". Oxford Dictionary of National Biography. Oxford University Press. doi:10.1093/ref:odnb/8572. ISBN 978-0-19-861412-8. Archived from the original on 7 May 2021. (subscription, Wikipedia Library access or UK public library membership required)
- Keynes, Simon (2008a). "Edgar rex admirabilis". In Scragg, Donald (ed.). Edgar King of the English: New Interpretations. Woodbridge, UK: The Boydell Press. pp. 3–58. ISBN 978-1-84383-399-4.
- Keynes, Simon (2008b). "A Conspectus of the Charters of King Edgar 957–975". In Scragg, Donald (ed.). Edgar King of the English: New Interpretations. Woodbridge, UK: The Boydell Press. pp. 60–80. ISBN 978-1-84383-399-4.
- Keynes, Simon (2013). "Church Councils, Royal Assemblies and Anglo-Saxon Royal Diplomas". In Owen-Crocker, Gale; Schneider, Brian (eds.). Kingship, Legislation and Power in Anglo-Saxon England. Woodbridge, UK: The Boydell Press. pp. 17–182. ISBN 978-1-84383-877-7.
- Lapidge, Michael (1988). "Æthelwold as Scholar and Teacher". In Yorke, Barbara (ed.). Bishop Æthelwold: His Career and Influence. Woodbridge, UK: The Boydell Press. pp. 89–117. ISBN 978-0-85115-705-4.
- Lapidge, Michael (1993). Anglo-Latin Literature 900–1066. London, UK: The Hambledon Press. ISBN 978-1-85285-012-8.
- Lapidge, Michael (2003). The Cult of St Swithun. Oxford, UK: Oxford University Press. ISBN 978-0-19-813183-0.
- Lapidge, Michael, ed. (2009). Byrhtferth of Ramsey: The Lives of St Oswald and St Ecgwine (in Latin and English). Oxford, UK: Clarendon Press. ISBN 978-0-19-955078-4.
- Lavelle, Ryan (2008). Aethelred II: King of the English (2nd ed.). Stroud, UK: The History Press. ISBN 978-0-7524-4678-3.
- Lawson, M. K. (2011). Cnut: England's Viking King 1016–35. Stroud, UK: The History Press. ISBN 978-0-7524-6069-7.
- Leonardi, Claudio (1999). "Intellectual Life". In Reuter, Timothy (ed.). The New Cambridge Medieval History. Vol. III. Cambridge, UK: Cambridge University Press. pp. 186–211. ISBN 978-0-521-36447-8.
- Lewis, C. P. (2008). "Edgar, Chester and the Kingdom of the Mercians, 957–9". In Scragg, Donald (ed.). Edgar King of the English: New Interpretations. Woodbridge, UK: The Boydell Press. pp. 104–123. ISBN 978-1-84383-399-4.
- Marafioti, Nicole (2014). The King's Body: Burial and Succession in Late Anglo-Saxon England. Toronto, Canada: University of Toronto Press. ISBN 978-1-4426-4758-9.
- Miller, Sean, ed. (2001). Charters of the New Minster, Winchester. Anglo-Saxon Charters. Oxford, UK: Oxford University Press for the British Academy. ISBN 978-0-19-726223-8.
- Miller, Sean (2011). "Edward [called Edward the Elder] (870s?–924), king of the Anglo-Saxons". Oxford Dictionary of National Biography. Oxford University Press. doi:10.1093/ref:odnb/8514. Archived from the original on 25 September 2019. (subscription, Wikipedia Library access or UK public library membership required)
- Miller, Sean (2014a). "Eadwig". In Lapidge, Michael; Blair, John; Keynes, Simon; Scragg, Donald (eds.). The Wiley Blackwell Encyclopedia of Anglo-Saxon England (2nd ed.). Chichester, UK: Wiley Blackwell. pp. 155–156. ISBN 978-0-470-65632-7.
- Miller, Sean (2014b). "Edgar". In Lapidge, Michael; Blair, John; Keynes, Simon; Scragg, Donald (eds.). The Wiley Blackwell Encyclopedia of Anglo-Saxon England (2nd ed.). Chichester, UK: Wiley Blackwell. pp. 163–164. ISBN 978-0-470-65632-7.
- Molyneaux, George (2011). "Why were some Tenth Century English Kings Presented as Rulers of Britain?". Transactions of the Royal Historical Society. 21: 59–91. doi:10.1017/S0080440111000041. ISSN 0080-4401. S2CID 162293967.
- Molyneaux, George (2015). The Formation of the English Kingdom in the Tenth Century. Oxford, UK: Oxford University Press. ISBN 978-0-19-871791-1.
- Mynors, Roger A. B.; Thomson, Rodney M.; Winterbottom, Michael, eds. (1998). William of Malmesbury: Gesta Regum Anglorum, The History of the English Kings (in Latin and English). Vol. I. Oxford, UK: Clarendon Press. ISBN 978-0-19-820678-1.
- Naismith, Rory (2014a). "Money". In Lapidge, Michael; Blair, John; Keynes, Simon; Scragg, Donald (eds.). The Wiley Blackwell Encyclopedia of Anglo-Saxon England (2nd ed.). Chichester, UK: Blackwell Publishing. pp. 329–330. ISBN 978-0-470-65632-7.
- Naismith, Rory (2014b). "Prelude to Reform: Tenth-Century English Coinage in Perspective". In Naismith, Rory; Allen, Martin; Screen, Elina (eds.). Early Medieval Monetary History: Studies in Memory of Mark Blackburn. Abingdon, UK: Routledge. pp. 39–83. ISBN 978-0-367-59999-7.
- Naismith, Rory (2017). Britain and Ireland c. 400–1066. Medieval European Coinage: with a Catalogue of the Coins in the Fitzwilliam Museum, Cambridge. Vol. 8. Cambridge, UK: Cambridge University Press. ISBN 978-0-521-26016-9.
- Naismith, Rory (2021). Early Medieval Britain, c. 500–1000. Cambridge, UK: Cambridge University Press. ISBN 978-1-108-44025-7.
- Nelson, Janet (1977). "Inauguration Rituals". In Sawyer, P. H.; Wood, I. N. (eds.). Early Medieval Kingship. Leeds, UK: School of History, University of Leeds. pp. 50–71. ISBN 978-0-906200-00-1.
- Nelson, Janet L. (1999). "Rulers and Government". In Reuter, Timothy (ed.). The New Cambridge Medieval History: Volume III c. 900–1024. Cambridge, UK: Cambridge University Press. pp. 95–129. ISBN 978-0-521-36447-8.
- Ortenberg, Veronica (2002). The English Church and the Continent. Oxford, UK: Clarendon Press. ISBN 978-0-19-820159-5.
- Owen-Crocker, Gale; Schneider, Brian, eds. (2013). Kingship, Legislation and Power in Anglo-Saxon England. Woodbridge, UK: The Boydell Press. ISBN 978-1-84383-877-7.
- Rex, Peter (2007). Edgar, King of the English 959–975. Stroud, UK: Tempus Publishing Limited. ISBN 978-0-7524-4124-5.
- Ridyard, Susan (1988). The Royal Saints of Anglo-Saxon England. Cambridge, UK: Cambridge University Press. ISBN 978-0-521-30772-7.
- Roach, Levi (2013). Kingship and Consent in Anglo-Saxon England, 871–978. Cambridge, UK: Cambridge University Press. ISBN 978-1-107-03653-6.
- Roach, Levi (2016). Æthelred the Unready. New Haven, Connecticut: Yale University Press. ISBN 978-0-300-22972-1.
- Robertson, Agnes, ed. (1925). The Laws of the Kings of England from Edmund to Henry I. Cambridge, UK: Cambridge University Press. OCLC 271025606.
- Robertson, Agnes, ed. (1956). Anglo-Saxon Charters (2nd ed.). Cambridge, UK: Cambridge University Press. OCLC 504288415.
- Rollason, David (1989). Saints and Relics in Anglo-Saxon England. Oxford, UK: Basil Blackwell Ltd. ISBN 978-0-631-16506-4.
- Rumble, Alexander (2002). Property and Piety in Early Medieval Winchester: Documents Relating to the Topography of the Anglo-Saxon and Norman City and its Minster. Oxford, UK: Clarendon Press. ISBN 978-0-19-813413-8.
- Rumble, Alexander (2008). "The Laity and the Monastic Reform in the Reign of Edgar". In Scragg, Donald (ed.). Edgar King of the English: New Interpretations. Woodbridge, UK: The Boydell Press. pp. 242–251. ISBN 978-1-84383-399-4.
- Ryan, Martin J. (2013). "Conquest, Reform and the Making of England". In Higham, Nicholas J.; Ryan, Martin J. (eds.). The Anglo-Saxon World. New Haven, Connecticut: Yale University Press. pp. 284–334. ISBN 978-0-300-12534-4.
- Salvador-Bello, Mercedes (2008). "The Edgar Panegyrics in the Anglo-Saxon Chronicle". In Scragg, Donald (ed.). Edgar King of the English, 595–975. Woodbridge, UK: The Boydell Press. pp. 252–272. ISBN 978-1-84383-928-6.
- Smyth, Alfred P. (1984). Warlords and Holy Men: Scotland AD 80–1000. London, UK: Edward Arnold. ISBN 978-0-7131-6305-6.
- Snook, Ben (2015). The Anglo-Saxon Chancery: The History, Language and Production of Anglo-Saxon Charters from Alfred to Edgar. Woodbridge, UK: The Boydell Press. ISBN 978-1-78327-006-4.
- Stafford, Pauline (1981). "The King's Wife in Wessex 800–1066". Past and Present (91): 3–27. doi:10.1093/past/91.1.3. ISSN 0031-2746.
- Stafford, Pauline (1989). Unification and Conquest. A Political and Social History of England in the Tenth and Eleventh Centuries. London, UK: Edward Arnold. ISBN 978-0-7131-6532-6.
- Stafford, Pauline (2001). Queen Emma and Queen Edith (paperback ed.). Oxford, UK: Blackwell. ISBN 978-0-631-16679-5.
- Stafford, Pauline (2004a). "Eadgifu". Oxford Dictionary of National Biography. Oxford University Press. doi:10.1093/ref:odnb/52307. ISBN 978-0-19-861412-8. Archived from the original on 16 November 2022. (subscription, Wikipedia Library access or UK public library membership required)
- Stafford, Pauline (2004b). "Ælfthryth (d. 999x1001)". Oxford Dictionary of National Biography. Oxford University Press. doi:10.1093/ref:odnb/194. ISBN 978-0-19-861412-8. Archived from the original on 7 March 2022. (subscription, Wikipedia Library access or UK public library membership required)
- Stafford, Pauline (2014). "Ealdorman". In Lapidge, Michael; Blair, John; Keynes, Simon; Scragg, Donald (eds.). The Wiley Blackwell Encyclopedia of Anglo-Saxon England (2nd ed.). Chichester, UK: Wiley Blackwell. pp. 156–157. ISBN 978-0-470-65632-7.
- Stenton, Frank (1971). Anglo-Saxon England (3rd ed.). Oxford, UK: Oxford University Press. ISBN 978-0-19-280139-5.
- Swanton, Michael, ed. (2000) [1st edition 1996]. The Anglo-Saxon Chronicles (revised paperback ed.). London, UK: Phoenix. ISBN 978-1-84212-003-3.
- Symons, Thomas (1975). "Regularis Concordia: History and Derivation". In Parsons, David (ed.). Tenth Century Studies: Essays in Commemoration of the Millennium of the Council of Winchester and Regularis Concordia. London, UK: Phillimore. pp. 37–59. ISBN 978-0-85033-179-0.
- Thacker, Alan (1988). "Æthelwold and Abingdon". In Yorke, Barbara (ed.). Bishop Æthelwold: His Career and Influence. Woodbridge, UK: The Boydell Press. pp. 43–64. ISBN 978-0-85115-705-4.
- Thacker, Alan (1992). "Cults at Canterbury: Relics and Reform under Dunstan and his Successors". In Ramsay, Nigel; Sparks, Margaret; Tatton-Brown, Tim (eds.). St Dunstan: His Life, Times and Cult. Woodbridge, UK: The Boydell Press. pp. 221–245. ISBN 978-0-85115-301-8.
- Thomson, Rodney M.; Winterbottom, Michael, eds. (1999). William of Malmesbury: Gesta Regum Anglorum, The History of the English Kings. Vol. II. Oxford, UK: Clarendon Press. ISBN 978-0-19-820682-8.
- Trousdale, Alaric (2013). "Being Everywhere at Once: Delegation and Royal Authority in Late Anglo-Saxon England". In Owen-Crocker, Gale; Schneider, Brian (eds.). Kingship, Legislation and Power in Anglo-Saxon England. Woodbridge, UK: The Boydell Press. pp. 275–296. ISBN 978-1-84383-877-7.
- Whitelock, Dorothy (1959). "The Dealings of the Kings of England with Northumbria in the Tenth and Eleventh Centuries". In Clemoes, Peter (ed.). Anglo-Saxons: Studies in some Aspects of their History and Culture presented to Bruce Dickins. London, UK: Bowes and Bowes. pp. 70–88. OCLC 1062985443.
- Whitelock, Dorothy, ed. (1979). English Historical Documents, Volume 1, c. 500–1042 (2nd ed.). London, UK: Routledge. ISBN 978-0-415-14366-0.
- Whitelock, Dorothy; Brett, Martin; Brooke, Christopher, eds. (1981). Councils & Synods with other Documents Relating to the English Church, Part I 871–1066. Oxford, UK: Oxford University Press. ISBN 978-0-19-822394-8.
- Wickham, Chris (2009). "Problems in doing Comparative History". In Skinner, Patricia (ed.). Challenging the Boundaries of Medieval History: The Legacy of Timothy Reuter. Turnhout, Belgium: Brepols. pp. 5–28. ISBN 978-2-503-52359-0.
- Williams, Ann (1982). "Princeps Merciorum Gentis: the Family, Career and Connections of Ælfhere, Ealdorman of Mercia". Anglo-Saxon England. 10: 143–172. doi:10.1017/S0263675100003240. ISSN 0263-6751.
- Williams, Ann (1999). Kingship and Government in Pre-Conquest England, c. 500–1066. Basingstoke, UK: Macmillan Press Ltd. ISBN 978-0-312-22090-7.
- Williams, Ann (2003). Æthelred the Unready: The Ill-Counselled King. London, UK: Hambledon and London. ISBN 978-1-85285-382-2.
- Williams, Ann (2004a). "Edmund I (920/21–946)". Oxford Dictionary of National Biography. Oxford University Press. doi:10.1093/ref:odnb/8501. ISBN 978-0-19-861412-8. Archived from the original on 25 November 2021. (subscription, Wikipedia Library access or UK public library membership required)
- Williams, Ann (2004b). "Eadred [Edred] (d. 955)". Oxford Dictionary of National Biography. Oxford University Press. doi:10.1093/ref:odnb/8510. ISBN 978-0-19-861412-8. Archived from the original on 8 September 2021. (subscription, Wikipedia Library access or UK public library membership required)
- Williams, Ann (2004c). "Ælfhere (d. 983)". Oxford Dictionary of National Biography. Oxford University Press. doi:10.1093/ref:odnb/182. ISBN 978-0-19-861412-8. Archived from the original on 16 November 2022. (subscription, Wikipedia Library access or UK public library membership required)
- Williams, Ann (2014). "Edgar (called Edgar Pacificus) (943/4–975)". Oxford Dictionary of National Biography. Oxford University Press. doi:10.1093/ref:odnb/8463. Archived from the original on 22 January 2020.(subscription, Wikipedia Library access or UK public library membership required)
- Wilson, David (1984). Anglo-Saxon Art from the Seventh Century to the Norman Conquest. London, UK: Thames and Hudson. ISBN 978-0-500-23392-4.
- Winterbottom, Michael, ed. (2007). William of Malmesbury: Gesta Pontificum Anglorum, The History of the English Bishops (in Latin and English). Vol. 1. Oxford, UK: Clarendon Press. ISBN 978-0-19-820770-2.
- Winterbottom, Michael; Lapidge, Michael, eds. (2011). The Early Lives of St Dunstan (in Latin and English). Oxford, UK: Oxford University Press. ISBN 978-0-19-960504-0.
- Wollasch, Joachim (1999). "Monasticism: the First Wave of Reform". In Reuter, Timothy (ed.). The New Cambridge Medieval History: Volume III c. 900-1024. Cambridge, UK: Cambridge University Press. pp. 163–185. ISBN 978-0-521-36447-8.
- Woodman, David, ed. (2012). Charters of Northern Houses. Anglo-Saxon Charters. Vol. 16. Oxford, UK: Oxford University Press for the British Academy. ISBN 978-0-19-726529-1.
- Wormald, Patrick (1988). "Æthelwold and his Continental Counterparts: Contact, Comparison, Contrast". In Yorke, Barbara (ed.). Bishop Æthelwold: His Career and Influence. Woodbridge, UK: The Boydell Press. pp. 13–42. ISBN 978-0-85115-705-4.
- Wormald, Patrick (1999). The Making of English Law: King Alfred to the Twelfth Century. Vol. 1. Oxford, UK: Blackwell. ISBN 978-0-631-13496-1.
- Yorke, Barbara (1988a). "Introduction". In Yorke, Barbara (ed.). Bishop Æthelwold: His Career and Influence. Woodbridge, UK: The Boydell Press. pp. 10–12. ISBN 978-0-85115-705-4.
- Yorke, Barbara (1988b). "Æthelwold and the Politics of the Tenth Century". In Yorke, Barbara (ed.). Bishop Æthelwold: His Career and Influence. Woodbridge, UK: The Boydell Press. pp. 65–88. ISBN 978-0-85115-705-4.
- Yorke, Barbara (1995). Wessex in the Early Middle Ages. London, UK: Leicester University Press. ISBN 978-0-7185-1856-1.
- Yorke, Barbara (2003). "The Legitimacy of St Edith". Haskins Society Journal. 11: 97–113. ISSN 0963-4959.
- Yorke, Barbara (2004a). "Wulfthryth (St Wulfthryth) (d. c. 1000), abbess of Wilton". Oxford Dictionary of National Biography. Oxford University Press. doi:10.1093/ref:odnb/49423. ISBN 978-0-19-861412-8. Archived from the original on 3 July 2022. (subscription, Wikipedia Library access or UK public library membership required)
- Yorke, Barbara (2004b). "Edith [St Edith, Eadgyth] (961x4–984x7)". Oxford Dictionary of National Biography. Oxford University Press. doi:10.1093/ref:odnb/8482. ISBN 978-0-19-861412-8. Archived from the original on 2 September 2022. (subscription, Wikipedia Library access or UK public library membership required)
- Yorke, Barbara (2004c). "Wulfhild [St Wulfhild] (d. after 996)". Oxford Dictionary of National Biography. Oxford University Press. doi:10.1093/ref:odnb/49417. ISBN 978-0-19-861412-8. Archived from the original on 13 October 2022. (subscription, Wikipedia Library access or UK public library membership required)
- Yorke, Barbara (2004d). "Æthelwold (St Æthelwold, Ethelwold) (904x9–984)". Oxford Dictionary of National Biography. Oxford University Press. doi:10.1093/ref:odnb/8920. Archived from the original on 12 May 2024. (subscription, Wikipedia Library access or UK public library membership required)
- Yorke, Barbara (2008). "The Women in Edgar's Life". In Scragg, Donald (ed.). Edgar King of the English, 595-975. Woodbridge, UK: The Boydell Press. pp. 143–157. ISBN 978-1-84383-928-6.
- Yorke, Barbara (2013). "The Burial of Kings in Anglo-Saxon England". In Owen-Crocker, Gale; Schneider, Brian (eds.). Kingship, Legislation and Power in Anglo-Saxon England. Woodbridge, UK: The Boydell Press. pp. 237–257. ISBN 978-1-84383-877-7.

Edgar, King of England House of Wessex Born: c. 944 Died: 8 July 975
Regnal titles
Preceded by Eadwig	King of the English; 959–975	Succeeded by Edward the Martyr
