= Oslac of York =

Earl of York (fl. 963–975)

Oslac ealdorman (or earl) of York from around 963 to 975. His territory included but may not have been limited to the southern half of Northumbria. His background is obscure because of poor source documentation. The latter has facilitated disagreement amongst historians regarding his family and ethnicity.

He may have been an ealdorman of southern—as opposed to a united—Northumbria, though an alternative tradition puts the division of Northumbria into two ealdormanries after his death. Little is known of his career as ealdorman, except for a legend that he escorted the Scottish king Kenneth II to the English royal court, and that he was expelled from England in 975. His life is unattested after this. He had one known son, but it is not clear if that son ever succeeded him.

== Origins ==
Oslac's origins are unclear and no specific relationship with any previous known figure can be established from available sources. Oslac's name suggests to some historians that he was a Norseman. Dorothy Whitelock points out that the name Oslac is often an anglicisation of the Old Scandinavian name Áslákr, while Ann Williams comments that the name suggests an origin in the Danelaw, a suggestion supported by the fact that Thored, Oslac's son, held lands in Cambridgeshire.

On the other hand Oslac is also a genuine English name, and the common Os element Oslac's name shared with the name of Osulf of Bamburgh, previous ealdorman of York, points to a connection with the Bamburgh family of the English far north.

== Accession ==
Oslac attested three charters as earl in 963, all relating to the northern Danelaw. He may have acceded on the death or deposition of his predecessor Osulf. Some of these charters are problematic as source documents, having been recorded only in later cartularlies; there is thus a possibility of interference in their transmission. Moreover, a charter dated 966 of a grant by dux Thored is witnessed by Oslac minister (i.e. "thegn"), suggesting that Oslac had not acceded to the ealdormanship of York before 966. Some historians think that Oslac became the "senior ealdorman of all Northumbria, including the territory of the high-reeves of Bamburgh."

== Division of Northumbria ==
De primo Saxonum adventu, an 11th- or 12th-century compilation from earlier sources, claims that after the death of Osulf Northumbria was divided into two parts: Eadulf Evil-child receiving the lands between the Firth of Forth and the River Tees and Oslac receiving the lands between the Humber Estuary and the Tees.

According to John of Wallingford, King Edgar made this division during a council at York, in order to prevent the whole area becoming the inheritance of one man. The Historia Regum claims that such a division took place not in Oslac's time but Osulf's, and that the division line was the River Tyne rather than Tees; historian Dorothy Whitelock considered this to be apocryphal.

== Career ==
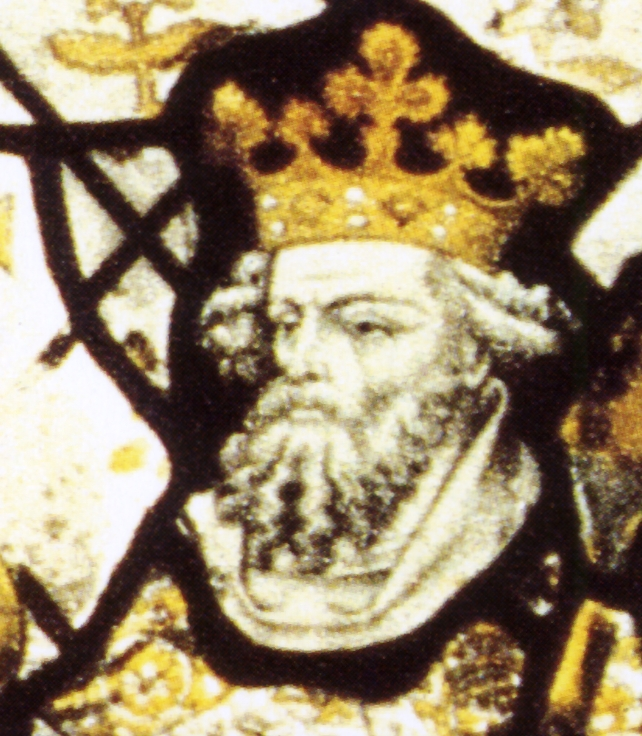
King Edgar of England, Oslac's lord and patron

Oslac frequently attested charters of King Edgar (reigned 959-975), indicating that Oslac enjoyed some position of trust at court.

De primo Saxonum adventu claims that Oslac, along with Eadulf of Bamburgh and Ælfsige Bishop of Chester-le-Street, escorted the Scottish king Kenneth II to the Wessex-based Edgar:

The two earls [Oslac and Eadwulf] along with Ælfsige, who was bishop of St Cuthbert [968—90], conducted Cinaed to king Edgar. And when he had done homage to him, king Edgar gave him Lothian; and with great honour sent him back to his own.

This must have occurred — if it happened at all — between 968 and 975, i.e. between Ælfsige becoming bishop and Edgar dying. Richard Fletcher dated it to 973.

The historian Geoffrey Barrow believed this to mark the beginning of Scottish control over all the lands between the River Tweed and Firth of Forth (defining "Lothian" in this manner), though another historian, Alex Woolf, has suggested that the part about Lothian may have been fabricated later to give credence to the claim that the Scottish kings owed homage for lands in Lothian.

== Downfall and legacy ==
In 975, not long after the death of King Edgar, Oslac was banished from England. Manuscript C of the Anglo-Saxon Chronicle describes the events:

And then also the valiant man Oslac was driven from the country, over the tossing waves, the gannet's bath, the tumult of the waters, the homeland of the whale; a grey-haired man, wise and skilled in speech, he was bereft of his lands.

The historian Richard Fletcher guesses that Oslac's downfall may have been the result of opposing the succession of Edward the Martyr.

Oslac is said by the Historia Eliensis to have had a son named Thorth, that is, Thored. His successor was indeed a man named Thored, but it is not clear whether this was Thored Oslac's son or Thored son of Gunnar; historians tend to favour the idea that Thored the successor was son of Gunnar.

== Sources ==
- Anderson, Alan Orr, ed. (1991) [1908]. Scottish Annals from English Chroniclers A.D. 500 to 1286 (revised ed.). Stamford: Paul Watkins. ISBN 1-871615-45-3.
- Arnold, Thomas, ed. (1885). Symeonis Monachi Opera Omnia. Rerum Britannicarum Medii Ævi Scriptores, or, Chronicles and Memorials of Great Britain and Ireland during the Middle Ages. Vol. 2. London: Longman. OCLC 502586298.
- Barrow, Geoffrey (1966). "The Anglo-Scottish Borde". Northern History. 1 (1): 21–42.
- Fletcher, Richard (2003), Bloodfeud: Murder and Revenge in Anglo-Saxon England, London: Penguin Books, ISBN 0-14-028692-6
- Hart, Cyril (2004). "Oslac (fl. 963–975)". Oxford Dictionary of National Biography. Oxford University Press. doi:10.1093/ref:odnb/20898. (subscription, Wikipedia Library access or UK public library membership required)
- Rollason, David (2003), Northumbria, 500—1100: Creation and Destruction of a Kingdom, Cambridge: Cambridge University Press, ISBN 0-521-04102-3
- Whitelock, Dorothy (1959). "The Dealings of the Kings of England with Northumbria in the Tenth and Eleventh Centuries". In Clemoes, Peter (ed.). Anglo-Saxons: Studies in some Aspects of their History and Culture presented to Bruce Dickins. London, UK: Bowes and Bowes. pp. 70–88. OCLC 1062985443.
- Whitelock, Dorothy; Douglas, David; Tucker, Susie, eds. (1961). The Anglo-Saxon Chronicle. London, UK: Eyre and Spottiswoode. OCLC 317315404.
- Williams, Ann (1991a). "Oslac ealdorman 963-75". In Williams, Ann; Smyth, Alfred P.; Kirby, D. P. (eds.). A Biographical Dictionary of Dark Age Britain. London, UK: Seaby. p. 194. ISBN 978-1-85264-047-7.
- Williams, Ann (1991b). "Thored ealdorman 979-92". In Williams, Ann; Smyth, Alfred P.; Kirby, D. P. (eds.). A Biographical Dictionary of Dark Age Britain. London, UK: Seaby. p. 223. ISBN 978-1-85264-047-7.
- Woolf, Alex (2007). From Pictland to Alba, 789–1070. The New Edinburgh History of Scotland. Edinburgh: Edinburgh University Press. ISBN 978-0-7486-1234-5.

Regnal titles
Preceded by Osulf of Bamburgh	Ealdorman of York c. 966–975	Succeeded by Thored
