= William E. Kapelle =

American historian

William E. Kapelle (born in Baldwin City, Kansas) is a medieval historian at Brandeis University in Waltham, Massachusetts. He received his B.A at the University of Kansas in 1965, and his M.A. in 1970. Kapelle received his doctorate at the University of Massachusetts - Amherst, and has taught at Brandeis University for more than twenty years. He won the Herbert Baxter Adams Prize in 1980 for his first monograph, The Norman Conquest of the North: The Region and Its Transformation, 1000-1135.

Kapelle is noted for the argument, among others, that the North of England was not really brought under Norman control until the reign of Henry I.

== Selected works ==
- The Norman Conquest of the North: The Region and Its Transformation, 1000-1135 (University of North Carolina Press, 1980), ISBN 0-8078-1371-0.
- The Purpose of Domesday Book: a Quandary
- Domesday Book: F. W. Maitland and His Successors (1989)
