= Oswulf I of Bamburgh =

High-reeve of Bamburgh (fl. c. 946–954)

Oswulf
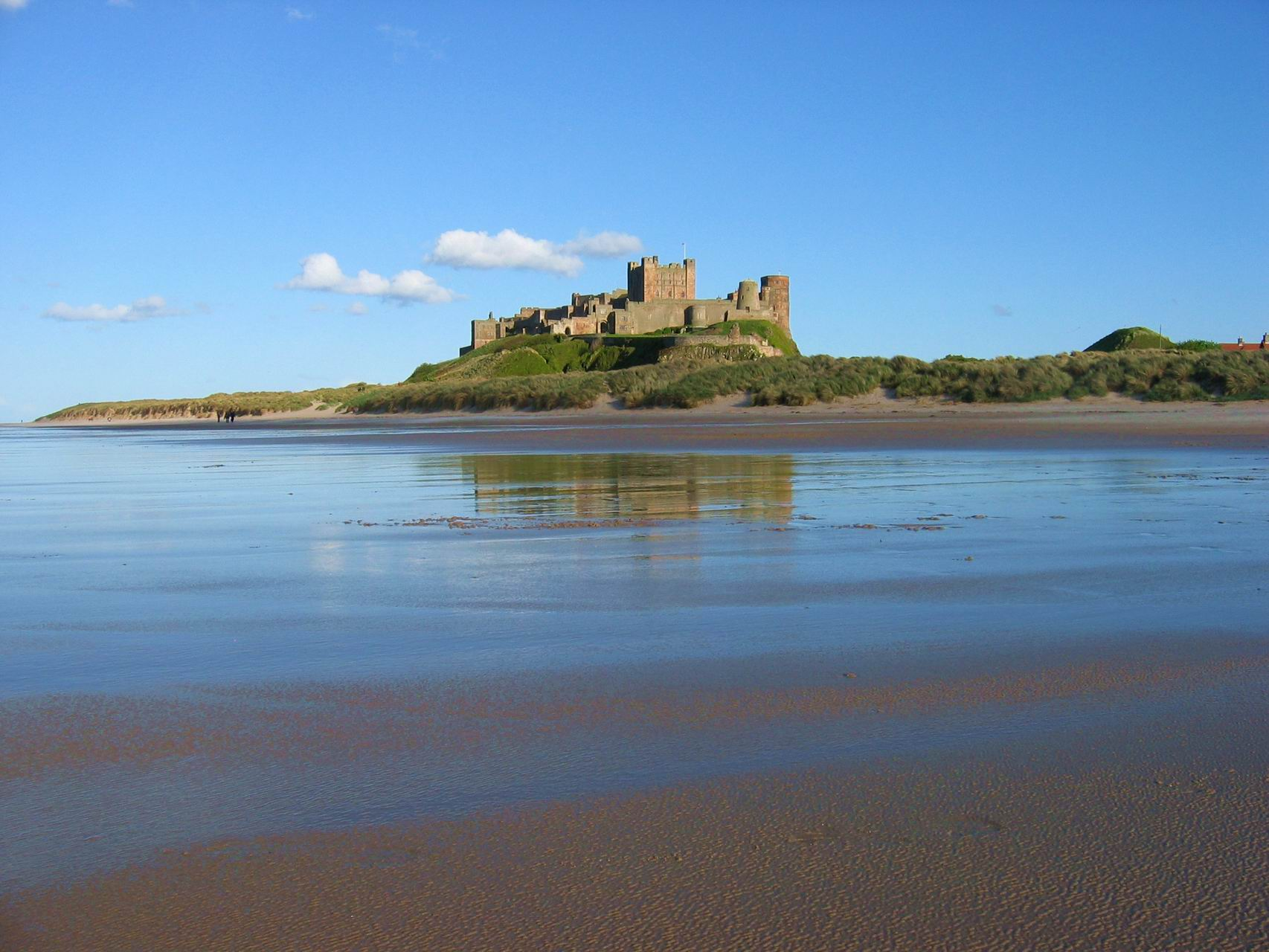
- The peninsula of Bamburgh, with the modern castle
- Died: between 954 and 963
- Known for: Betraying Eric of York and being the first recorded High-Reeve of Bamburgh
- Title: High-Reeve of Bamburgh, Ealdorman of York
- Father: Eadwulf I of Bamburgh

Oswulf (fl. c. 946 to after 954) was ruler of Bamburgh and subsequently, according to later tradition, commander of all Northumbria under the lordship of King Eadred of England. He is sometimes called "earl" or "high reeve", though the precise title of the rulers of Bamburgh is unclear. By the twelfth century Oswulf was held responsible for the death of Northumbria's last Norse king, Eric of York, subsequently administering the Kingdom of York on behalf of Eadred.

== Identity ==
Only elements of Oswulf's origin are accounted for. A genealogy in the text De Northumbria post Britannos, recording the ancestry of Waltheof Earl of Northampton (and, briefly, Northumbria), says that Oswulf was the son of Eadwulf I of Bamburgh, the "King of the Northern English" who died in 913. There has also been modern speculation that he was son of Ealdred I of Bamburgh, and thus grandson of Eadwulf I. Richard Fletcher and David Rollason thought he might be the Oswulf Dux who had witnessed charters further south in the 930s, which if true would extend Oswulf's floruit back to 934.

He is the first man specifically designated "high-reeve" of Bamburgh. High-reeve is Old English heah-gerefa, and Alfred Smyth thought the style was influenced by the Scottish word mormaer, which possibly has the same meaning (lit. 'high steward'). Judging by the North People's Law, a high-reeve was not the same as an ealdorman (dux), having only half an ealdorman's wergild.

Oswulf is listed as an attester to four charters of King Eadred, one dated 946, two in 949 and one of 950. These are all "alliterative charters", which have much fuller witness lists than "mainstream charters", so he may have been present on other occasions.

== Erik of York and domination of all Northumbria ==
Though Eadwulf and Ealdred had ruled in the north, in the years running up to 954, southern Northumbria was controlled by the Scandinavians, with power switching between Óláfr Sigtryggsson and Eric of York from the early 940s. According to Roger of Wendover's Flores historiarum (early 13th century), Oswulf was responsible for a conspiracy with a certain Maccus that led to the betrayal and death of Eric, ruler of York, "in a certain lonely place called Stainmore".

By the twelfth century, there is a tradition that Oswulf was able to take command of all Northumbria, notwithstanding the overlordship of King Eadred, West Saxon ruler of England. Although this part of the Flores historiarum was compiled centuries later and contains some obvious anachronisms, the author had access to certain earlier sources, no longer extant, making the account credible. The Anglo-Saxon Chronicle names King Eadred as the new ruler of Northumbria following the expulsion of Erik:

Her Norðhymbre fordrifon Yric, 7 Eadred feng to Norðhymbra rice
In this year the Northumbrians drove out Eric and Eadred succeeded to the kingdom".

This is why Richard Fletcher thinks Oswulf was working at Eadred's instigation, and that a grateful Eadred promoted Oswulf ruler of the entire Northumbrian sub-kingdom. Another twelfth-century source, De primo Saxonum adventu, summarises his status as follows:

Primus comitum post Eiricum, quem ultimum regem habuerunt Northymbrenses, Oswulf provincias omnes Northanhymbrorum sub Edrido rege procuravit.
First of the earls after Erik, the last king whom the Northumbrians had, Oswulf administered under King Eadred all the provinces of the Northumbrians.

Similar sentiments were expressed in the related Historia Regum: "Here the kings of Northumbrians came to an end and henceforth the province was administered by earls". Eadred's takeover and Oswulf's rule thus came to be remembered as the beginning of permanent West Saxon control of the North. Historian Alex Woolf argued that this take-over was a personal union of crowns rather like that between Scotland and England in 1603.

== Death and legacy ==
Little else is known about Oswulf's period in power. The Chronicle of the Kings of Alba says that in the time of Indulf (King of Scots from 954 to 962), Edinburgh was abandoned to the Scots, though nothing is said about the involvement of Northumbrians or Oswulf.

The date of Oswulf's death is not known. He was probably dead before 963, as that is the date Oslac appears for the first time as ealdorman in York. It is unclear whether Oslac was related to Oswulf. According to the De primo Saxonum adventu, Northumbria was divided into two parts after Oswulf's death, part came under the control of Oslac, the other under the dominion of Eadwulf Evil-child. '

== Family ==
De Northumbria post Britannos says that Oswulf had a son named Ealdred, father of Waltheof of Bamburgh (fl. 994), father of Uhtred of Northumbria.

There was speculation in the nineteenth century suggesting that Oslac and Eadwulf Evil-child were Oswulf's sons. Others have suggested that Oslac, Eadwulf, and Oswulf were probably related, admitting our ignorance about the precise detail.

== Notes ==
Preceded by unknown (possibly Ealdred)	Ruler of Bamburgh x 946–954 x 963	Succeeded by pos. Eadwulf Evil-child
Preceded by Eric of York; As King of Northumbria	Ruler of Northumbria; Under King Eadred and King Eadwig; 954–x 963	Succeeded by Oslac; South of the River Tees
Preceded by Eric of York; As King of Northumbria	Ruler of Northumbria; Under King Eadred and King Eadwig; 954–x 963	Succeeded by Eadwulf Evil-child; North of the River Tees
