= De obsessione Dunelmi =

11th- or 12th-century manuscript

- "On the siege of Durham"
- Full title: De obsessione Dunelmi et de probitate Uhtredi comitis, et de comitibus qui ei successerunt
- Author(s): anonymous
- Language: Latin
- Date: Late 11th or early 12th century
- Manuscript(s): Cambridge, Corpus Christi College, MS 139
- Subject: St Cuthbert and the property of the church of St Cuthbert
- Period covered: 11th century
- Personages: Earls of Bamburgh, Thurbrand the Hold

De obsessione Dunelmi ("On the siege of Durham") is an historical work written in the north of England during the Anglo-Norman period, almost certainly at Durham, and probably in either the late 11th or early 12th century. It survives in only one copy, transcribed between 1161 and 1167, and the original text is believed to predate this by several decades.

It describes events in 11th century Northumbria, focusing on the lives of the earls of Bamburgh, including their blood feud with Thurbrand the Hold and his descendants. The historian Antonia Grandsden saw it as a kind of biography of Uhtred of Bamburgh, seeing it as the first-known attempt to write a history of an English earldom, while other scholars suggest it originated as a letter.

== Provenance ==
The text survives in only one manuscript, Cambridge, Corpus Christi College, MS 139. In its surviving form, it was written down between 1161 and 1167. The manuscript was at Sawley Abbey, Lancashire by the late 12th century. Derek Baker in 1975 argued that it was probably compiled at Fountains Abbey. M. R. James had argued in 1912 that the manuscript was compiled at Hexham, Northumberland. Theodor Mommsen in 1898, Peter Hunter Blair in 1963 and David Dumville in 1974 (repeated in 1990) argued that the compilation took place at Sawley.

It is almost certain, however, that the text predates its transcription into the Cambridge MS. Bernard Meehan argued that the bulk of the text was composed between 1073 and 1076, before the execution of Earl Waltheof (1076) but after the date of a massacre at Settrington (1073). This is largely on the basis that Waltheof's death goes unrelated, an argument that Morris attacked by pointing out that such things were not important for this particular text, noting other great figures mentioned whose deaths also go unrelated. Morris, for a variety of reasons, favoured a date inside the first two decades of the 12th century, though he conceded that a date in the 1070s was a possibility.

The source which resembles De obsessione Dunelmi most is a letter, immediately preceding De obsessione Dunelmi in the manuscript, written by Symeon of Durham to Hugh, Dean of York Cathedral. Both sources open with similar dating clauses and share a similar style, and it is possible that De obsessione Dunelmi was originally a letter too. A 16th-century incipit in the manuscript attributes the work to Symeon of Durham, though this is too late to be reliable. It is, however, of note that Dean Hugh, when he resigned his deanship in 1135, retired to Fountains Abbey, supposedly taking with him a collection of books.

== Historical account ==
The text of De obsessione Dunelmi describes, among other things, the history of 11th-century Northumbria, the career of the earls of Bamburgh along with their blood feud against Thurbrand the Hold and his descendants. It contains many incidental claims and assertions, is the only source for a large proportion of such claims.

The historian Antonia Gransden viewed it as a biography of Earl Uhtred and described it as the first-known attempt to write a history of an English earldom. The "main story", however, according to the text itself, is the history of six manors belonging, rightfully it is asserted, to the diocese of Durham; the accounts tells how these were transferred several times during the course of the events described. The six manors are:

- Barmpton
- Skirningham
- Elton
- Carlton
- School Aycliffe
- Monk Heselden

The story begins with a Scottish invasion (placed, incredibly, in 969) by Máel Coluim mac Cináeda. The Scots devastate the whole of Northumbria while the elderly Waltheof is shut up in Bamburgh. Ealdhun, Bishop of Durham, gives his daughter Ecgfrida to Waltheof's son Uhtred, along with the six manors, the latter given only so long as Uhtred remains married to Ecgfrida.

Uhtred defeats the Scots, and is given the earldoms of Bamburgh and York as a reward. He proceeds to divorce Ecgfrida in favour of Sige, daughter of Styr, with Bishop Ealdhun supposedly regaining his six vills. The condition of the marriage to Sige is that Uhtred kill Thurbrand, an enemy of Styr. Uhtred then marries Ælfgifu, daughter of King Æthelred the Unready. The text relates that their daughter, Ealdgyth, married Maldred 'son of Crinan, thegn', to whom she bore Gospatric, the father of Dolfin, Waltheof and Gospatric.

Ecgfrida is subsequently married off to Kilvert, son of Ligulf, a thegn from Yorkshire, through whom she mothers a daughter named Sigrid. Sigrid marries Arkil son of Ecgfrith, and they have a son named Gospatric. This Gospatric is said to have married a daughter of Dolfin son of Torfin, producing a son also called, once again, Gospatric. It is related that this last Gospatric "recently" fought a man named Waltheof son of Ælfsige. It is further related, however, that Kilvert divorced Ecgfrida, and Ecgfrida returned to Ealdhun with Barmpton, Skirningham and Elton, and retired to a monastery.

At this point the text returns to Uhtred. Cnut and Swegn of Denmark invade England and ask for Uhtred's help against Æthelred, but the earl remains loyal to the English king. After Swegn and Cnut are victorious, they demand Uhtred's fealty. When Uhtred travels to deliver it at a place called Wiheal, he is murdered by Thurbrand, the man he had earlier pledged to kill to marry Sige.

The story moves on to the succession of Eadulf Cudel, mentioning that the latter ceded Lothian to the Scots out of fear, before resuming the story of the bloodfeud. Eadulf's successor, Ealdred, kills Thurbrand and finds himself in conflict with Thurbrand's son, Carl, until they agree to go to Rome together on pilgrimage. Carl, however, betrays Ealdred and murders him in a forest called Risewood. Later, Ealdred's grandson Waltheof II gets revenge by massacring Carl's sons while they are feasting at a house in Settrington. The narrative then moves back to "the main story" and finishes by relating the disputes and claims that emerge over the six manors.
