= Siege of Durham (1006) =

1006 attack on Durham, England

Date	31 December, 1005
Location	Durham, England 54°46′31″N 1°34′32″W
Result	English victory

Belligerents
Kingdom of Scotland	Kingdom of England

Commanders and leaders
Malcolm II of Scotland	Uhtred of Bamburgh
- Location of Durham within County Durham

The siege of Durham was a 1006 attack on the settlement of Durham, England, conducted by Scottish forces under Malcolm II against the English defenders, possibly as part of an attempt to gain complete control of Cumbria, or part of the traditional raiding of a new Scottish king intended to display their military might. The battle ended in defeat for the Scottish after Uhtred of Bamburgh raised an army from the lands of Bernicia and York to repel the attackers. This victory would lead to Uhtred being named Earl of Bamburgh, and later Earl of York, uniting these lands under his leadership.

Despite his defeat, Malcolm would lead another attack into England in 1018 and gained recognition that the lands north of the River Tweed were under Scottish control after the Battle of Carham.

== Background ==
=== Anglo-Scottish relations ===
During the late 10th century, the kings of Scotland attempted to gain control over the lands of Bernicia, with Indulf gaining Edinburgh during his reign of 954–62. A history of border raids between Scottish and Northumbrian rulers continued into the 11th century, despite an agreement in 973 between Kenneth II of Scotland and Edgar of England, under which the rulers of Scotland gained the lordship of Cumbria in return for defending Cumbria and the English borders from raiders.

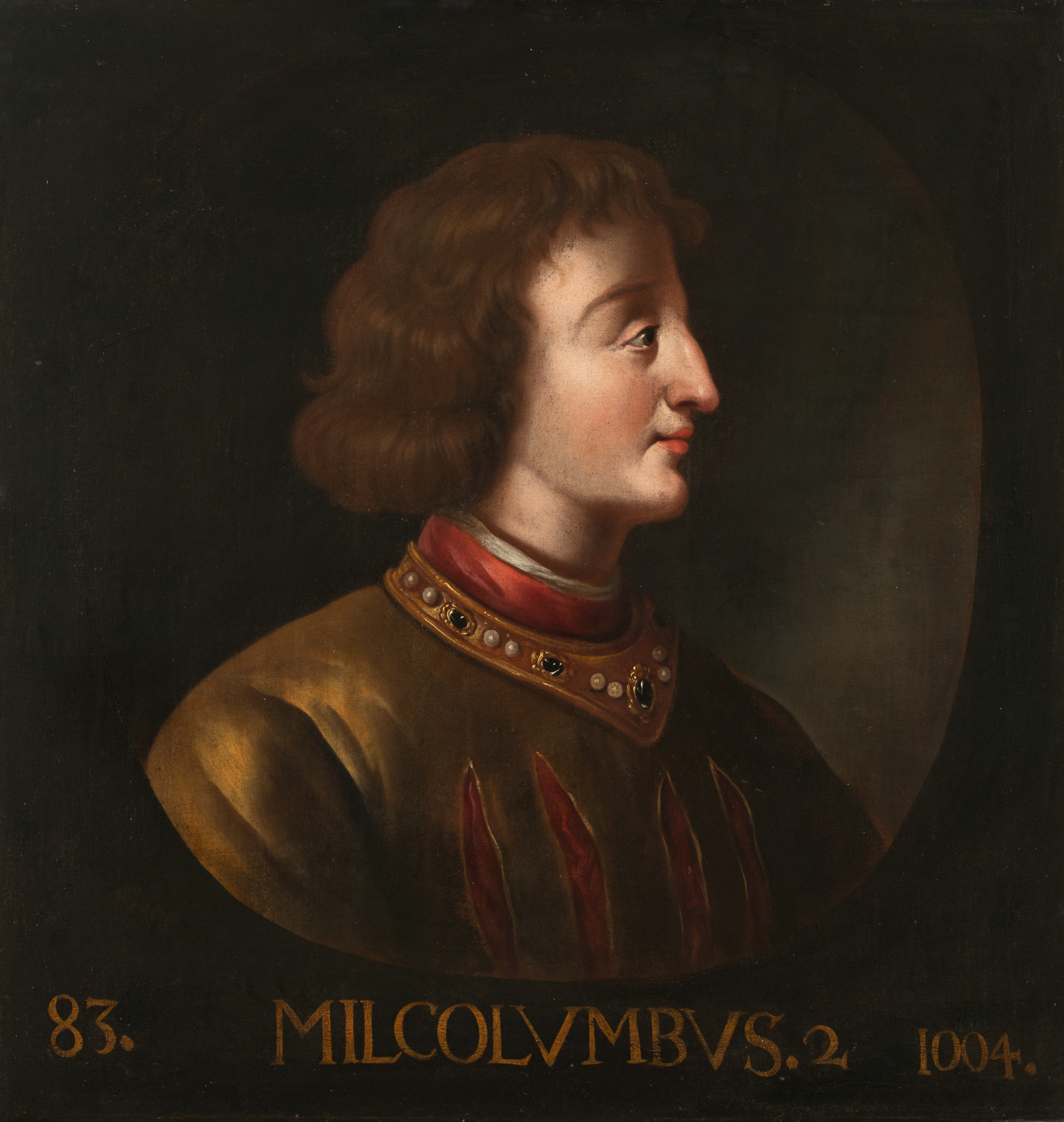
Painting of King Malcolm II of Scotland

Malcolm II became king of Scotland in 1005 and may have wished to gain Cumbria outright at a time when Æthelred II of England was occupied fighting Vikings in southern England, rather than waiting for the English king to gift the lands for which Malcolm would have had to give homage. There was also a tradition of Scottish kings leading raids shortly after ascending the throne to demonstrate their military might, which may have provided a reason for the invasion in 1006.

=== Durham ===
A settlement at Durham was founded in 995 by monks from Lindisfarne and the remains of Cuthbert, patron saint of Northumbria, were moved to this new site. A small stone church had been built on a wooded hill overlooking a u-shaped bend in the river. Uhtred, son of Waltheof, the Earl of Bamburgh, helped the monks clear the site and married the bishop's daughter. De obsessione describes the site as "fortified by nature but not easily inhabitable". Simple defences may have been built to control access to the site.

== Battle ==
In 1006, Malcolm marched into England and besieged Durham. Waltheof was too old to fight and remained in Bamburgh, and Ælfhelm, Earl of York, also declined to offer aid. Acting on his father's behalf, Uhtred, described in De obsessione as a young, energetic man skilled in warfare, raised a force from Bernicia and York and led them to victory over the Scottish invaders.

The Annals of Ulster describe a "slaughter of the good men of Scotland", suggesting many Scottish nobles were killed.

Tradition holds local women were paid a cow each to clean the heads of the fallen attackers before these were mounted on spikes from the town's stockade.

== Aftermath ==
Uhtred's victory brought him to Æthelred's attention, and the king recognised him as earl, despite the fact Waltheof seems to have still lived. Æthelred also granted Uhtred the earldom of York upon Ælfhelm's death, uniting the lands of Northumbria under Uhtred's rule.

Malcolm would again invade Northumbria in 1018 and, after winning the Battle of Carham, gained formal recognition that Northumbrian lands north of the River Tweed were part of Scotland. These lands would remain in Scottish control.

== Sources ==
- Aird, William M. (2004). "Uhtred, earl of Bamburgh". Oxford Dictionary of National Biography (online ed.). Oxford University Press. doi:10.1093/ref:odnb/27981. (Subscription, Wikipedia Library access or UK public library membership required.)
- Archibald, Malcolm (2016). Dance If Ye Can: A Dictionary of Scottish Battles. Creativia. ISBN 978-1536821796.
- Broun, Dauvit (2004). "Malcolm II [Mael Coluim mac Cinaeda]". Oxford Dictionary of National Biography (online ed.). Oxford University Press. doi:10.1093/ref:odnb/17858. (Subscription, Wikipedia Library access or UK public library membership required.)
- Durham University. "The History of Durham Castle". Durham Castle. Durham University.
- Hayes, Jean Anne (2005). Anglian leadership in Northumbria, 547 A.D. through 1075 A.D. (PhD thesis). Louisiana State University. doi:10.31390/gradschool_dissertations.1986.
- Hollway, Don (9 November 2023). Battle for the Island Kingdom: England's Destiny 1000–1066. Bloomsbury Publishing. ISBN 978-1-4728-5894-8.
- Purton, Peter Fraser (2009). A History of the Early Medieval Siege, c. 450-1220. Boydell & Brewer Ltd. doi:10.1017/9781846158032. ISBN 978-1-84383-448-9.
- Rowan, Jo. "Who was Uhtred of Bamburgh?". Sky HISTORY. AETN UK.
- Woolf, Alex; Brown, Michael; Lynch, Michael (2001). "Anglo-Scottish relations". In Lynch, Michael (ed.). The Oxford Companion to Scottish History. Oxford University Press. doi:10.1093/acref/9780199234820.001.0001. ISBN 978-0-19-923482-0.
