= Battle of Carham =

Battle between the Kingdom of Scotland and the Northumbrians at Carham on Tweed

Coordinates: 55°38′13″N 2°19′15″W

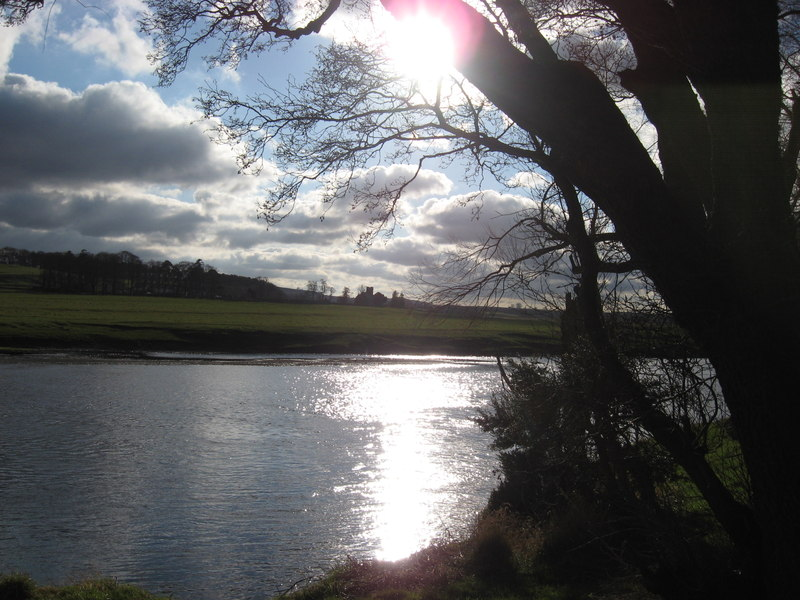
- St Cuthbert's Church, Carham, viewed from the other side of the Tweed, where the battle took place. The minster was a significant economic and administrative centre.
| Date | 1010s (prob. 1018) |
| Location | River Tweed |
| Result | Scottish victory Lothian and the region north of Berwick integrated fully into Scotland |

Belligerents
| Ruler of Bamburgh/ Earldom of Northumbria | Kingdom of Scotland; Kingdom of Strathclyde |

Commanders and leaders
| Uhtred of Bamburgh | King Malcolm II; Owen the Bald |

The Battle of Carham was fought between the English ruler of Bamburgh and the king of Scotland in alliance with the Cumbrians. The encounter took place in the 1010s, most likely 1018 (or perhaps 1016), at Carham on Tweed in what is now Northumberland, England. Uhtred, son of Waltheof of Bamburgh (or his brother Eadwulf Cudel), fought the combined forces of Malcolm II of Scotland and Owen the Bald, king of the Cumbrians (or Strathclyde). The result of the battle was a victory for the Scots and Cumbrians.

== Written records of the battle ==
There are no strictly contemporary sources for the battle, with it going unnoticed in the Anglo-Saxon Chronicle. Historians know of the event primarily because of historical material assembled at Durham in the twelfth century, though the battle is also noted in one Scottish king-list.

In Libellus de exordio, the Benedictine monk Symeon of Durham writing c.1110 recounted a certain famosum bellum, 'infamous battle', of 1018 where a 'countless multitude of Scots' defeated the Northumbrians, causing the contemporary bishop [of St Cuthbert] to die of grief. The same writer was responsible for an entry (under 1018) in the Annals of Lindisfarne and Durham, written c.1100, where were are told that 18 priests fell in the carnage.

The encounter is described, in the 1120s, as ingens bellum inter Anglos et Scottos, 'a massive battle between the English and the Scots', located apud Carrum, 'at Carham', in Anglo-Latin annals known as Historia Regum (and related/derived form like Roger of Howden). We also have a notice of a 'great battle' (magnum bellum) added to a Scottish king-list annotating the reign of Máel Coluim mac Cinaeda, or Malcolm II; king-lists were an evolving tradition from the tenth to fourteenth centuries, and the Carham notice seems to have been added to a surviving recension in the reign of the Scottish king William, grandson of David I (1165–1214).

Relatedly, in the work attributed to the fourteenth-century historian John of Fordun (the basis of which was a thirteenth-century chronicle narrative), we are told how Malcolm II defeated Earl Uhtred while plundering Cumbria, the encounter taking place at Burgum (perhaps Burgh-by-Sands); although not a clear direct reference to any set-piece at Carham, earlier material about the battle may lie behind this notice.

== Dating controversy ==
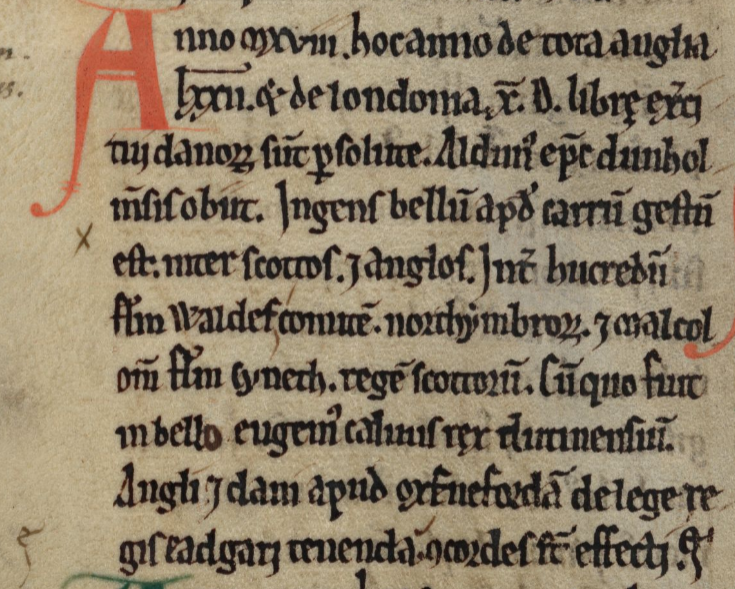
Entry sub anno 1018 in Historia Regum, the main source for our information about the battle.

The Durham sources provide 1018 as the date for the battle, with Historia Regum explicitly naming Earl Uhtred as the leader of the [Northumbrian] English. However, in the near contemporary Anglo-Saxon Chronicle the death of Earl Uhtred is noted two years earlier, leading historians like Plummer and Stenton to re-date the battle to that year, 1016. Previous solutions to this problem had retained 1018 as the year, but with the proposal that the ruler of Bamburgh was Eadwulf Cudel, Uhtred's brother and successor.

Scottish historian Archie Duncan proposed that the reference to Uhtred's death among the events of 1016 was a 'parenthetical' comment, added by an annalist in the 1020s; Duncan argued that Uhtred's death took place after 1016, perhaps 1018 or later. It has been suggested that Duncan's theory is supported by the twelfth-century tract De obsessione Dunelmi, where the death of Uhtred is described; although the killing of Uhtred itself is not given any date, the logic of the events it outlines fits well with events otherwise documented for the year 1018.

Both the Annals of Lindisfarne and Durham and Libellus de exordio, authored by Symeon, record the visibility of a comet 30 days before the battle, which would correlate with astronomical evidence from August 1018. Woolf thus thought that a 1018 battle led by Uhtred was most likely, but accepted the possibility that it may have been his brother Eadwulf. McGuigan has suggested the possibility that our date for the battle goes back to the efforts of Symeon of Durham to regularise traditions about Bishop Ealdhun, the founder of the bishopric of Durham; that Symeon may have placed it along with the comet in a single 1018 narrative to emphasise the significance of Ealdhun's death.

== Politics of the conflict ==
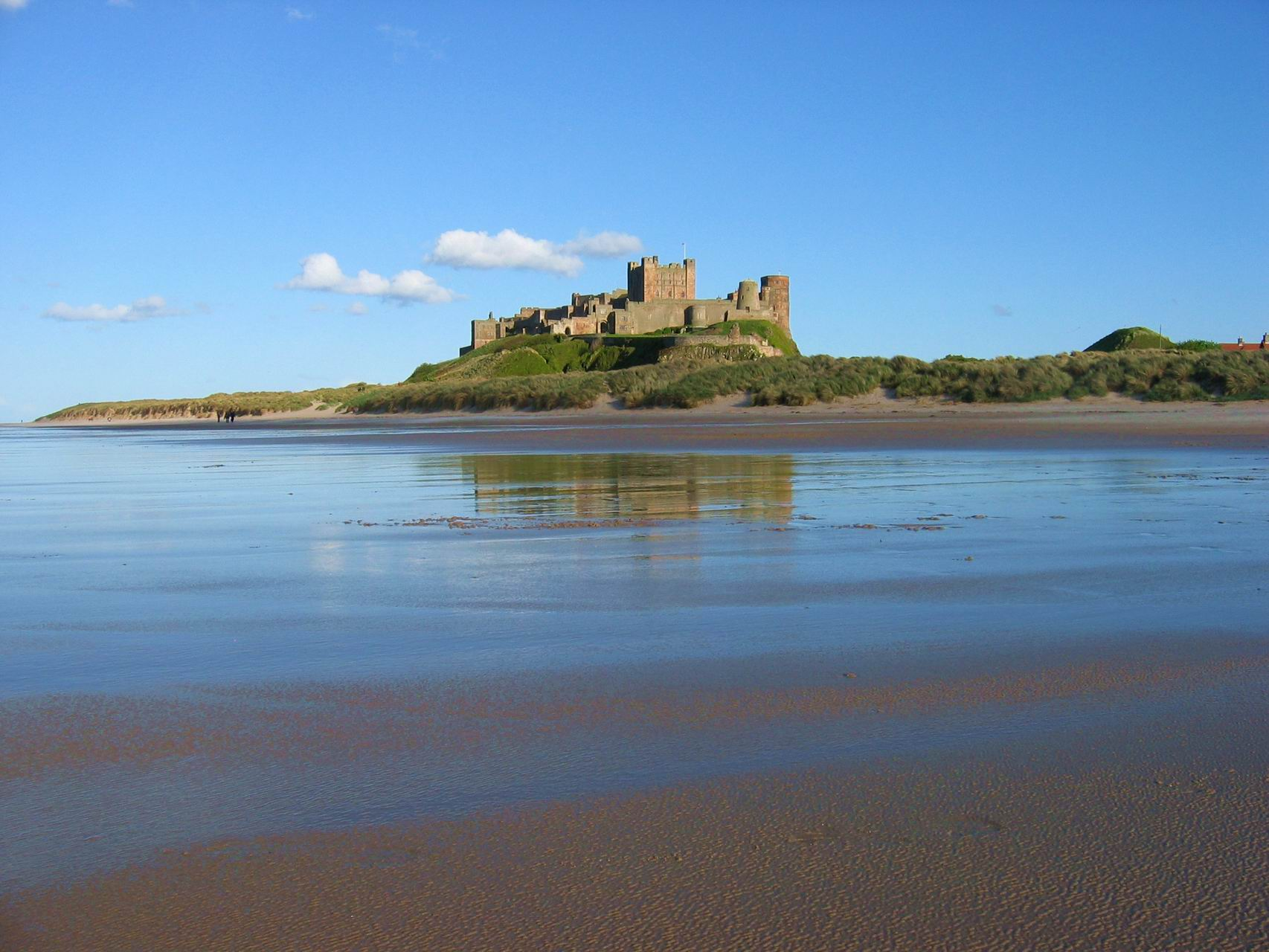
The site of Bamburgh Castle, centre of Uhtred's home dominion.

The fullest list of participants comes from Historia Regum and related Anglo-Latin annals that name not only 'Uhtred son of Waltheof' as leader of the 'English' (Angli) and Malcolm leader of the Scots, but also Eugenius Calvus, Owen the Bald, 'king of the Clyde-folk' (rex Clutinensium).

Uhtred was a member of the Eadwulfing clan who had ruled a rump of the old Northumbrian realm around Bamburgh Castle since the early tenth century. Bamburgh's territories stretched from the Firth of Forth to the River Tyne; the lands between the River Tees and Humber were under the direct jurisdiction of the ealdorman based in York, an official appointed by the West Saxon kings of England.

Between 1006 and 1016 Uhtred himself had also served as ealdorman of York and northern England, meaning that his authority probably extended as far as the East Midlands of England. In 1016 the Danish ruler Cnut the Great became king of England, and a new ealdorman (Eiríkr Hákonarson) was appointed to govern in York; and so, if the battle took place subsequently, as in 1018, Uhtred would have been a diminished ruler; once ruler of most of the old kingdom of Northumbria, he was now reduced to his homeland in Bamburgh and the lower Tweed basin.

The Scots were the northern neighbours of Bamburgh, across the Firth of Forth; to the west across the Ettrick Forest and Tweeddale was the kingdom of Strathclyde, whose people the Northumbrians English called 'Cumbrians'. Historia Regum's term Clutinenses, 'Clyde-folk' or 'people of the River Clyde', it has been argued, likely reflects a local endonym, a Cumbrian rendering of the Welsh vernacular term Cludwys.

Although the mutual interest that brought the Clydeside Cumbrians and Scots into a coalition against the ruler of Bamburgh cannot be explained with certainty, Uhtred's declining political fortune in the face of Cnut's conquest would have made his territory an appealing target for plunder. Despite the suggestion in later historiography, there is no indication in any of the relevant sources that the Clyde king was in any way subordinate to his Scottish counterpart. Historian Fiona Edmonds has argued that pressures to the west and north may have pushed the king of Strathclyde into closer relationship with the Scots.

In 1006, the Scots themselves had been defeated by the Bamburgh English, presumably under Uhtred. Still, the downward spiral of Uhtred's fortunes after 1015 would have presented the opportunity for renewed attack or revenge. The Scottish kingdom in the era appears to have suffered some internal stresses, with the emergence of Clann Ruaidrí as a major force in the north; plunder and military success would have been important for re-establishing Malcolm II's authority and popularity.

It is also possible that the Scots and Strathclyders were pursuing very specific political goals, such as replacing the ruler of Bamburgh in favour of a client or else territorial aggrandisement.

== Encounter and its significance ==
As for the campaign itself, Alex Woolf has suggested that King Malcolm and Owen may have grouped their combined armies 'near Caddonlea (Selkirkshire) […] where the Wedale road from Alba met the Tweeddale road from Strathclyde' In this reconstruction, Uhtred's forces intercepted them before they crossed Cheviot; by the necessity of time recruitment would have been geographically limited, depriving the Bamburgh leader of his full military resources. It is also possible that the combined march, began further north, perhaps at Falkirk, affording the English more time.

The battle's significance is a matter of controversy, especially regarding the region of Lothian. Since the 19th century Scottish historians have linked the battle to the Scottish king's takeover of Lothian. Until the middle of the twentieth century, this interpretation ran counter to what was dominant among English historians, who thought that the transfer of Lothian had already occurred in the 970s as a result of the 'beneficence' of King Edgar the Peaceable, said in one historical tradition dating from the twelfth century to have granted Lothian to the Scottish king Kenneth II.

There were attempts to reconcile the two positions by historian Marjorie Anderson, allowing Carham some significance while accounting for the 'beneficence' of King Edgar. By contrast, G. W. S. Barrow rejected both views and thought saw the process as even earlier still. In more recent years, some historians have become more sceptical about any link between the battle and the Scottish conquest of Lothian, since there is no direct primarily source evidence for any link and since the takeover is not fully evident until the twelfth century and probably incomplete until at least the 1070s. Nonetheless, it has also been argued that the defeat is likely to be a symptom of a greater crisis affecting Bamburgh's secular and ecclesiastical institutions in the first third of the 11th century when the major relics of the region were relocated to Durham.

== Carham 1018 Society ==
The society's mission statement is "to investigate, raise awareness, and commemorate the Battle of Carham." The society's website provides dates for "public meetings, commemorative events, and future plans" as well as excerpts from articles and archaeological findings pertaining to the battle.
