= Ligulf =

11th-century Anglo-Danish nobleman

Ligulf (sometimes Liulf or Ligulf of Lumley; died 1080) was an Anglo-Danish nobleman with landholdings in the north of England.

Ligulf was married to Ealdgyth, the daughter of Ealdred, the Earl of Northumbria. Ligulf's mother was a descendant of the earls of Bernicia. Ligulf was noted for his devotion to Saint Cuthbert.

After the death of Waltheof in 1076, Ligulf was one of the last remaining noblemen in the north with ties to the house of Bamburgh, and he became one of the main advisors to Walcher, the Bishop of Durham. Two of Walcher's other advisors, Leobwin and Gilbert were opposed to Ligulf's advice. According to John of Worcester, Leobwin took offence at the manner in which Ligulf replied to Leobwin's opposition to Ligulf's advice to the bishop. In April or May 1080 they attacked Ligulf's house in the middle of the night and killed most of the household, including Ligulf. The two men were aided by the bishop's own knights, although it is not clear if Walcher was involved in the plot or not.

Ealdgyth survived Ligulf's death, as Walcher offered her a gift of land to settle the feud. Walcher met Ligulf's surviving family, led by Eadulf Rus at Gateshead on 14 May 1080, and attempted to persuade them that the bishop had not been involved in the murder. Walcher as both Bishop of Durham and Earl of Northumbria (a position he purchased) was duty bound to protect its people and prosecute crimes. Ligulf's family did not believe the bishop's protests of innocence, especially since Ligulf's murderers, Leobwin and Gilbert, were among Walcher's party. The Northumbrians presented Walcher with a petition of wrongs committed, which Walcher rejected. This enraged the Northumbrians, who then attacked Walcher and his supporters. Walcher and his men sought refuge in a nearby church which was then set afire. Walcher was killed as he fled the burning church, Ligulf's murderers burned to death in the church as did many of Walcher's other men.

Ligulf and Ealdgyth had two sons – Morcar and Uhtred. Morcar became a monk at Jarrow. Uhtred may be the same as the Uhtred recorded in Domesday Book holding a manor at Rudston in Yorkshire as a tenant-in-chief of the king. Ligulf may also have had a daughter named Ragnald, as a "Ragnald, daughter of Ligulf" is recorded as granting lands to Fountains Abbey in the 1130s. She was married to Robert de Sarz.
