= William de St-Calais =

11th-century Norman bishop of Durham, England

- Bishop of Durham
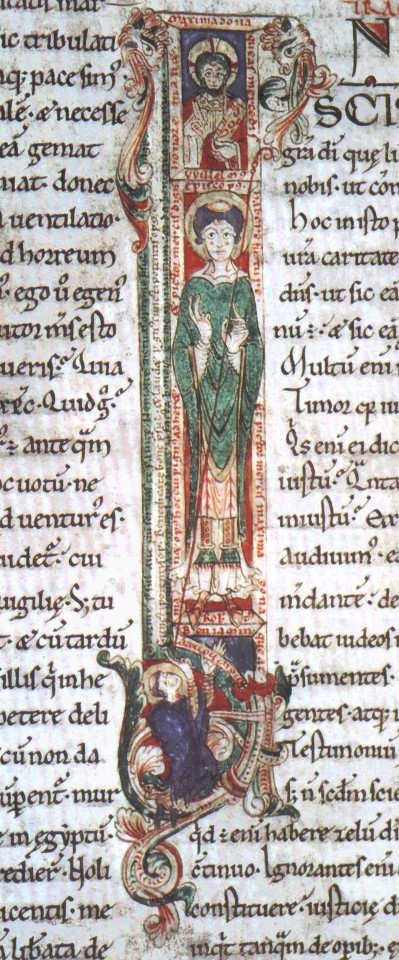
- William of St Calais, from an 11th-century manuscript of St Augustine's; Commentary on the Psalms
- Appointed: 9 November 1080
- Predecessor: Walcher
- Successor: Ranulf Flambard
- Other posts: Abbot of St-Vincent, Le Mans

Orders
- Consecration: either 27 December 1080 or 3 January 1081 by Thomas of Bayeux

Personal details
- Died: 2 January 1096
- Buried: 16 January 1096; Durham Cathedral in the chapter house

William de St-Calais (Note: Also Calais or Carileph or Carilef) (died 2 January 1096) was a medieval Norman monk, abbot of the abbey of Saint-Vincent in Le Mans in Maine, who was nominated by King William I of England as Bishop of Durham in 1080. During his term as bishop, St-Calais replaced the canons of his cathedral chapter with monks, and began the construction of Durham Cathedral. In addition to his ecclesiastical duties, he served as a commissioner for the Domesday Book of 1086. He was also a councillor and advisor to both King William I and his son, King William II, known as William Rufus. Following William Rufus' accession to the throne in 1087, St-Calais is considered by scholars to have been the new king's chief advisor.

When the king's uncle, Odo of Bayeux, raised a rebellion against the king in 1088, St-Calais was implicated in the revolt. William Rufus laid siege to St-Calais in the bishop's stronghold of Durham, and later put him on trial for treason. A contemporary record of this trial, the De Iniusta Vexacione Willelmi Episcopi Primi, is the earliest surviving detailed contemporary report of an English state-trial. Imprisoned briefly, St-Calais was allowed to go into exile after his castle at Durham was surrendered to the king. He went to Normandy, where he became a leading advisor to Robert Curthose, Duke of Normandy, the elder brother of William Rufus. By 1091, St-Calais had returned to England and regained royal favour.

In England, St-Calais once more became a leading advisor to the king. In 1093, he negotiated with Anselm, Abbot of Bec, concerning Anselm's becoming Archbishop of Canterbury; in 1095, it was St-Calais who prosecuted the royal case against Anselm after he had become archbishop. During his bishopric, St-Calais stocked the cathedral library with books, especially canon law texts. He was also active in defending the north of England against Scots raids. Before his death, he had made his peace with Anselm, who blessed and consoled St-Calais on his deathbed.

== Early life ==
St-Calais was a Norman, and a native of Bayeux; he may have been a member of one of its clerical dynasties. His mother's name, Ascelina or Anselma, is given in Durham's records; his father, whose name is unknown, became a monk at the monastery of Saint-Calais in Maine, and may previously have been a knight. Although St-Calais is generally referred to as Saint Calais or St-Calais, the main source of information about his life, the monastic chronicle of Symeon of Durham, does not call him such.

St-Calais studied under Odo, Bishop of Bayeux, the half-brother of the future William I of England, who was then Duke of Normandy. Other bishops educated at Bayeux around this time included Archbishop Thomas of York and Samson, Bishop of Worcester. Symeon of Durham considered St-Calais to be well-educated in classical literature and the scriptures; at some point St-Calais also acquired a knowledge of canon law. He became a Benedictine monk at Saint-Calais in Maine, where his father had become a monk, and soon became the prior of that house. He became abbot of St Vincent-des-Prés near Le Mans in Maine, sometime around 1078. As abbot, his only appearance in historical records is his upholding of the monasteries' right to some property, and his acceptance of a gift of property in the town.

William the Conqueror nominated him to the see of Durham on 9 November 1080, and he was duly consecrated on either 27 December 1080 or 3 January 1081. His elevation may have been a reward for diplomatic services he rendered to the king in France, or to help secure the see from further disorder following the death of the previous bishop, Walcher, during a feud. However, it was most likely in recognition of his administrative ability. Symeon of Durham stated that St-Calais was chosen as a bishop for this reason, describing him as "very well versed in sacred and secular learning, very conscientious in matters of divine and worldly business, and so remarkable for good conduct that he had no equal amongst his contemporaries".

== Early ecclesiastical affairs ==
The chronicler Symeon of Durham asserted that when St-Calais was consecrated bishop by Archbishop Thomas of York, he managed to avoid professing obedience to the archbishop, which, if true, would have freed St-Calais from interference in his diocese. After his appointment, St-Calais decided to replace his cathedral chapter of secular clergy with monks, and consulted the king and Lanfranc, the Archbishop of Canterbury, before going to Rome to receive permission from Pope Gregory VII. These consultations, and the conditions within his diocese, may have kept St-Calais from visiting Durham until some time after his elevation. In 1083 he expelled the married clergy from the cathedral, and moved a small community of monks from Bede's old monastery at Jarrow to Durham, to form the new chapter. This community had been founded at Jarrow by Reinfrid, a Norman ex-knight and monk of Evesham Abbey, and Eadwine, an English monk from Winchcombe Abbey. After the community had settled in Durham, St-Calais named Eadwine as prior, and arranged for lands to be set aside to support the monks. The expelled clergy were offered the option of joining the new monastic house, but only one actually joined.

St-Calais enjoyed good relations with his cathedral chapter, and they supported him when construction began on a new church in 1093. After demolishing an Anglo-Saxon church, he and Prior Turgot of Durham laid the foundation stone on 11 August 1093 for what would later become Durham Cathedral.

St-Calais also gave a set of constitutions to the cathedral chapter, modeled on Lanfranc's rule for Canterbury. Symeon of Durham said that the bishop acted towards the monks of his chapter as a "loving father", and that the monks fully returned the sentiment. St-Calais is said to have researched the pre-Norman Conquest customs of the cathedral exhaustively, before re-establishing monks in the cathedral. He imposed the Monastic Constitutions of Lanfranc on the community, instead of the older Regularis Concordia.

== Work for William the Conqueror ==
During William the Conqueror's reign, St-Calais was a frequent witness on charters. While it is often difficult to determine who was considered most important on a charter's witness list, placement near the top usually indicates that the signatory was considered important. Almost always during the Conqueror's reign, St-Calais is listed right below the royal family and the archbishops.

The king sent St-Calais on diplomatic missions to the French royal court and to Rome. After the king imprisoned Odo of Bayeux, Pope Gregory VII complained to him. The pope was also concerned about the king's refusal to allow the delivery of papal letters to the English bishops unless royal permission was secured. To placate the pope, the king dispatched St-Calais to Rome, possibly with Lanfranc, to explain to the pope the reasons for imprisoning Odo. St-Calais also served as a commissioner in the south-western part of England for the Domesday Book, which aimed to survey the whole of England and record who owned the lands. Some historians, including David Bates, have argued that St-Calais was the driving force behind the organization of the entire Domesday survey, although other candidates have been put forward, including Samson, Bishop of Worcester, before he became bishop. Pierre Chaplais, who argues for St-Calais being the main organizer of the survey, argues the bishop's exile in 1088 interrupted work on the Little Domesday Book, a subproject of the survey which was left uncompleted.

== Rebellion ==
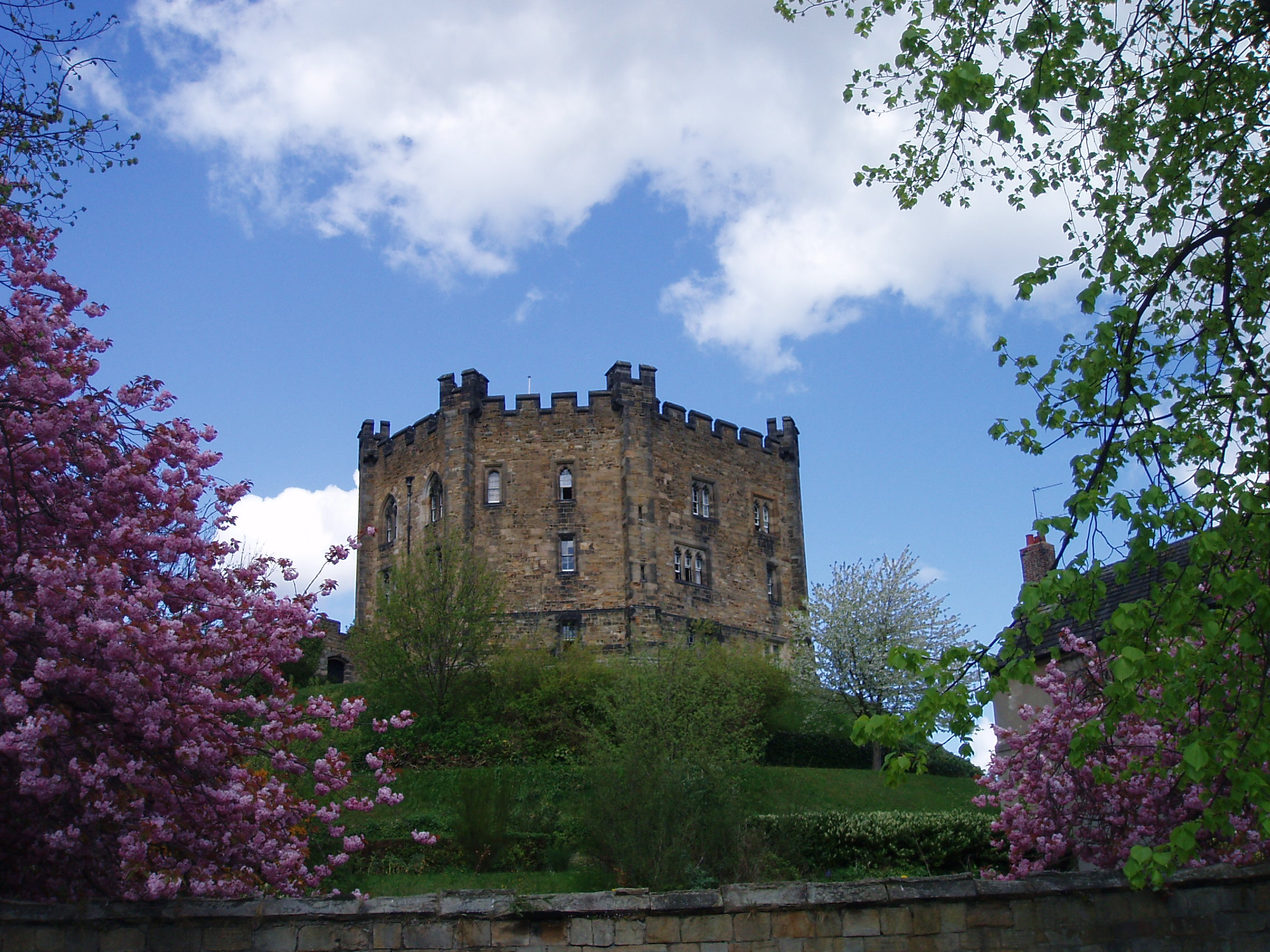
The keep of Durham Castle, where St-Calais shut himself up in 1088

Soon after the accession of William Rufus, St-Calais became one of the king's most trusted lieutenants, along with the recently released Odo of Bayeux. Later chroniclers often referred to the position that St-Calais held as justiciar, although the formal office did not yet exist. (Note: The chroniclers' statements may have come about through confusion with St-Calais's position in Durham, which was a palatinate, or a territory where the ruler had powers which were normally exercised by a king, but without the title of king.) Around Easter 1088, Odo of Bayeux and many of the nobles revolted against the king and tried to place the king's elder brother Robert Curthose, Duke of Normandy, on the throne. After the king had set off with St-Calais and some troops to counter Odo in Kent, St-Calais suddenly deserted, shutting himself in Durham Castle. Why St-Calais joined the rebellion, or at least did nothing to aid the king, is unclear. He and Odo had never been close, and although St-Calais was educated at Bayeux, there is no evidence that Odo helped St-Calais's career. Some historians, including W. M. Aird, have suggested that St-Calais felt the division of the Conqueror's realm between two sons was unwise. It has been suggested that St Calais joined the rebellion to reunite the Normans and English under one ruler.

St-Calais was the only bishop who did not actively aid the king; the rebelling magnates included Roger de Montgomery Earl of Shrewsbury, Robert de Mowbray Earl of Northumbria, and Odo's brother Robert Count of Mortain. The rebellion had failed by the end of the summer, but St-Calais continued to hold out in Durham, at first claiming he had never actually rebelled. When the king's army arrived, St-Calais agreed to come out, but only after receiving a safe conduct that would allow him to attend a trial while his men continued to hold the castle. St-Calais's actions suggest that he did rebel, whatever his claims to the contrary and affirmations of his innocence in northern chronicles.

== Trial ==
St-Calais was brought before the king and royal court for trial on 2 November 1088, at Salisbury, before which the king seized his lands. At the trial, St-Calais held that as a bishop, he could not be tried in a secular court and refused to answer the accusations. Lanfranc presented the king's case, declaring that the confiscated lands had been held as fiefs, and thus St-Calais could be tried as a vassal, not as a bishop. St-Calais objected and continued to refuse to answer the allegations. After numerous conferences and discussions, the court held that St-Calais could be tried as a vassal in a feudal court. St-Calais then asked for an appeal to Rome, which was rejected by the king and the judges. Those judging the case held that because St-Calais never answered the formal accusation, and because he appealed to Rome, his fief, or lands, was forfeit. Although St-Calais claimed to be defending the rights of clergy to be tried in clerical courts and to appeal to Rome, his fellow bishops believed otherwise. Lending support to their belief is the fact that St-Calais never pursued his appeal to Rome, and that later, in 1095, he took the side of the king against Anselm of Canterbury when Anselm tried to assert a right to appeal to Rome.

During the course of the trial, Lanfranc is said to have stated that the court was "trying you not in your capacity as bishop, but in regard to your fief; and in this way we judged the bishop of Bayeux in regard to his fief before the present king's father, and that king did not summon him to that plea as bishop but as brother and earl." Unlike the later case of Thomas Becket, St-Calais received little sympathy from his fellow bishops. Most of the bishops and barons who judged the case seem to have felt that the appeal to Rome was made to avoid having to answer an accusation that St-Calais knew was true. The final judgement was only reached after the king lost his temper and exclaimed: "Believe me, bishop, you're not going back to Durham, and your men aren't going to stay at Durham, and you're not going to go free, until you release the castle." The extant De Iniusta Vexacione Willelmi Episcopi Primi, or Of the Unjust Persecution of the Bishop William I, details the trial of St-Calais before the king. This work is the earliest surviving detailed contemporary report of an English state-trial; some have doubted its authenticity, however, claiming St-Calais would not have been as knowledgeable in canon law as the work portrays him. The historian Mark Philpott argues that St-Calais was knowledgeable in canon law, since he owned a copy of the canon law, the False Decretals, which still survives.

== Return to favour ==
After the court adjourned, St-Calais was held as a prisoner at Wilton Abbey until his followers in Durham relinquished the castle. Once the castle was back under the king's control, St-Calais was released, and exiled; he left for Normandy, and no more was heard of his appeal to Rome. Pope Urban II did write to the king in 1089 requesting that St-Calais be restored to his see, but nothing came of it. In Normandy, St-Calais quickly became one of Duke Robert's principal advisors and his chief administrator. On 14 November 1091 he regained the favour of William Rufus, and was restored to his see. Duke Robert had persuaded the king to allow Bishop William's return, perhaps in recognition of a service St-Calais performed for the king by brokering the end of a siege in Normandy that the king's forces were about to lose. The end of the siege prevented the loss of the castle.

St-Calais returned to Durham on 11 September 1091, with a large sum of money and gifts for his church. Thereafter, he remained in the king's favour. In fact, in 1093, his lands were restored without the need to perform feudal services. For the rest of his life, St-Calais remained a frequent advisor to the king. It was St-Calais, along with Robert, Count of Meulan, who negotiated with Anselm, the abbot of Bec, in 1093 over the conditions under which Anselm would allow himself to be elected Archbishop of Canterbury.

St-Calais managed the king's case against Anselm at Rockingham in 1095, when Anselm wished to go to receive his pallium from Pope Urban II. At that time St-Calais opposed Anselm's attempt to appeal to Rome over the issue, and steadfastly maintained the king's position against Anselm, even advocating that the archbishop be deprived of his lands and sent into exile. Later, when the king was negotiating with Walter of Albano, the papal legate sent by Urban to convey the pallium to Anselm and to secure the king's recognition of Urban as pope, (Note: There was a rival pope at the time, Antipope Clement III, and the king had not recognized either yet.) St-Calais was the king's chief negotiator. The clerical reformers, Eadmer among them, who supported Anselm in these quarrels, later tried to claim that St-Calais had supported the king out of a desire to succeed Anselm as archbishop if Anselm was deposed, but it is unlikely that St-Calais seriously believed that Anselm would be deposed. St-Calais secured grants from the king in return for his services. His efforts on behalf of the king earned him hostile accounts in Eadmer's later writings.

== Diocesan affairs ==
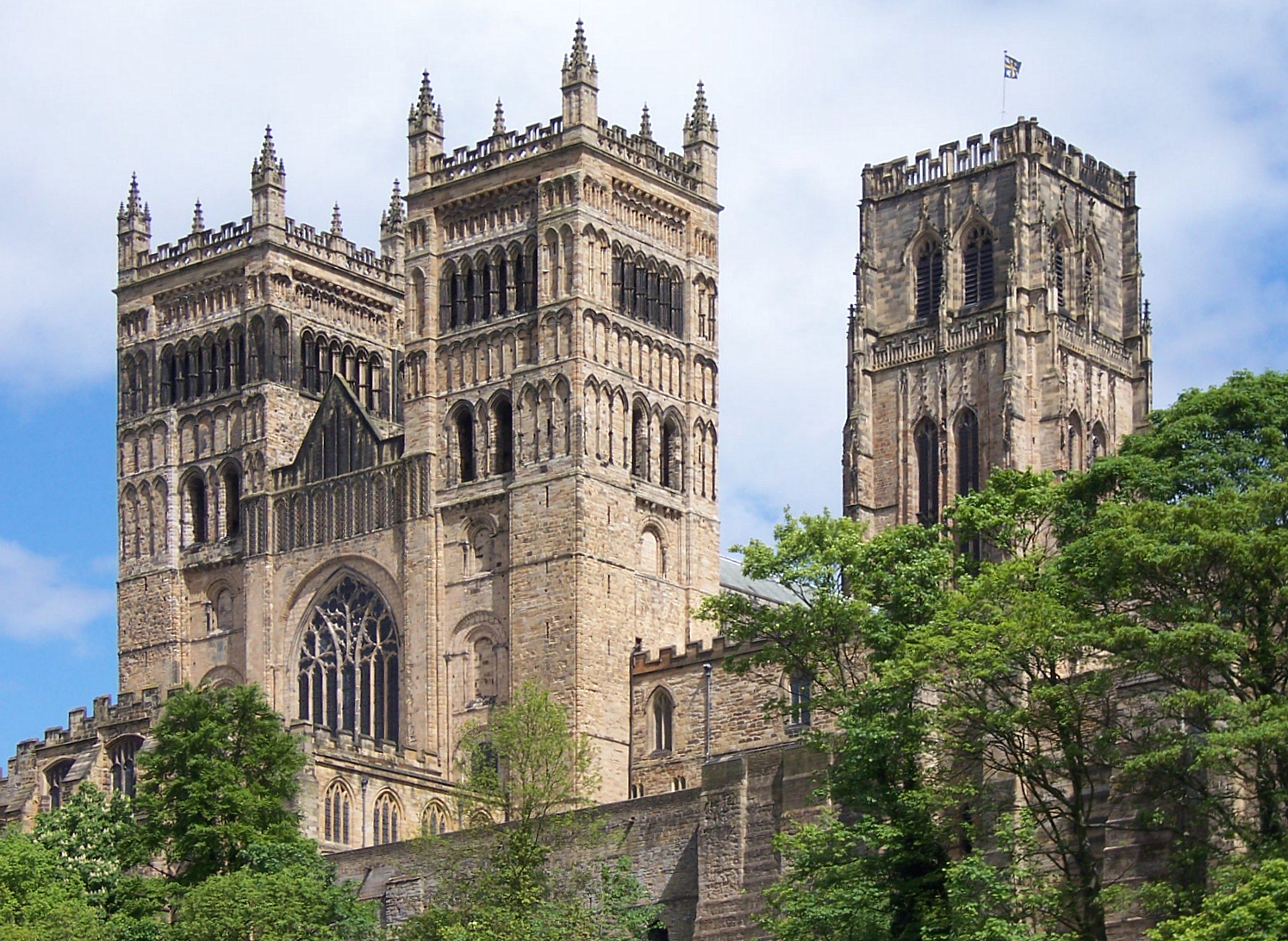
The west façade of Durham Cathedral, which was started by William de St-Calais in 1093

Durham's location in the north left it vulnerable, as Malcolm Canmore, King of Scots, raided and invaded the north of England on several occasions. Malcolm claimed Northumbria, in which Durham was located, as part of his kingdom. St-Calais managed to befriend Malcolm, and secured his support for the patron saint of Durham, Saint Cuthbert. Malcolm and his wife helped lay the foundation stone of the new cathedral dedicated to Cuthbert. Respect for the saint did not mean that Malcolm refrained entirely from raiding the north; he was killed in 1093 while once more raiding Northumbria. Both the English king and St-Calais did all in their power to support Malcolm's sons, who had been educated in England, in their attempts to secure the Scottish throne.

Later, in 1095, an English noble, Robert de Mowbray, who was Earl of Northumbria, challenged the bishop's authority in the north. When Mowbray rebelled again in 1095, St-Calais helped the king put down the rebellion, and Mowbray was captured. The death of Malcolm and the capture of Mowbray did much to make the north more secure.

In St-Calais's time as bishop, a long-running dispute began between the monks of the cathedral chapter and successive bishops. This arose because St-Calais did not make a formal division of the diocesan revenues between the bishop's household and the monks of the chapter. Nor had he allowed free elections of the prior. He may have promised these things to the monks before his death, but nothing was in writing. Thus, when a non-monk was selected to replace St-Calais, the monks began a long struggle to secure what they felt had been promised to them, including the forging of charters ascribed to St-Calais that supported their case. These forged charters date from the second half of the 12th century.

St-Calais also ordered the destruction of the old cathedral that had been built by Aldhun, to make way for the construction of a new, larger cathedral, the current Romanesque-style Durham Cathedral. The construction of the new cathedral began on 29 July 1093, when St-Calais led his cathedral chapter in dedicating the site. The first stones were laid shortly afterwards, on 11 August 1093. However, St-Calais's exile after his trial as well as his employment in the royal service meant that he was often absent from his bishopric, and this probably is the cause of the medieval chronicler Symeon of Durham's comparatively neutral treatment of St-Calais in his works. There is no evidence of St-Calais performing any of the normal episcopal functions, including consecrating priests or churches.

Probably dating from St-Calais's time is the confraternity relationship between the monks of Durham and the monks of the monastery of Saint-Calais in Maine. The cult of Saint Calais appears to have been confined to the region around the monastery which the saint had founded. St-Calais appears to have been a devotee of the cult, and the most likely date for the creation of the confraternity link between the two houses is during St-Calais's time as bishop.

== Death and legacy ==
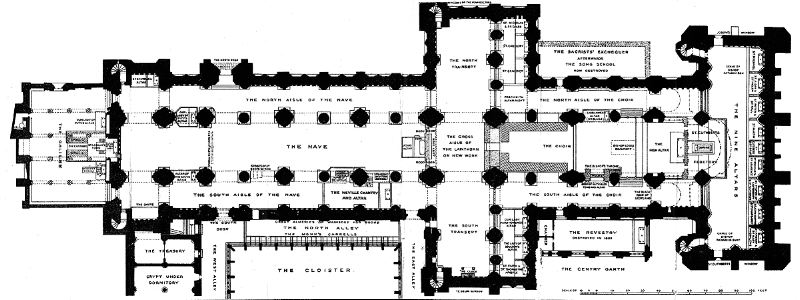
A plan of Durham Cathedral, 1913

Shortly before Christmas 1095, one of St-Calais's knights, Boso, fell ill and dreamed he was transported to the afterlife, where he found a large house with gates made of iron. Suddenly, St-Calais emerged from the gates, asking the knight about the whereabouts of one of his servants. Boso's guide in the dream then warned Boso that St-Calais would soon die. Boso recovered and warned St-Calais of the dream.

St-Calais died on 2 January 1096 in Windsor after falling gravely ill on the previous Christmas Day. Before his death, he was consoled by Anselm and was blessed by his former opponent. His body was taken to Durham where it lay the for the night before his burial in the church of St. Michael. He was buried on 16 January 1096 in the chapter house at Durham. The king had summoned St-Calais shortly before Christmas to answer an unknown charge, and it is possible that the stress of this threat caused his death. In 1796, St-Calais's grave was supposedly found during the demolition of the chapter house at Durham Cathedral. Found in the grave were a pair of sandals, which still survive, and fragments of a gold embroidered robe.

While in office as bishop, St-Calais gave a copy of the False Decretals to his cathedral library. The manuscript was an edition that had been collected or prepared by Lanfranc for the use of the chapter of Canterbury. St-Calais may have used this copy in his trial. His plea for an appeal to Rome was grounded in the False Decretals, whether or not it was based on this particular manuscript. The manuscript itself is now in the Peterhouse Library. St-Calais also gave a copy of Bede's Historia ecclesiastica gentis Anglorum to his cathedral chapter; this copy still survives. Other works that St-Calais gave to the cathedral library were copies of Augustine of Hippo's De Civitae Dei and Confessions; Gregory the Great's Pastoral Care, Moralia, and Homilies; and Ambrose's De Poenitentia.

St-Calais was known to his contemporaries as an intelligent and able man. He had an excellent memory. Frank Barlow, a historian, describes him as a "good scholar and a monk of blameless life". Besides his copy of the Decretals, he left at his death over fifty books to the monks of Durham, and the list of those volumes still exists. (Note: The list is given in Dunelmensis Ecclesiae Cathedralis Catalogi liborum published by the Surtees Society in volume VII of their works in 1838.) His best-known legacy is the construction of Durham Cathedral, although the nave was not finished until 1130. The construction technique of combining a pointed arch with another rib allowed a six-pointed vault, which enabled the building to attain a greater height than earlier churches. This permitted larger clerestory windows, and let more light into the building. The technique of the six-pointed vault spread to Saint-Etienne in Caen from which it influenced the development of early Gothic architecture near Paris. The system of rib vaulting in the choir was the earliest use of that technique in Europe. The historian Frank Barlow called the cathedral "one of the architectural jewels of western Christendom".

== Citations ==
Catholic Church titles
Preceded by Walcher	Bishop of Durham; 1081–1096	Succeeded by Ranulf Flambard
