= Æthelwine (bishop of Durham) =

11th-century Bishop of Durham

- Bishop of Durham
- Appointed: 1056
- Term ended: winter 1071–1072
- Predecessor: Æthelric
- Successor: Walcher

Orders
- Consecration: 1056

Personal details
- Died: winter of 1071–1072
- Denomination: Christian

Æthelwine (Note: Also Egelwin, Aethelwyne, Aethelwine, Aethelwyn, Ethelwin, or Aethelwin) (died c. 1072) was the last Anglo-Saxon bishop of Durham, the last who was not also a secular ruler, and the only English bishop at the time of the Norman Conquest who did not remain loyal to King William the Conqueror.

== Life ==
Æthelwine was consecrated bishop in 1056. He was installed as bishop by Tostig, the Earl of Northumbria and was the choice of King Edward the Confessor. Æthelwine was the brother of the previous bishop, Æthelric, who had been forced to resign after a financial scandal. In 1059, Æthelwine, along with Tostig and Cynesige, the Archbishop of York, accompanied King Malcolm III of Scotland to King Edward's court, where Malcolm may have acknowledged Edward as Malcolm's overlord. Æthelwine oversaw the translation of the relics of the saint Oswine of Deira to Durham in 1065. Æthelwine, like his brother, was unpopular with the clergy of his cathedral, mainly because he was an outsider and had been installed in office without any input from the cathedral chapter. In 1065, the monks of Æthelwine's cathedral chapter were leaders in the revolt against Tostig, which was successful, although Æthelwine remained as bishop.

Æthelwine was initially loyal to King William after the Norman Conquest, and in the summer of 1068, he submitted to William at York. The submission followed on the heels of William building the first castle at York and receiving the submission of most of the northern thegns. Æthelwine also brought word from King Malcolm that the Scottish king wished to live in peace with the new English king. King William sent Æthelwine back to Malcolm's court with William's terms, which were accepted. In 1069, when the new earl of Northumbria Robert de Comines came north to begin governing, it was Æthelwine who warned the new earl about an English army loose in the area. Unfortunately, the new earl did not pay heed to the warning, and was surprised and burned to death in the bishop's house on 29 January 1069. When King William marched north in retaliation on the scorched earth campaign generally known as the Harrying of the North, Æthelwine tried to flee with many Northumbrian treasures (including the body of Saint Cuthbert) to Lindisfarne, but he was caught, outlawed, imprisoned, and later died in confinement in the winter of 1071–1072; his see being temporarily left vacant until William appointed the native of Lorraine Walcher.

== Citations ==
Catholic Church titles
Preceded by Æthelric	Bishop of Durham; 1056–c. 1071	Succeeded by Walcher
