= Æthelric (bishop of Durham) =

11th-century Bishop of Durham

- Bishop of Durham
- Appointed: before 11 January 1041
- Term ended: 1056
- Predecessor: Eadred
- Successor: Æthelwine

Orders
- Consecration: 11 January 1041

Personal details
- Died: 15 October 1072 Westminster
- Denomination: Christian

Æthelric (or Ethelric; died 15 October 1072) was Bishop of Durham from 1041 to 1056 when he resigned.

Æthelric was a monk at Peterborough Abbey before Bishop Eadmund of Durham brought him to Durham to instruct the Durham monks in monastic life. Æthelric was consecrated as bishop on 11 January 1041 at York. (Note: In Manuscript D of the Anglo-Saxon Chronicle it is commented that he was consecrated as the Archbishop of York and became the Bishop of Durham after being deprived of this title. He is listed as archbishop in the 1961 edition of the Handbook of British Chronology but not in later editions.) Æthelric may have owed his advancement to Siward, Earl of Northumbria, who later restored Æthelric to Durham after Æthelric was forced to flee during a quarrel with the Durham monks. Two reasons are given for why Æthelric resigned his see. One story has it happening after a scandal in which he appropriated treasure hoard that was discovered at Chester-le-Street in the process of replacing the old church with a new one. Æthelric allegedly sent the money to his former monastery of Peterborough to finance some building work there. Another reason given was that Æthelric was unable to protect the diocese against locals encroaching on its rights. Æthelric also resigned within a year of the death of Earl Siward, who had been one of the bishop's main supporters. His brother, Æthelwine, who had helped Æthelric to appropriate the treasure, succeeded Æthelric as bishop.

Æthelric retired to Peterborough Abbey, where he remained until the Norman Conquest. He was arrested by the King William I of England after May 1070, and died in captivity at Westminster, on 15 October 1072.

== Citations ==
Christian titles
Preceded by Eadred	Bishop of Durham; 1042–1056	Succeeded by Æthelwine
