= Aldhun =

10th and 11th-century Bishop of Lindisfarne and Bishop of Durham

- Bishop of Durham
- Province: York
- Appointed: 995
- Term ended: 1018 or 1019
- Predecessor: Elfdig (as Bishop of Lindisfarne)
- Successor: Edmund (as Bishop of Durham)
- Previous post: Bishop of Lindisfarne (990–995)

Personal details
- Died: 1018 or 1019
- Denomination: Christian

Aldhun of Durham (died 1018 or 1019), also known as Ealdhun, was the last Bishop of Lindisfarne (based at Chester-le-Street) and the first Bishop of Durham. He was of "noble descent".

Since the late 9th century the see of Lindisfarne was based at Chester-le-Street because of constant attacks from invading Danes. However, in 994 King Æthelred II of England had paid a Danegeld (protection money) to King Sweyn I of Denmark and King Olaf I of Norway in return for peace. The pay-off worked and there followed a period of freedom from Viking raids. This encouraged Aldhun to return the remains of Cuthbert of Lindisfarne to their original resting place at Lindisfarne, and to reinstate the diocese there.

En route to their destination however Aldhun claimed to have received a vision from Cuthbert saying that the saint's remains should be buried at Durham. The monks detoured then to Durham, and the title Bishop of Lindisfarne was transferred to Bishop of Durham. The removal of the see from Chester-le-Street to Durham took place in 995. Symeon of Durham is the main source for information about the moving of the see, and he states that Uhtred the Bold helped the monks clear the site of the new cathedral, which was consecrated in 998.

Aldhun was a bishop for 24 years, which puts his death in 1018 or 1019. He was said to have died of heartbreak because of the defeat of the Northumbrians by the Scots at the battle of Carham.

Aldhun's daughter Ecgfrida married first Uhtred the Bold who was Earl of Northumbria from 1006 to 1016. The marriage probably took place close to the time when Uhtred helped her father move the see to Durham. Their son Ealdred was the grandfather of Waltheof, Earl of Northumbria. After he repudiated her, she married a northern thegn Kilvert.

== Citations ==
Christian titles
Preceded by Elfdig	Bishop of Lindisfarne; 990 to 995	See transferred to Durham
New title	Bishop of Durham; 995 to 1018 or 1019	Succeeded by Edmund
