= Thurbrand the Hold =

Northumbrian magnate in the early 11th century

- Born: birth date unknown birth place unknown
- Died: c. 1024; Northumbria
- Cause of death: Ealdred II of Bamburgh, Earl of Northumbria
- Other name: Thorbrand
- Known for: Killing Uhtred the Bold, Earl of Northumbria
- Children: 1 known son: Carl. 4 known grandsons: Thurbrand, Cnut, Sumarlithr, and another (whose name is lost)
- Parent: unknown

Thurbrand (Old English: Þūrbrand; fl. 1010s; died c. 1024), nicknamed "the Hold", was a Northumbrian magnate in the early 11th century. Perhaps based in Holderness and East Yorkshire, Thurbrand was recorded as the killer of Uhtred the Bold, Earl of Northumbria. The killing appears to have been part of the war between Sweyn Forkbeard and Cnut the Great against the English king Æthelred the Unready, Uhtred being the latter's chief Northumbrian supporter. Thurbrand may also have attested a charter of 1009 and given a horse to Æthelred's son Æthelstan Ætheling. The killing is the first-known act, if it did not initiate, a bloodfeud between Thurbrand's family and Uhtred going into the time of Earl Waltheof. It is possible that Holderness took its name because of Thurbrand's presence or ownership of the peninsula.

== Background ==
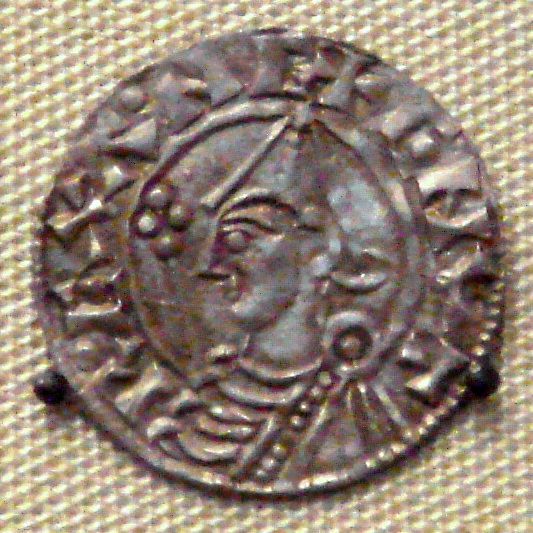
Coin of Cnut from the British Museum (in London)

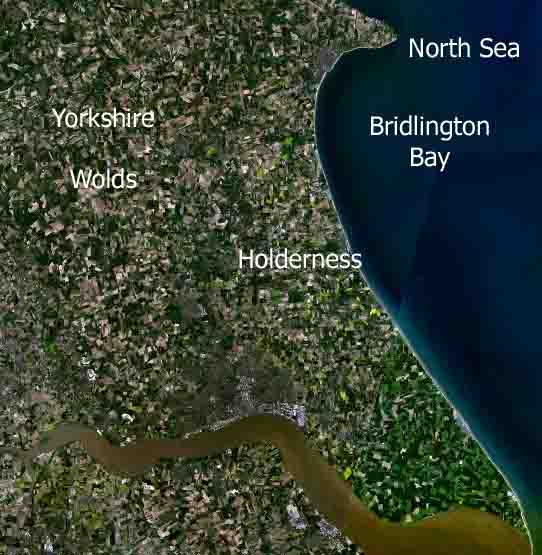
Holderness from space

Thurbrand's floruit lay in the reigns of Æthelred (978–1016), Sweyn Forkbeard (1013–1014) and Cnut (1016–1035). The Historia Regum and Chronicle of John of Worcester say that Thurbrand was a "Danish nobleman" (nobilo et Danico viro) His title, that of "Hold", derives from an office said by the Norðleoda laga ("Law of the North People") to have been equal in wergild to a royal high-reeve, above a thegn but below an ealdorman. There is a strong possibility that Thurbrand ruled Holderness (see below).

In a charter of 1009, recording King Æthelred's grant of land in Derbyshire to a thegn named Morcar, the 26th thegn on the witness list is named Thurbrand (Þurbrand). In the will of Æthelstan Ætheling, dating to 1014, a Þurbrand is said to have given the ætheling a horse. It is possible that either or both are Thurbrand the Hold.

According to the late-11th- or early-12th-century Durham tract called De obsessione Dunelmi, Thurbrand was the "leading enemy" of Styr son of Ulf. The same source says that Styr was a "wealthy citizen", perhaps of the city of York, and he was notable according to the Historia de Sancto Cuthberto and the Libellus de Exordio for giving Darlington and other lands to the church of Durham. De Obsessionee says that the Earl of the Northumbrians Uhtred the Bold married Styr's daughter Sige on the condition that he would kill Thurbrand, becoming "a kind of contract killer" [Fletcher]. It becomes apparent, however, that Uhtred failed to carry out his task—although it is presumed he tried—as Thurbrand lived to slay Uhtred.

== Killing of Uhtred ==
De Obsessione relates that Uhtred had taken King Æthelred's daughter Ælfgifu as his new wife, perhaps as part of a deal made by the king in order to ensure Uhtred's loyalty against Sweyn Forkbeard and Cnut or else as a reward for loyalty already proven. De Obsessione goes on to describe Earl Uhtred's death at the hands of Thurbrand:

After King Æthelred's death, when Cnut had laid hands upon the whole kingdom of England, he sent to the earl ordering him to come to him as his new lord. He did so, having accepted safe conduct for his journey and return. On the appointed day, he entered the king's presence at Wiheal to discuss terms of peace; through the treachery of a powerful king's thegn, Thurbrand, known as "Hold", the king's soldiers who had hidden behind a curtain spread across the width of the hall, suddenly sprang out in mail and slaughtered the earl and forty of his chief men who had entered with him.

The Anglo-Saxon Chronicle versions C D and E, John of Worcester's Chronicle and the Historia Regum add that one of the nobles killed with Uhtred was Thurcytel son of Nafena. The sources indicate that Cnut had been behind the killing, following it up with the appointment of Eric of Hlathir as earl.

The killing has been dated to 1016, as this is the year it falls under in the Anglo-Saxon Chronicle, the Chronicle of John of Worcester and the Historia Regum. Historian A. A. M. Duncan has argued that this date is unreliable. The Anglo-Saxon Chronicle, reflecting closely the source for the Historia Regum and the Worcester Chronicle on this entry, does not say that Uhtred died in this year, merely adding as an aside that Uhtred and Thurcytel were later killed despite having submitted to Cnut in this year. The location of this killing is given as Wiheal. This has been identified as Wighill, a place just north-west of the Roman road north of Tadcaster but south of York. This identity, however, is far from secure, an alleged weak point being that the early spellings of Wighill (e.g. Wichele) do not resemble De Obsessione's Wiheal very closely. Another possibility is Worrall near Sheffield, spelled Wihala and Wihale in the Domesday Book.

== Death and legacy ==
If De Obsessione is to be believed, Thurbrand met his death at the hands of Uhtred's son, Ealdred. This is thought to have occurred around 1024. One son of Thurbrand is known, Carl. Carl was known to have had four sons; two of them, Cnut and Sumarlithr, are known definitely by name, and the eldest is thought to have been Thurbrand of Settrington, whose land was taken by Berengar de Tosny after the Norman conquest of Northumbria. As some of Thurbrand's descendants, Cnut in particular, held land in the East Yorkshire peninsula of Holderness, it has been suggested that Thurbrand may have been "the Hold" from whom the peninsula gained its name, "Cape of the Hold".

Ealdred was killed by Carl, and two of Carl's sons in turn were killed by Ealdred's grandson, Earl Waltheof. The multi-generational feud allegedly behind all these killings are the subject of Richard A. Fletcher's Bloodfeud: Murder and Revenge in Anglo-Saxon England, published in 2002 by Penguin Books. Fletcher's fellow historian William E. Kapelle had argued that these events do not signify a pre-existing bloodfeud at all. Kapelle thought that the dispute between Uhtred and Thurbrand was a result of Uhtred's attempt to control Yorkshire, and this led to the later bloodfeud. Fletcher rejected Kapelle's arguments, claiming that Kapelle misunderstood the context and created a false distinction between social and political conflict. William M. Aird and other historians have held that Thurbrand represented a "Scandinavian party", and Uhtred a "Wessex faction", while the dispute in general is taken as evidence of tension between ["English"] Northumbria north and ["Danish"] Northumbria south of the River Tees.
