= Eadwulf Rus =

Northumbrian noble (fl. 1080)

- Born: unknown
- Died: 1080s
- Cause of death: murdered
- Resting place: Jedburgh Abbey
- Known for: Killing of Walcher, Bishop of Durham and Earl of Northumbria
- Parent(s): Descendant of Uhtred the Bold via his son Gospatric; either a son of Gospatric or a son of Gospatric's son Uhtred

Eadulf or Eadwulf Rus (fl. 1080) was an 11th-century Northumbrian noble. He was either the son or grandson of Gospatric (son of Uhtred the Bold), possibly the man who soon after Christmas 1064 was allegedly killed on behalf of Tostig, Earl of Northumbria. This murder by Tostig led to a great northern revolt against Edward the Confessor, a revolt that turned both King Edward and Harold Godwinson against Tostig and led to the appointment of the Mercian, Morcar, as Earl of northern England.

Eadwulf is primarily remembered for his involvement in the death of Walcher, Earl of Northumbria and Bishop of Durham. The sources say that the attack occurred as revenge for the murder of Walcher's English right-hand man, Ligulf. Ligulf had been connected into the Bamburgh kindred marrying, according to the Historia Regum, Ealdgyth daughter of Ealdred, Earl of Bamburgh.

The Worcester Chronicle and the Historia Regum allege that the murder of Ligulf was planned by Walcher's chaplain Leobwin after Ligulf had argued with him during one of the earl's councils. It was Walcher's kinsman Gilbert, however, who is alleged to have entered Ligulf's hall, and attacked and killed him. Kapelle thought that, perhaps due to his failure to protect Northumberland against the Scots in 1079, Walcher's relations with Ligulf broke down, leading to the loss of Ligulf's support and then to hostility.

On 14 May 1080 a party of Northumbrian natives attacked that bishop-earl and his household at Gateshead, across the river from the future site of Newcastle-Upon-Tyne, having arrived to hold discussions. The discussions were fruitless and Walcher, who was protected with 100 knights, retired to the church there. The Northumbrians set the church on fire, after Leobwin refused to surrender himself. Walcher was forced out and stabbed with swords. Leobwin was burned to death.

De primo Saxonum adventu says that the leader was Eadwulf, son of Gospatric; the Historia Regum also names, Eadwulf cognomento Rus as the killer, but claims he was a grandson of Gospatric through another Uhtred. The Libellus de exordio says that killer was a man named Waltheof, though this Waltheof may have been Eadwulf's brother.

According to the Historia Regum Eadwulf was killed soon after the death of Walcher, slain by a woman. His body was buried in the church at Jedburgh (now Scottish Borders), until Prior Turgot of Durham Cathedral had it removed a few years later. Eadwulf may have had a brother named Dolfin in addition to a brother named Waltheof.
