= Waltheof of Bamburgh =

English noble

Waltheof was high-reeve or ealdorman of Bamburgh (fl. 994). He was the son of Ealdred and the grandson of Oswulf I and was father of Uhtred the Bold, Ealdorman of Northumbria.

The name 'Waltheof' remained in his family when Earl Siward married his great-granddaughter and named his son Waltheof. This son of Siward became Waltheof, Earl of Northumbria, and one of his descendants was Saint Waltheof of Melrose. Additionally, another branch of the family would use the Waltheof name including: Waltheof of Allerdale, who was the son of Gospatric, Earl of Northumbria. Waltheof of Inverkeithing and Dalmeny was the son of Cospatric, and the grandson of Waltheof of Allerdale. Another descendant of Gospatric, Earl of Northumbria was Waltheof, Earl of Dunbar.

== History ==
In 1006 Malcolm II of Scotland invaded Northumbria and besieged the newly founded episcopal city of Durham. At that time the Danes were raiding southern England, and King Æthelred was unable to send help to the Northumbrians. Ealdorman Waltheof was too old to fight and remained in his castle at Bamburgh. Ealdorman Ælfhelm of York also took no action. Waltheof's son Uhtred, acting for his father, called together an army from Bernicia and Yorkshire and led it against the Scots. The result was a decisive victory for Uhtred. Local women washed the severed heads of the Scots, receiving a payment of a cow for each, and the heads were fixed on stakes to Durham's walls. Uhtred was rewarded by King Æthelred II with the ealdormanry of Bamburgh even though his father was still alive.

== Issue ==
Waltheof has been identified as the father of two sons; their mothers are unknown:

- Uhtred the Bold (also spelled Uchtred), Ealdorman of Northumbria; married several times including Ælfgifu, daughter of King Æthelred the Unready
- Eadwulf Cudel, Ealdorman of Bamburgh

== Sources ==
- Stenton, Sir Frank M. Anglo-Saxon England; 3rd edition. Oxford University Press, 1971.

Regnal titles
Preceded by Eadwulf Evil-child	Ruler of Bamburgh fl. 994	Succeeded by Uhtred the Bold
