= Walcher =

11th-century Bishop of Durham

- Bishop of Durham
- Appointed: c. 1071
- Installed: probably 3 April 1071
- Term ended: 14 May 1080
- Predecessor: Æthelwine
- Successor: William de St-Calais

Orders
- Consecration: 1071

Personal details
- Died: 14 May 1080 Gateshead
- Denomination: Catholic

Walcher (Note: Sometimes Walchere or Walker) (died 14 May 1080) was the bishop of Durham from 1071, a Lotharingian and the first Prince-bishop (appointed by the King, not the Pope). He was the first non-Englishman to hold that see and an appointee of William the Conqueror following the Harrying of the North. He was murdered in 1080, which led William to send an army into Northumbria to harry the region again.

== Career ==
Walcher was a priest in Lotharingia from Liège and a secular clerk. He was invited by William I to fill the post of Bishop of Durham, and he was consecrated bishop in 1071 and probably enthroned on 3 April 1071. During the first part of his term as bishop, he was on friendly terms with Waltheof, Earl of Northumbria, so much so that Waltheof sat with the clergy when Walcher held synods. After Waltheof rebelled and lost his earldom, Walcher was allowed to buy the earldom of Northumbria. Walcher planned to introduce monks into his cathedral chapter, and was remembered as encouraging monasticism in his diocese. Particularly, he was known as the patron of Aldwine, who attempted to re-establish monasticism at Whitby. Eventually, the group settled at Durham under Walcher's successor William de St-Calais. The medieval chronicler Symeon of Durham stated that Walcher had begun construction of monastic buildings at Durham as part of his plan to introduce monks into Durham.

One of Walcher's councillors was Ligulf of Lumley, who was connected by birth to the old Northumbrian line and was married to the daughter of Ealdred, Earl of Bernicia. Ligulf's presence in the bishop's council provided a link with the local aristocracy. There was a Scottish invasion in 1079, which Walcher was unable or unwilling to deal with effectively. The Scots, under Malcolm III, were able to plunder Northumberland for about three weeks unopposed before returning to Scotland with slaves and booty. Ligulf was very critical of Walcher's conduct. A feud ensued between Ligulf and two of Walcher's henchmen, his chaplain Leobwin and his kinsman Gilbert. Gilbert attacked Ligulf's hall in the middle of the night and Ligulf and most of his household were killed.

The Northumbrians were enraged at the murder of one of their leaders and there was a real threat of rebellion. In order to calm the situation Walcher agreed to travel from Durham and meet Ligulf's kinsmen at Gateshead. He travelled with at least one hundred retainers for safety. At Gateshead, he met Eadulf Rus the leader of the kinsmen and was presented with a petition of wrongs committed. Walcher rejected these and the enraged Northumbrians attacked the Norman party. Walcher and his men sought refuge in a nearby church but the Northumbrians set fire to it. Leobwin died in the blaze and when Walcher, Gilbert and the rest of his party were forced out by the flames they were killed on 14 May 1080 at Gateshead.

A UNESCO report on Durham Castle provided this additional information about the bishop:

Walcher "purchased the earldom [of Northumbria] and thus became the first of the Prince-Bishops of Durham, a title that was to remain until the 19th century, and was to give Durham a unique status in England. It was under Walcher that many of the Castle's first buildings were constructed. As was typical of Norman castles, it consisted of a motte (mound) and an inner and outer bailey (fenced or walled area). Whether the motte and inner bailey were built first is unknown".

== Character ==
Walcher was a saintly man but an incompetent leader. According to Symeon of Durham, Walcher's household knights were allowed to plunder and occasionally kill natives without punishment.

Walcher was considered a well-educated bishop, and had a reputation as a pious man. Symeon of Durham portrayed him as an honest, upright man who diligently performed his episcopal duties. Walcher's successor as Earl of Northumbria was Aubrey de Coucy. William de St-Calais was the next bishop, though not earl.

== Aftermath of his death ==
Following the killing of Walcher, the rebels attacked Durham Castle and besieged it for four days, before returning to their homes. The result of their rising and the killing of William's appointed bishop, led William to send his half brother Odo of Bayeux with an army to harry the Northumbrian countryside. Many of the native nobility were driven into exile and the power of the Anglo-Saxon nobility in Northumbria was broken.

== Citations ==
Catholic Church titles
Preceded by Æthelwine	Bishop of Durham; 1071–1080	Succeeded by William de St-Calais
Regnal titles
Preceded by Waltheof	Earl of Northumbria; 1075–1080	Succeeded by Aubrey de Coucy
