= Eadwulf Cudel =

Ruler of Bamburgh (died early 1020s)

Eadwulf Cudel or Cutel (meaning cuttlefish) (died early 1020s), sometimes numbered Eadwulf III, was ruler of Bamburgh for some period in the early eleventh century. Following the successful takeover of York by the Vikings in 866/7, southern Northumbria became part of the Danelaw, but in the north English rulers held on from a base at Bamburgh. They were variously described as kings, earls, princes or high-reeves, and their independence from the kings of England and Scotland is uncertain. Uhtred the Bold and Eadwulf Cudel were sons of Waltheof, ruler of Bamburgh, who died in 1006. He was succeeded by Uhtred, who was appointed by Æthelred the Unready as earl in York, with responsibility for the whole of Northumbria. Uhtred was murdered in 1016, and king Cnut then appointed Erik, son of Hakon, earl at York, while Eadwulf succeeded at Bamburgh.

In 1018, the Northumbrians of Bamburgh were defeated by Malcolm II of Scotland in the Battle of Carham. In one twelfth-century Durham source, De obsessione Dunelmi, Ealdulf is described as "a very lazy and cowardly man", who ceded Lothian, the northern part of Bernicia, to the Scots—though the historicity of this claim is disputed, one of several twelfth-century English accounts that try to explain the 'loss' of Lothian to Scotland. Another twelfth-century tradition relates that Lothian had been under Scottish control since the time that King Edgar ceded it to Kenneth II of Scotland in the early 970s. Recently, it has been argued that Lothian remained part of the principality of Bamburgh until its dissolution around 1090, during the reign of Malcolm III.

Eadwulf does not appear in any contemporary source, though it may deduced that he died sometime in the 1020s, and that he was succeeded by Uhtred's son, Ealdred.

Preceded by Uhtred the Bold	Ruler of Bamburgh; 1016–1020/1025	Succeeded by Ealdred II
