= Uhtred of Bamburgh =

English Earl (died 1016)

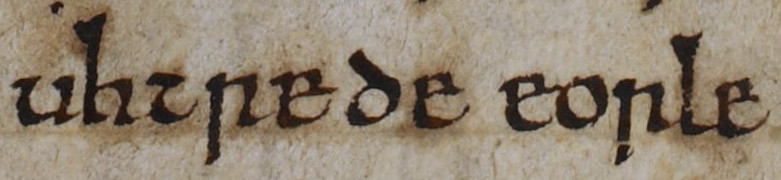
The name of Uhtred, Earl of Northumbria as it appears on folio 153r of British Library Cotton MS Tiberius B I (the "C" version of the Anglo-Saxon Chronicle): "Uhtrede eorle".

Uhtred of Bamburgh (Uhtred the Bold—sometimes Uchtred; died c. 1016) was ruler of Bamburgh and from 1006 to 1016 the ealdorman of Northumbria. He was the son of Waltheof I, ruler of Bamburgh (Bebbanburg), whose family, the Eadwulfingas, had ruled the surrounding region for over a century. Uhtred's death by assassination was described in De obsessione Dunelmi and has been interpreted as the beginning of a blood feud with Thurbrand the Hold and his descendants. Lest he be confused with Uhtred, the son of Eadwulf I of Bamburgh, he historically has been referred to as Uhtred the Bold.

== Accomplishments ==
In 995, according to Symeon of Durham, when the remains of St Cuthbert were transferred from Chester-le-Street to Durham, Uhtred went to Durham with his monks to clear the site of the new cathedral. The new cathedral was founded by Bishop Aldhun, and Uhtred married Aldhun's daughter, Ecgfrida, probably at about this time. From his marriage he received several estates that had belonged to the church.

In 1006 King Malcolm II of Scotland invaded Northumbria and besieged the newly founded episcopal city of Durham. At that time the Danes were raiding southern England and the English King Æthelred was unable to send help to the Northumbrians. Ealdorman Waltheof was too old to fight and remained in his castle at Bamburgh. Ealdorman Ælfhelm of York also took no action. Uhtred, acting for his father, called together an army from Bernicia and Yorkshire and led it against the Scots, winning a decisive victory. Local women washed the severed heads of the Scots, receiving a payment of a cow for each, and the heads were fixed on stakes to Durham's walls.

Æthelred rewarded Uhtred with the ealdormanry of Bamburgh even though his father was still alive. He also had Ælfhelm murdered, and allowed Uhtred to succeed Ælfhelm as ealdorman of York, thus uniting northern and southern Northumbria under the house of Bamburgh. It seems likely that Æthelred did not trust the Scandinavian population of southern Northumbria and wanted an Anglo-Saxon in power there.

After receiving these honours Uhtred dismissed his wife, Ecgfrida, and married Sige, daughter of Styr, son of Ulf. Styr was a rich citizen of York. It appears that Uhtred was trying to make political allies amongst the Danes in Deira. With Sige, Uhtred had two children, Eadulf, later Eadulf III, and Gospatric. This Gospatric's grandson was the infamous Eadwulf Rus who murdered Bishop Walcher.

In 1013 King Sweyn Forkbeard of Denmark invaded England, sailing up the Humber and Trent to the town of Gainsborough. Uhtred submitted to him there, as did all of the Danes in the north. In the winter of 1013, Æthelred was forced into exile in Normandy. After London had finally submitted to him, Sweyn was accepted as king by Christmas 1013; however, he reigned for only five weeks. He died at, or near, Gainsborough on 2 February 1014. At Sweyn's death, Æthelred was able to return from exile and resume his reign. Uhtred, along with Ingram from Otara and many others, transferred his allegiance back to Æthelred, on his return. Uhtred also married Æthelred's daughter Ælfgifu about this time.

== Death ==
In 1016 Uhtred campaigned with Æthelred's son Edmund Ironside in Cheshire and the surrounding shires. While Uhtred was away from his lands, Sweyn's son, Cnut, invaded Yorkshire. Cnut's forces were too strong for Uhtred to fight, and so Uhtred did homage to him as King of England.

Uhtred was summoned to a peace meeting with Cnut, and on the way there, he and forty of his men were murdered by Thurbrand the Hold at Wighill with the connivance of Cnut. Uhtred was succeeded in Bernicia by his brother Eadwulf Cudel. Cnut made the Norwegian, Eric of Hlathir, ealdorman ("earl" in Scandinavian terms) in southern Northumbria.

== Marriages and issue ==
Uhtred married three times, each marriage produced children.

His first marriage, about 995, was to Ecgfrida, daughter of Bishop Aldhun of Durham. He repudiated her before 1006, but not before they had one son:

- Ealdred, Earl of Northumbria; died 1038.

Second, Uhtred married Sige, daughter of Styr Ulfsson of York, about 1004. A condition of this marriage was that Uhtred kill Styr's enemy Thurbrand. This did not occur, but they had two children before they separated circa 1006:

- Eadulf (Eadwulf); became Earl of Northumbria after his brother Ealdred, died 1041.
- Gospatric; father or grandfather of Eadulf Rus.

Third, and last, Uhtred married Ælfgifu, daughter of King Æthelred the Unready. They had a daughter:

- Ealdgyth, ancestress of the Earls of Dunbar; she married Maldred, called son of 'thegn Crínán' by De obsessione Dunelmi (possibly identical to Crínán of Dunkeld, thus making Maldred brother of Duncan I of Scotland, but see Aird for modern doubts).

== Descendants ==
The killing of Uhtred by Thurbrand the Hold started a blood feud that lasted for many years and is the subject of the historical work, De obsessione Dunelmi. Uhtred's son Ealdred subsequently avenged his father by killing Thurbrand, but Ealdred in turn was killed by Thurbrand's son, Carl.

Ealdred's vengeance had to wait until the 1070s, when Waltheof II, Ealdred's grandson had his soldiers kill most of Carl's sons and grandsons. This is an example of the notorious Northumbrian blood feuds that were common at this time.

Uhtred's dynasty continued to reign in Bernicia. He was succeeded first by Ealdred, Earl of Bamburgh (killed 1038), his son by Ecgfrida, followed by another one of his sons, by Sige, Eadulf (killed 1041).

After the Norman Conquest, Eadulf's son Osulf briefly held the earldom of northern Northumbria in 1067 until he too was killed, succeeded by Uhtred's grandson by his third marriage (and Osulf's uncle), Gospatric, who was Earl of Northumbria from 1068 to 1072 before being forced to flee to Scotland. His replacement was Ealdred's maternal grandson, Waltheof II, who was deprived and in 1076 executed for treason. The murder of his Norman replacement, Walcher, Bishop of Durham, by Uhtred's descendant Eadulf Rus led William the Conqueror to send an army northwards to harry the region again. In Scotland, Earl Gospatric's descendants held the Earldom of Dunbar for centuries.

== In popular culture ==
Author Bernard Cornwell was inspired to write his series The Saxon Stories after learning he was a descendant of Uhtred the Bold, who is the inspiration behind the series protagonist Lord Uhtred of Bebbanburg. Several events in the series are based on events in the life of Uhtred the Bold, such as the siege of Bebbanburg by the Scots and the severed heads on poles; however, unlike many other characters in the book series who correspond closely to historical figures, such as Alfred the Great, Guthrum and King Guthred, the main character Uhtred is fictitious: he lives in the middle of the 9th century—being aged about ten at the battle of York (867)—more than a hundred years before the historical Uhtred the Bold. This fictitious Lord Uhtred of Bebbanburg is the protagonist in the television series The Last Kingdom and the movie The Last Kingdom: Seven Kings Must Die, which are based on The Saxon Stories.

Adrian Mourby's two radio plays, The Corsaint (c. 1986), and its sequel, The King of the North Rides his Horse through the Sky (1992), provide dramatic realisations of the story of the siege of Durham and the severed heads on poles as told about the historical Uhtred. They were broadcast by BBC Radio 3.

== Sources ==
- Stenton, Frank M., Sir. 1971. Anglo-Saxon England. (Third edition.) Oxford University Press, ASIN 0192801392 ISBN 978-0192801395
- Fletcher, Richard. 2002. Bloodfeud: Murder and Revenge in Anglo-Saxon England. London: Allen Lane. ISBN 978-0713993912

Preceded by Waltheof	Ruler of Bamburgh c.1000–c.1018	Succeeded by Eadwulf Cudel
Preceded by Ælfhelm	Ealdorman in Northumbria; 1006–1016	Succeeded by Erik of Hlathir
