= William of Aldrie =

Anglo-Norman nobleman

William of Aldrie was a first generation Anglo-Norman and rebel. A cousin of, and steward to, William of Eu, he was executed in January 1096.

Along with his cousin, William conspired with Roger de Lacy and Robert de Mowbray to murder King William II and install the king's cousin Stephen of Aumale.

In 1095 the rebels impounded four Norwegian trading ships and refused the king's demand to return the merchandise.

King William conducted a lightning campaign, outflanking the rebels at Newcastle and capturing a rebel stronghold at Morpeth. He besieged the rebels at Bamburgh Castle and built a castle facing the existing one.

In January 1096 William II sentenced William to death by hanging. Execution of those of high social standing was extremely unusual at the time. It was a measure of the growing strength of William II's kingship from his initially weak position that he felt able to act in this high-handed manner.
