= Aubrey de Coucy =

Earl of Northumbria

Aubrey de Coucy (a.k.a. Alberic) was the Earl of Northumbria from 1080 until about 1086.

Aubrey de Coucy was a Norman from Coucy-le-Château-Auffrique, Aisne which was the inheritance of his wife, Ada, daughter of Letétard de Marle (himself a son of Count Ivo de Beaumont-sur-Oise). In 1080, Walcher, Bishop of Durham and earl of Northumbria, was murdered in Gateshead during a feud between his household knights and the old Northumbrian aristocracy. William the Conqueror then gave the earldom to Aubrey, a Norman baron from Coucy with large possessions in the Midlands.

However, de Coucy soon resigned, probably shortly after a threat of Danish invasion in 1085. He is listed as a tenant in the Domesday Book of 1086, but the notices suggest that he had recently forfeited his English possessions. According to the chronicler Symeon of Durham, de Coucy, "being of very little use in difficult affairs, returned to his country"; Robert de Mowbray was then given the earldom. When King William was dying at Rouen in 1087, he decided that his eldest son, Robert Curthose, would be allowed to succeed in Normandy, but not in England, and de Coucy was sent to tell Robert the news.

De Coucy died at his Château de Coucy. His sister Ermengarde had warned him of a plot to kill him by an Engeran who, according to the Vita Sancti Arnulfi (AASS Aug. 11, p. 240), subsequently became his widow's second husband.

Peerage of England
Preceded by Walcher	Earl of Northumbria; 1080–1086	Succeeded by Robert de Mowbray
