= Eadred (bishop) =

11th-century Bishop of Durham

- Bishop of Durham
- Appointed: c. 1040
- Installed: never enthroned
- Term ended: 1042
- Predecessor: Edmund
- Successor: Æthelric

Personal details
- Died: 1042

Eadred (died 1042) was Bishop of Durham in around 1040. He had been the head of the cathedral chapter when the previous bishop, Edmund, died. Eadred is said to have taken money from the cathedral funds and purchased the office of bishop from the king. Symeon of Durham states that because of the sin of simony, Eadred died before he could be enthroned as bishop.

== Citations ==
Christian titles
Preceded by Edmund	Bishop of Durham c. 1040-1042	Succeeded by Æthelric
