= Edmund of Durham =

11th-century Bishop of Durham

Edmund
- Bishop of Durham
- Appointed: 1020
- Term ended: 1041
- Predecessor: Aldhun
- Successor: Eadred
- Other post: monk

Personal details
- Died: 1041 Gloucester

Edmund (or Eadmund; died 1041) was Bishop of Durham from 1021 to 1041.

Symeon of Durham relates the story that Edmund was a monk of Durham Cathedral, and that he was chosen as bishop because a strange voice that came from the tomb of Saint Cuthbert insisted that Edmund be selected as the next bishop. His election was confirmed by King Cnut of England. Edmund died while visiting the English royal court at Gloucester in 1041.

== Citations ==
Christian titles
| Preceded by Aldhun | Bishop of Durham; 1020–1041 | Succeeded by Eadred |
