= Ealdred II of Bamburgh =

English earl (died 1038)

Ealdred was an Earl in north-east England from the death of his uncle, Eadwulf Cudel, soon after 1018 until his murder in 1038. He is variously described by historians as Earl of Northumbria, Earl of Bernicia (northern Northumbria) and Earl of Bamburgh, his stronghold on the Northumbrian coast. He was the son of Uhtred, Earl of Northumbria, who was murdered by Thurbrand the Hold in 1016 with the connivance of Cnut. Ealdred's mother was Ecgfrida, daughter of Aldhun, bishop of Durham.

== Historic Blood Feud ==
Some time probably in the mid 1020s Ealdred killed Thurbrand in revenge for his father's death. In 1038 Ealdred was murdered by Thurbrand's son. There were several other revenge murders in what was described by Frank Stenton as "the most remarkable private feud in English history". Richard Fletcher gives an account in his book Bloodfeud: Murder and Revenge in Anglo-Saxon England. Ealdred was succeeded as Earl of Bernicia by his half-brother, Eadwulf, who was murdered in 1041 by Siward, Earl of Northumbria, husband of one of Ealdred's daughters.

== Issue ==
English chronicler Simeon of Durham identifies five children of Ealdred, all daughters. Three of those daughters were all named "Ælfleda" (Ælfflaed), a common name for the time. If a child died young often the next child of the same sex was given the same name. The first two daughters of that name probably died very young, there appears to be no other record of them.

- The third daughter to be named Ælfflaed lived to adulthood and became the second wife of Siward, Earl of Northumbria. One of her sons (Ealdred's grandson) was Waltheof, Earl of Northumbria, his daughter Maud married David I of Scotland and became Queen consort of Scotland.
- A fourth daughter Ealdgyth (Algitha) married Ligulf, who was murdered in 1080. Before his death they had two sons: Uhtred and Morcar.
- A fifth daughter Etheldreda (Etheldritha) married Orm, son of Gamel, identified in the Domesday Book as owner of 61 properties in Yorkshire, they had children.

== Sources ==
- Aird, William M. (2004). "Ligulf". Oxford Dictionary of National Biography (online ed.). Oxford University Press. doi:10.1093/ref:odnb/16791. (Subscription, Wikipedia Library access or UK public library membership required.)
- Fletcher, Richard (2003). Bloodfeud: Murder and Revenge in Anglo-Saxon England. London, UK: Penguin Books. ISBN 978-0-14-028692-2.
- Stenton, Frank (1971). Anglo-Saxon England (3rd ed.). Oxford University Press. ISBN 978-0-19-280139-5.
- Williams, Ann (1991). "Ælfflæd queen d. after 920". In Williams, Ann; Smyth, Alfred P.; Kirby, D. P. (eds.). A Biographical Dictionary of Dark Age Britain. London, UK: Seaby. ISBN 1-85264-047-2.

Preceded by Eadulf III	Ruler of Bamburgh; 1019–1038	Succeeded by Eadulf IV
