= Rulers of Bamburgh =

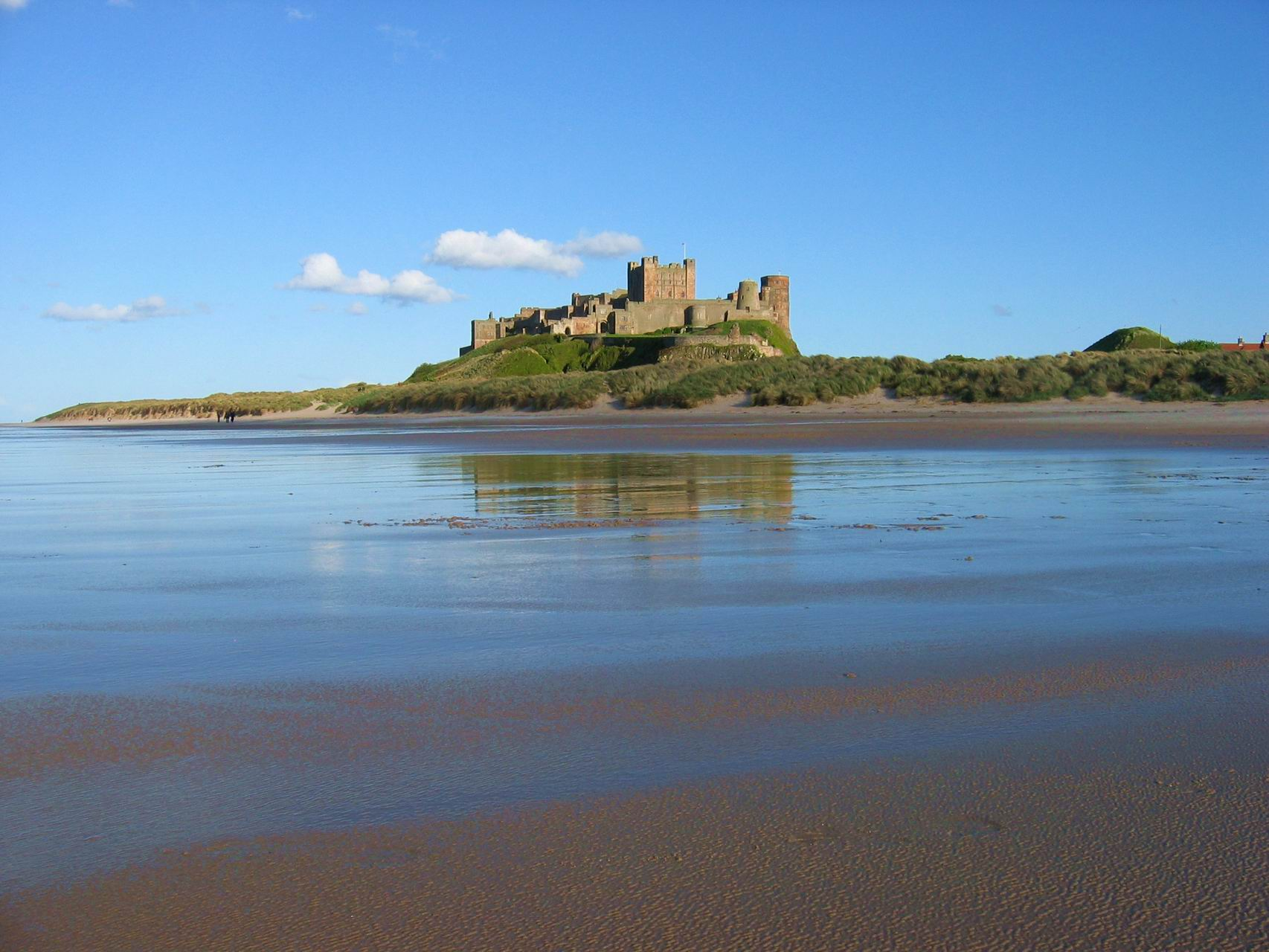
The current castle at Bamburgh.

The Rulers of Bamburgh (Old English: Bebbanburh; Old Irish: Dún Guaire; Brittonic: Din Guairoi) were significant regional potentates in what is now northern England and south-eastern Scotland during the Viking Age. Sometimes referred to in modern sources as the Earldom of Bamburgh, their polity existed for roughly two centuries, beginning after the attacks on the Anglo-Saxon Kingdom of Northumbria by the Vikings in the later ninth century, and ending after the Norman Conquest later in the eleventh century. However in that time substantial land was lost to Scotland (Lothian and possibly Tweeddale) and the Strathclyde Welsh (Cumbria and possibly Lancashire).

In Scottish and Irish sources of the period the Bamburgh 'earldom' is referred to as the kingship of the Northern English (or the North English kingdom), or simply of the 'Saxons'.

In essence, Bamburgh and the surrounding region (the former realm of Bernicia), the northern component of Northumbria, was ruled in succession by a shadowy series of 'kings', 'earls' (Latin duces) and 'high-reeves' (from Old English heah-gerefa). Most of these were descended from Eadwulf I of Bamburgh, thereafter called the Eadwulfings or House of Bamburgh. Several of these men commanded the whole of Northumbria, and their jurisdiction is also sometimes referred to also as the earldom of Northumbria (not to be confused with the southerly 'official' ealdordom of Northumbria based at York).

Although their domains were to an extent reintegrated into Northumbria when the Viking holdings in Yorkshire were integrated into the Kingdom of England, the lands held by the rulers of Bamburgh still retained some distinctiveness within Northumbria with the House of Bamburgh often supplying earls of the combined Northumbria. This distinction continued into Norman times where the unlike the rest of Northumbria which was under Danelaw, Bamburgh lands were not included in the Domesday Book, it wasn't a part of the legal threefold division of England and there were no royal manors in the area until the suppression of Earldom.

== Post-867 Kings in English Northumbria ==
List of pre-Eadwulfing Rulers (possible or certain)
| Ruler | Known date(s) | Notes |
|---|---|---|
| Ecgbert I | c.867–c.872/3 | Reliant on twelfth-century source(s). |
| Ricsige | 872/3–876 | Reliant on twelfth-century source(s). |
| Ecgbert II | 876–878 or after 883? | Reliant on twelfth-century source(s). |
| Guthred | died 895 | A Danelaw ruler; but Historia de Sancto Cuthberto suggests his kingship extended among the English north of the Tyne, but source is late and there is no contemporary evidence for his rule in the north. |
| Osberht | fl. 901 | A figure with this name 'expelled from the kingship' in one set of Northumbrian annals for 901, witnessed in the twelfth century; but otherwise unknown. |
| Eardwulf | fl. c.899 x 924 | A princeps of the region named in Historia de Sancto Cuthberto for the reign of Edward the Elder, otherwise unknown. |

== Eadwulfing line or 'House of Bamburgh' ==
Eadwulfing Rulers (possible or certain)
| Ruler | Known date(s) | Known title(s) | Notes |
|---|---|---|---|
| Eadwulf I | died 913 | 'king of the Northern English'; actor ('agent') | |
| Ealdred I | fl. 927–933 | 'Ealdred son of Eadwulf of Bamburgh' (Ealdred Eadulfing from Bebbanbyrig); dux ('leader') | |
| Ealdwulf | fl. c. 927 | | Named by William of Malmesbury as person 'driven out' of Northumbria upon its subjugation by Æthelstan of England. |
| Adulf mcEtulfe | died 934 | 'king of the Northern English' | Recorded only in Irish source as Adulf mcEtulfe, which would ordinarily render 'Æthulf' or 'Æthelwulf son of Eadwulf', a figure otherwise unrecorded. It has also been suggested that Adulf here is Ealdred I, or is the rebel Ealdwulf mentioned by William of Malmesbury. |
| Oswulf I | fl. 934–954 | 'high reeve' (hæhgerefa); dux ('leader')'; 'nobleman' (eorl) | Son of Eadwulf I. Said in twelfth-century sources to have taken responsibility for the Anglo-Scandinavian regions of southern Northumbria taken by Eadred of England in 954, converted to a new ealdordom (jurisdiction governed by a West Saxon ealdorman) after Oswulf's death. |
| Eadwulf II Evil-Child | fl. 968–70 | dux | Paternity unknown. |
| Ealdred | fl. mid. 11th century | comes ('count') | Son of Oswulf I, he provides the genealogical link between Oswulf and Waltheof I, but is attested as ruler of Bamburgh only in a late source. He may be the same as Ealdred of Lindisfarne. |
| Waltheof | fl. 994 | dux | Son of Ealdred son of Oswulf I. |
| Northman | fl 994 | eorl | He is a northerner with the title of 'earl', but it is uncertain if he was ruler of Bamburgh or related to the Eadwulfing line of Bamburgh rulers. |
| Eadred | fl. c. 1000 | | Another northerner with the title of 'earl', but it is uncertain if he was ruler of Bamburgh or related to the Eadwulfing line of Bamburgh rulers. |
| Uhtred | fl. 1009–16 | dux; eorl; princeps | Son of Waltheof. After 1006 he was ealdorman of Northumbria, i.e. he governed southern Northumbria as an ealdorman, regional governor, of the English king, in addition to rulership of Bamburgh. |
| Eadwulf III Cudel | fl. c. 1020 | comes | Son of Waltheof. Known and titled only in post-Conquest sources. |
| Ealdred (II) | fl. c. 1030 | comes | Son of Uhtred. Known only in post-Conquest sources. |
| Eadwulf IV | died 1041 | eorl | Son of Uhtred. |
| Oswulf II | died 1067 | comes | Last of the Eadwuling line. |

== Post-Eadwulfing ==
Post-Eadwulfing Rulers
| Ruler | Known date(s) | Known titl(e) | Notes |
|---|---|---|---|
| Gospatric | 1067–1070s | | Son of Maldred, or Máel Doraid, son of Crínán, possibly Crínán of Dunkeld. Died at Norham in the 1070s |
| Waltheof of Northampton | died 1076 | | Son of Siward, ealdorman in southern Northumbria. May have governed part of jurisdiction or possessed nominal claim, but tenure of Bamburgh uncertain. |
| Dolfin of Carlisle | fl. 1092 | | Son of Gospatric. Tenure of Bamburgh uncertain, but expelled from region upon the Norman arrival in 1092. |
| Robert de Mowbray | dispossessed 1095 | | Norman earl in Northumbria, possessed Bamburgh by 1093 if not earlier. |

== See also ==
- Earl of Northumbria
