= Robert de Mowbray =

11th-century Norman noble

- Died: 1125
- Spouse: Matilda de l'Aigle (m. 1095)
- Relatives: Geoffrey de Montbray (uncle)
- Military career
- Conflicts: Battle of Alnwick; Rebellion of 1088

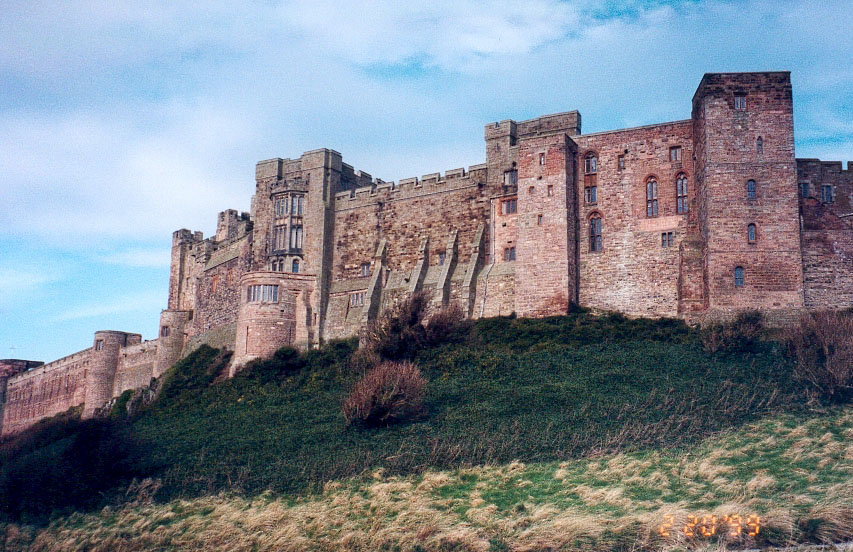
In 1095, Mowbray fled to Bamburgh Castle. Most of the visible fortifications were built later.

Robert de Mowbray (died 1125), a Norman, was Earl of Northumbria from 1086 until 1095. Robert joined the 1088 rebellion against King William II on behalf of Robert Curthose, but was pardoned and later led the army that killed Malcolm III of Scotland at Alnwick. In 1095, he conspired to put Stephen of Aumale on the throne, was besieged by the king, and captured. As punishment, his marriage was dissolved and his lands confiscated, given to the new husband of his former wife, while Mowbray was imprisoned for life and later became a monk.

== Origin ==
Robert was the son of Roger de Mowbray and nephew of Geoffrey de Montbray, bishop of Coutances. The family name, Mowbray, is an Anglicisation derived from Montbray in Manche, Normandy.

== Earldom of Northumbria ==
Mowbray was made Earl of Northumbria after Aubrey de Coucy, the previous earl, decided that he no longer wished to remain in his post. Coucy was made earl in 1080 and, probably that same year, resigned his position and returned to Normandy, losing all of the lands that he held in England. He was not replaced until Robert was appointed in 1086. Mowbray joined his uncle, Geoffrey, in the failed rebellion of 1088 against William Rufus on behalf of Robert, duke of Normandy, but both were pardoned and Mowbray remained in his post as Earl of Northumbria. In November 1093, Malcolm III of Scotland invaded Northumbria for the second time since 1091, and attacked Alnwick. Mowbray raised an army and attacked the Scots, taking them by surprise on 13 November (St Brice's Day). In the ensuing Battle of Alnwick, Malcolm and his son Edward were slain. Earlier that same year, Geoffrey de Montbray died and Mowbray succeeded to his uncle's large estates, becoming one of the most powerful barons in the kingdom. Mowbray married in 1095 Matilda, daughter of Richer de l'Aigle, and niece of Hugh d'Avranches, 1st Earl of Chester.

== Rebellion and downfall ==
In 1095 Mowbray took part in a rebellion which had for its object the transference of the crown from the sons of the Conqueror to Stephen of Aumale. It appears that there was a conspiracy that included several barons, but that when the time came for action most of the conspirators abandoned the scheme leaving Mowbray and his fellow conspirator William of Eu exposed. The incident that brought the matter to a head was Mowbray seizing four Norwegian vessels lying in the Tyne. The merchants who owned the vessels complained to the king and Mowbray was commanded to attend the Curia Regis to explain his actions. Mowbray did not attend and ignored further summonses, so that William finally led an army against him. Mowbray shut himself up in his stronghold, Bamburgh Castle. William laid siege to Bamburgh and built a temporary siege castle alongside it, known as Malvoisin, or "evil neighbour". For some reason, during the siege, Mowbray left the castle with a small force of knights and was pursued by his besiegers, being forced to take refuge in Tynemouth. After a siege of six days he was wounded in the leg, captured and was taken back to Bamburgh where his wife was still resisting the besiegers. She finally surrendered the castle after the besiegers threatened to blind her husband.

== Imprisonment and death ==
As a result of his part in the rebellion Mowbray forfeited his estates and was imprisoned for life, initially at Windsor Castle. He spent many years in prisons, "growing old without offspring", according to the chronicler, Florence of Worcester, and then was allowed to become a monk at St Albans Abbey, according to another chronicler Orderic Vitalis. Mowbray's fellow conspirators, William of Eu and William of Aldrie, received harsher punishment, William of Eu being castrated and blinded, and William of Aldrie being condemned to death.

== Legacy ==
Orderic Vitalis gives the following description of Mowbray: "Powerful, rich, bold, fierce in war, haughty, he despised his equals and, swollen with vanity, disdained to obey his superiors. He was of great stature, strong, swarthy and hairy. Daring and crafty, stern and grim, he was given more to meditation than speech, and in conversation scarce ever smiled".

Mowbray's wife, Matilda, was granted an annulment of her marriage by Pope Paschal II on the basis of consanguinity, and sometime after 1107 she became the wife of a kinsman of her former husband, Nigel d'Aubigny, who was also granted the lands in Montbray forfeited by her former husband. The couple remained childless and in 1118 d’Aubigny divorced Matilda and married Gundred de Gournay, daughter of Gerard de Gournay and Edith de Warenne. They had a son, Roger, who inherited the estates originally forfeited by Robert Mowbray. On receiving his inheritance Roger changed his name to Mowbray at the instruction of Henry I. Thus the name Mowbray was continued, but with no blood line from Robert de Mowbray.

== Sources ==
- Grundy, John (2022). History of Northumberland. Newcastle upon Tyne: Tyne Bridge Publishing. ISBN 9781838280970.

Peerage of England
Preceded by Aubrey de Coucy	Earl of Northumbria; 1086–1095	Succeeded by vacant, next held by Henry Percy, 1st Earl of Northumberland
