= Bamburgh =

Village in Northumberland, England

Coordinates: 55.604°N 1.722°W

- Village
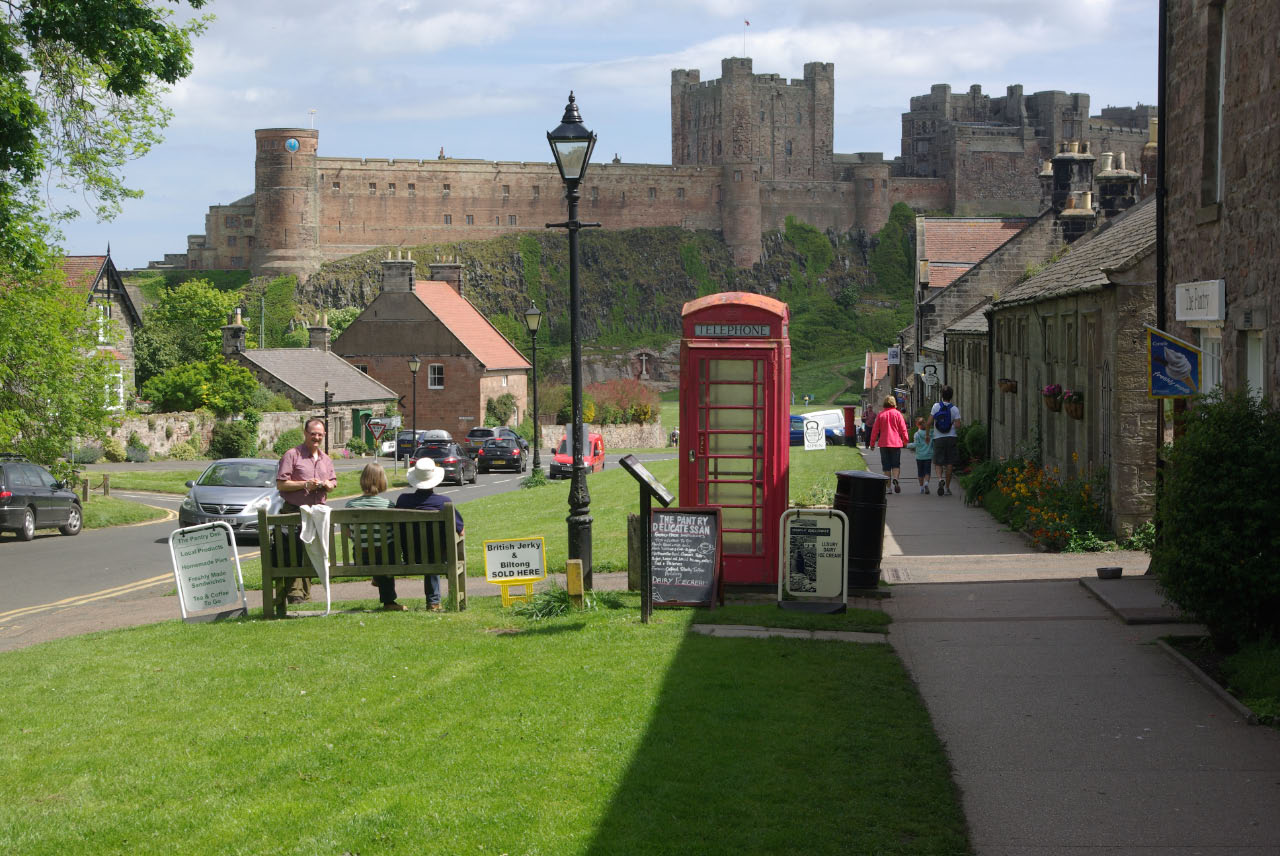

- Location within Northumberland
- Population: 414 (2011)
- OS grid reference: NU1734
- Civil parish: Bamburgh
- Unitary authority: Northumberland
- Ceremonial county: Northumberland
- Region: North East
- Country: England
- Sovereign state: United Kingdom
- Post town: BAMBURGH
- Postcode district: NE69
- Dialling code: 01668
- Police: Northumbria
- Fire: Northumberland
- Ambulance: North East
- UK Parliament: North Northumberland

Bamburgh (/ˈbæmbərə/ BAM-bər-ə) is a village and civil parish on the coast of Northumberland, England. It had a population of 454 in 2001, decreasing to 414 at the 2011 census.

Bamburgh was the centre of an independent north Northumbrian territory between 867 and 954. Bamburgh Castle was built by the Normans on the site of an Anglo-Saxon fort. The Victorian era heroine Grace Darling is buried there.

The extensive beach by the village was awarded the Blue Flag rural beach award in 2005. The Bamburgh Dunes, a Site of Special Scientific Interest, stand behind the beach. Bamburgh is popular with holidaymakers and is within the Northumberland Coast Area of Outstanding Natural Beauty.

== History ==
The site now occupied by Bamburgh Castle was previously home to a fort of the Celtic Britons known as Din Guarie and may have been the capital of the kingdom of Bernicia, the realm of the Gododdin people, from the realm's foundation in c. 420 until 547, the year of the first written reference to the castle. In that year, the citadel was captured by the Anglo-Saxon ruler Ida of Bernicia (Beornice) and became Ida's seat. The Anglo-Saxons called the place Bebbanburh, meaning "Queen Bebba's stronghold"; this was later corrupted into the modern "Bamburgh". In 593, Æthelfrith became king of Bernicia, with his capital in Bamburgh.Aidan of Lindisfarne came to this area from the monastery of Iona in 635 on behalf of King Oswald of Northumbria.

Following the defeat of Northumbrian forces by the Viking Great Heathen Army, at York in 867, the Kingdom of Northumbria disintegrated. Southern Northumbria became the Viking-ruled Kingdom of York, while north remained under Anglo-Saxon control under the high reeves of Bamburgh. The territory finally became part of the Kingdom of England in 954.

The late medieval village began to develop near the castle. During the dissolution of the monasteries the property of the friars, including the castle, was seized on behalf of Henry VIII.

Late medieval British author Thomas Malory identified Bamburgh Castle with Joyous Gard, the mythical castle home of Sir Lancelot in Arthurian legend.

Lionel Lukin's first purpose-built lifeboat was stationed here in 1786. The Royal National Lifeboat Institution re-established a lifeboat station here in 1882 but it closed in 1897.

== St Aidan's Church ==
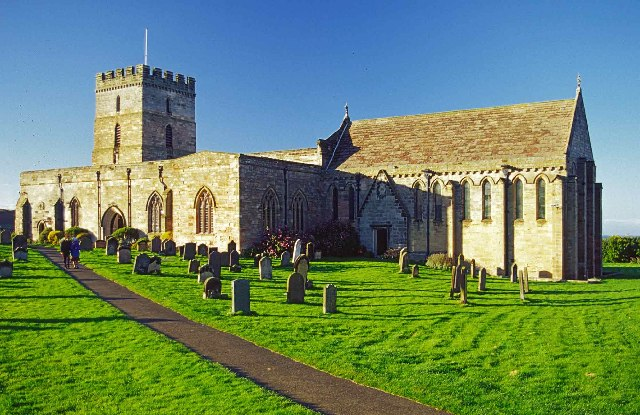
St Aidan's Church, Bamburgh

According to Bede, St Aidan built a wooden church outside the castle wall in AD 635, and he died here in AD 652. A wooden beam preserved inside the church is traditionally said to be the one on which he rested as he died. The present church dates from the late 12th century, though some pre-conquest stonework survives in the north aisle. The chancel, said to be the second-longest in the country (60 ft; 18 m), was added in 1230; it contains an 1895 reredos in Caen stone by W.S. Hicks, depicting northern saints of the 7th and 8th centuries. There is an effigy of local heroine Grace Darling in the north aisle. This formed part of the original monument to Grace Darling but was removed due to weathering of the stonework. Her memorial is sited in the churchyard in such a position that passing ships can see it.

The property has been Grade I listed since December 1969. The listing summary includes this description:

"Parish church. C12, C13 and C14. Restored 1830 and later C19. Squared stone and ashlar; chancel and north transept have stone slate roofs; other roofs not visible. West tower, nave, aisles, transepts and chancel".

After the dissolution of the monasteries in the mid-1500s, the monks were forced to leave and St Aidan's became the parish church for the village. Over the subsequent centuries there were major repairs and restorations. The church's crypt holds the remains of 110 individuals who died in the 7th and 8th centuries; they had initially been buried in the castle's Bowl Hole graveyard. The remains were found during a project between 1998 and 2007. In 2016, they were moved into the crypt. Since November 2019, the crypt can be viewed by visitors through a small gate.

== Governance ==
An electoral ward of the same name exists. This ward includes Belford and also stretches south to Ellingham with a total population taken at the 2011 census of 4,846.

== In popular culture ==
Bamburgh Castle, under its Saxon name Bebbanburg, is the ancestral home of Uhtred, the main character in Bernard Cornwell's historical 13-novel series The Saxon Stories, published 2004–2020, which was made into the BBC and Netflix five-season series The Last Kingdom 2015–2022.

Bamburgh is also featured in the open-world video game series Forza Horizon 4 released in October 2018.

Additionally, Bamburgh is featured in the Realtime Strategy video game Ancestors Legacy released in 2018.

== Notable people ==
- Æthelfrith of Northumbria
- William George Armstrong
- Joe Baker-Cresswell
- Ida of Bernicia
- Prideaux John Selby
- Grace Darling
- Uhtred the Bold

== Photo gallery ==
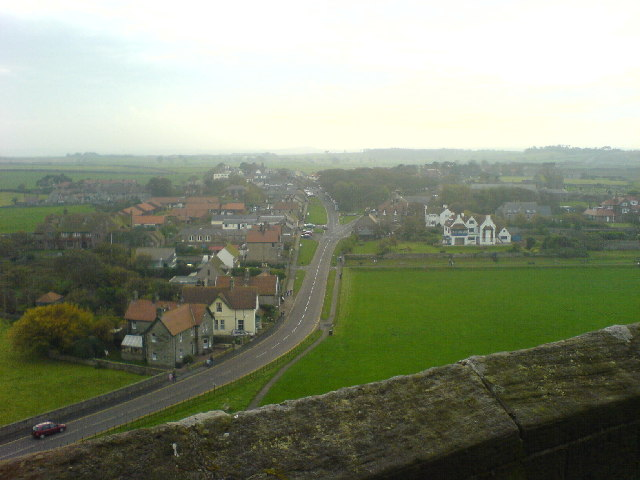
Bamburgh village and surroundings

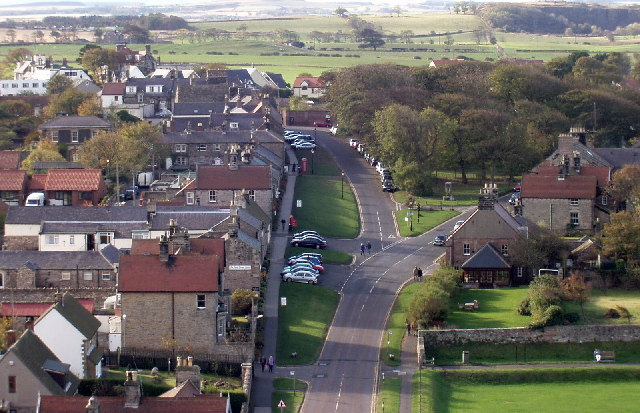
Bamburgh seen from the castle

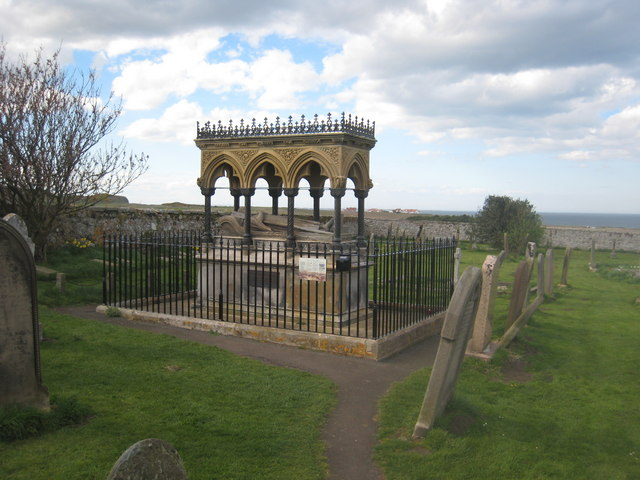
Grace Darling memorial in the churchyard

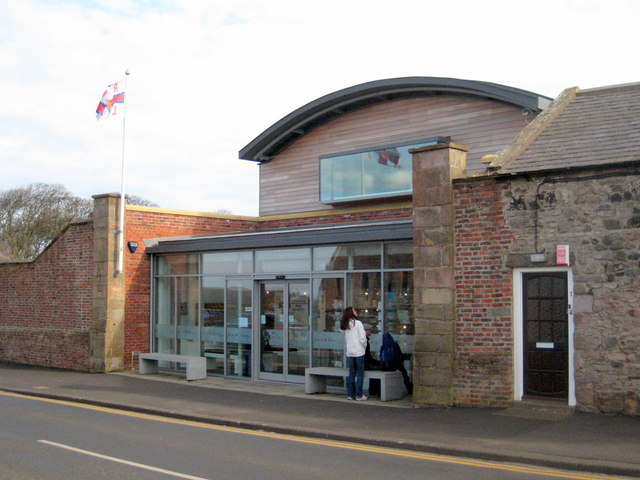
The Grace Darling Museum, opposite the church

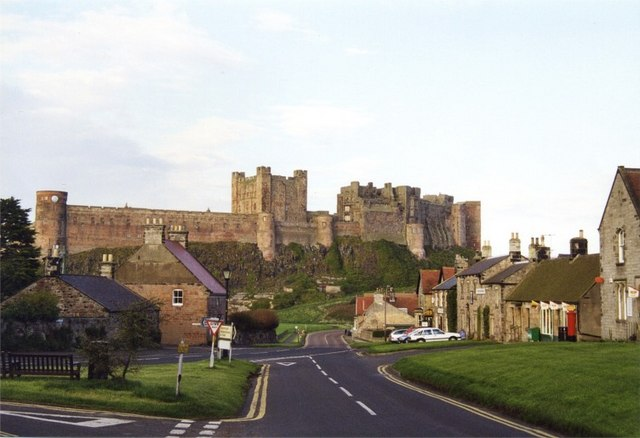
Crossroads in the village, looking towards the castle

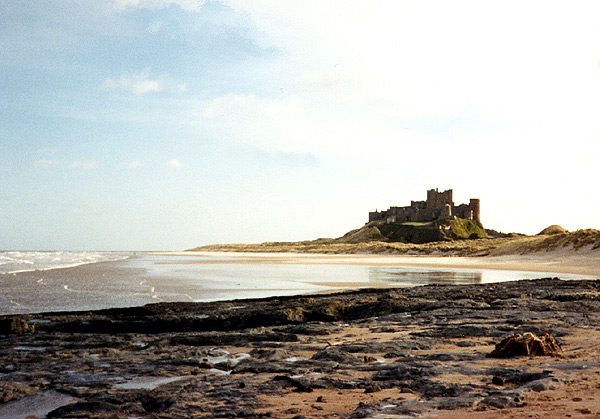
Beach and castle, looking south

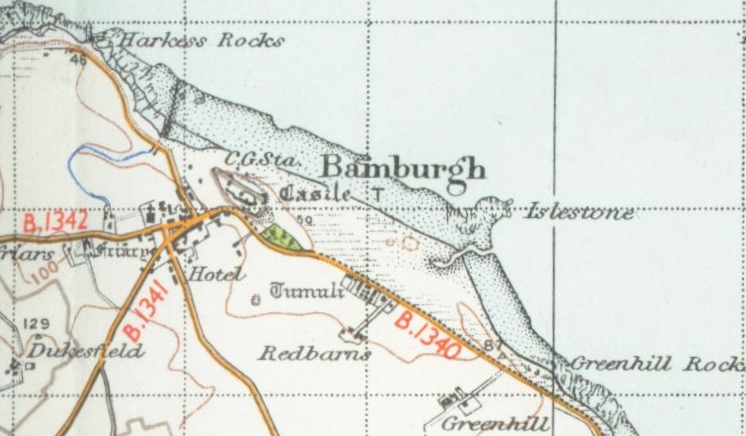
A map of Bamburgh from 1947

== See also ==
- Bamburgh Coast and Hills, a Site of Special Scientific Interest along the coast north-east of Bamburgh
- List of lighthouses in England

== Sources ==
- Grundy, John (2022). History of Northumberland. Newcastle upon Tyne: Tyne Bridge Publishing. ISBN 9781838280970.
