= Waltheof, Earl of Northumbria =

11th-century Anglo-Saxon earl of Northumbria

Saint Waltheof

Earl of Northumbria
- Reign: 1072–1076
- Predecessor: Gospatrick of Northumbria
- Successor: Walcher
- Died: 31 May 1076; St. Giles's Hill, Winchester
- Buried: Crowland Abbey
- Spouse: Judith of Lens
- Issue: Maud, Countess of Huntingdon; Adelise
- Father: Siward, Earl of Northumbria
- Mother: Ælfflaed

Waltheof, Earl of Northumbria (Middle English: Wallef, Old Norse: Valþjóf) (died 31 May 1076) was the last of the Anglo-Saxon earls and the only English aristocrat to be executed during the reign of William I.

== Early life ==
Waltheof was the second son of Siward, Earl of Northumbria. His mother was Aelfflaed, daughter of Ealdred, Earl of Bernicia, son of Uhtred, Earl of Northumbria. In 1054, Waltheof's brother, Osbeorn, who was much older than he, was killed in battle, making Waltheof his father's heir. Siward himself died in 1055, and Waltheof being far too young to succeed as Earl of Northumbria, King Edward appointed Tostig Godwinson to the earldom.

Waltheof was said to be devout and charitable and was probably educated for a monastic life. Around 1065, however, he became an earl, governing Northamptonshire and Huntingdonshire. Following the Battle of Hastings he submitted to William and was allowed to keep his pre-Conquest title and possessions. He remained at William's court until 1068.

== First revolt ==
When Sweyn II invaded Northern England in 1069, Waltheof and Edgar Aetheling joined the Danes and took part in the attack on York. He would again make a fresh submission to William after the departure of the invaders in 1070. He was restored to his earldom, and went on to marry William's niece, Judith of Lens. In 1071, he was appointed Earl of Northampton.

The Domesday Book of 1086 mentions Waltheof ("Walleff"): "'In Hallam ["Halun"], one manor with its sixteen hamlets, there are twenty-nine carucates [~14 km²] to be taxed. There Earl Waltheof had an "Aula" [hall or court]. There may have been about twenty ploughs. This land Roger de Busli holds of the Countess Judith" (Hallam, or Hallamshire, is now part of the city of Sheffield).

In 1072, William expelled Gospatric from the earldom of Northumbria. Gospatric was Waltheof's cousin and had taken part in the attack on York with him, but like Waltheof, had been pardoned by William. Gospatric fled into exile and William appointed Waltheof as the new earl. Construction of Durham Castle began under Waltheof in 1072 after receiving orders to commence this project from William. The castle would be significantly expanded by Bishop Walcher and his successors in later years.

Waltheof had many enemies in the north. Amongst them was the family of Thurbrand the Hold; Thurbrand had killed Waltheof's great-grandfather, Uhtred the Bold, starting a long-running blood-feud that had resulted in the deaths of many members of both families. In 1074, Waltheof made a decisive move by sending his retainers to ambush his rivals, succeeding in killing the two eldest of four brothers.

== Second revolt and execution ==
In 1075 Waltheof was said to have joined the Revolt of the Earls against William. His motives for taking part in the revolt are unclear, as is the depth of his involvement. Some sources say that he told his wife - the Countess Judith - about the plot and that she then informed Archbishop Lanfranc who then told her uncle William, who was at the time in Normandy. Other sources say that it was Waltheof who told the bishop of the plot. On William's return from Normandy, Waltheof was arrested, brought twice before the king's court and sentenced to death.

He spent almost a year in confinement before being beheaded on 31 May 1076 at St. Giles's Hill, near Winchester. He was said to have spent the months of his captivity in prayer and fasting. Many people believed in his innocence and were surprised when the execution was carried out. His body was initially thrown into a ditch, but was later retrieved and buried in the chapter house of Crowland Abbey in Lincolnshire. Despite confessing to his part in the rebellion, one contributing factor in his execution for treason was that his wife, and William's niece, Judith, did not like him or trust his loyalty to William.

An otherwise unknown Norse poet, Þorkell Skallason, composed a memorial poem—Valþjófsflokkr—for Waltheof, his lord. Two stanzas of this poem are preserved in Heimskringla, Hulda-Hrokkinskinna and, partially, Fagrskinna. The first of the two stanzas says that Waltheof made a hundred retainers of William burn in hot fire - "a scorching evening for the men" - and wolves ate the corpses of the Normans. The second says that William betrayed Waltheof and had him killed.

== Cult of martyrdom ==
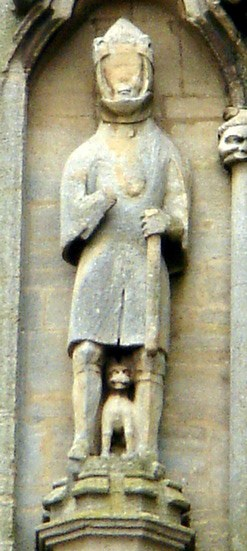
Statue traditionally identified as Waltheof, at Crowland Abbey in Lincolnshire, west front of ruined nave, 4th tier

In 1092, after a fire in the chapter house, the abbot had Waltheof's body moved to a prominent place in the abbey church. When the coffin was opened, it is reported that the corpse was found to be intact with the severed head re-joined to the trunk. This was regarded as a miracle, and the abbey, which had a financial interest in the matter began to publicise it. As a result, pilgrims began to visit Waltheof's tomb. He was commemorated on 31 August.

After a few years, healing miracles were reputed to occur in the vicinity of Waltheof's tomb, often involving the restoration of the pilgrim's lost sight. They are described in the Miracula Sancti Waldevi. Waltheof's life thus became the subject of popular media, heroic but inaccurate accounts being preserved in the Vita et Passio Waldevi comitis, a Middle English Waltheof saga, since lost, and the Anglo-Norman Roman de Waldef.

== Family and children ==
In 1070 Waltheof married Countess Judith de Lens, daughter of Lambert II, Count of Lens and Adelaide of Normandy, Countess of Aumale. Countess Judith was the niece of William the Conqueror. Waltheof and Judith had four children:

- Huctred (1070–1152), Married Bethóc only daughter and child of King Donald II of Alba.
- Maud, 2nd Countess of Huntingdon (1072–1131), the eldest, took the earldom of Huntingdon to her second husband, David I of Scotland.
- Judith of Northumbria (1074–1137)
- Alice of Northumbria (1076–1126), married the Anglo-Norman noble Raoul III of Tosny. 2nd Baron of Flamstead.

One of Waltheof's grandsons was Saint Waltheof (died 1159), abbot of Melrose.

== Sources ==
- Chronicle of Britain ISBN 1-872031-35-8
- Hunt, William (1899). "Waltheof (d.1076)" . In Lee, Sidney (ed.). Dictionary of National Biography. Vol. 58. London: Smith, Elder & Co.
- Lewis, C. P. "Waltheof, earl of Northumbria (c. 1050–1076)". Oxford Dictionary of National Biography (online ed.). Oxford University Press. doi:10.1093/ref:odnb/28646. (Subscription, Wikipedia Library access or UK public library membership required.)
- Joseph Bain, ed, Calendar of Documents relating to Scotland Preserved in Her Majesty's Public Record Office, London.(Edinburgh: H M General Register House, 1881), I:3, Digital Image Internet Archive http://thehennesseefamily.com/getperson.php?personID=I53812&tree=hennessee accessed 10 April 2021). No 13.
- Parker, Eleanor (2022). Conquered: The Last Children of Anglo-Saxon England. Bloomsbury Publishing.

Peerage of England
Preceded by Cospatrick	Earl of Northumbria; 1072–1075	Succeeded by Walcher
New title	Earl of Huntingdon and Earl of Northampton; 1072–1076	Succeeded by Vacant; Next held by: Simon I of St Liz
