= Earl of Northumbria =

Noble title in England

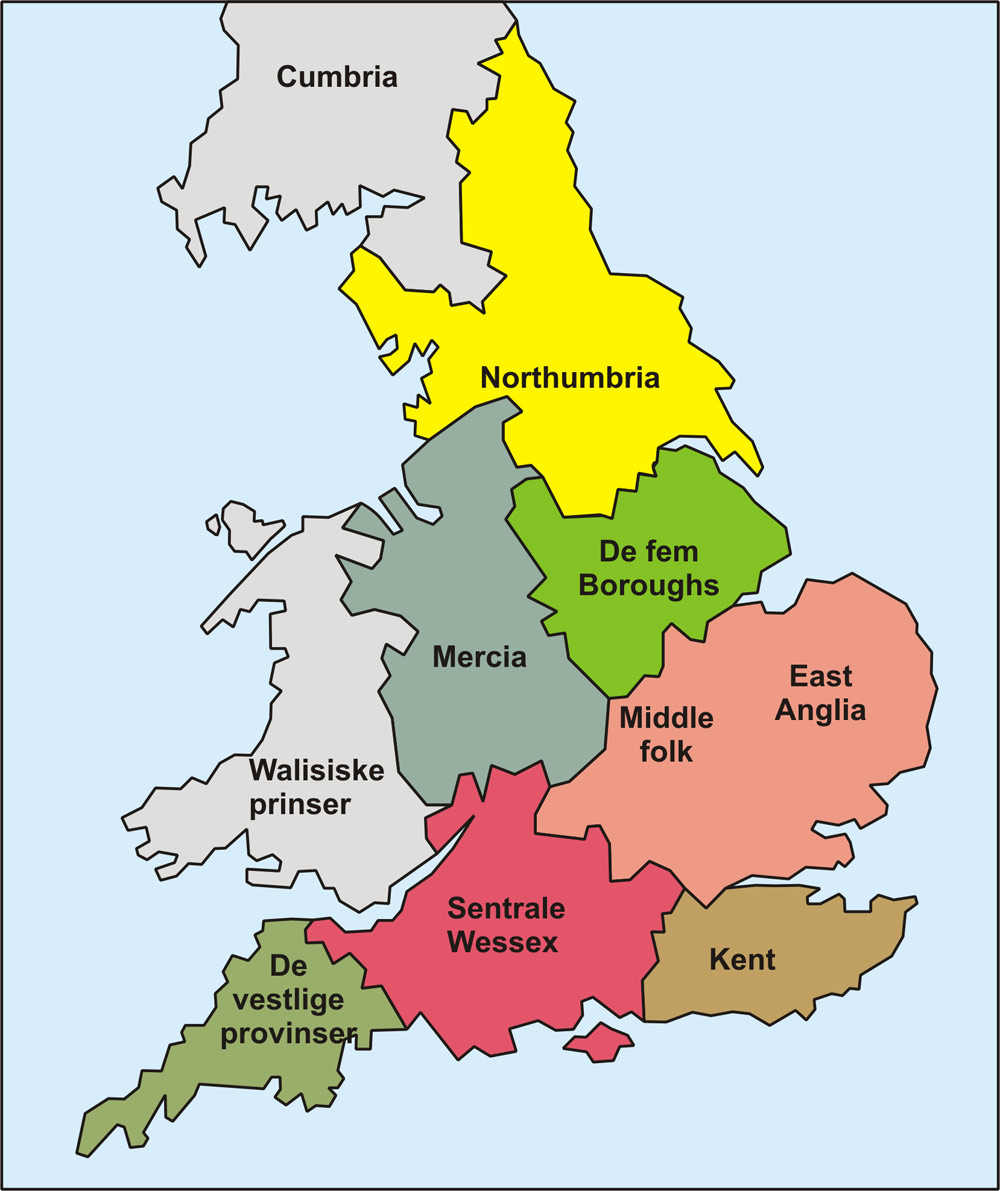
Map of earldoms of England in 1025

Earl of Northumbria or Ealdorman of Northumbria was a title in the late Anglo-Saxon, Anglo-Scandinavian and early Anglo-Norman period in England. The ealdordom was a successor of the Norse Kingdom of York.

In the seventh century, the Anglo-Saxon kingdoms of Bernicia and Deira were united in the Kingdom of Northumbria, but this was destroyed by the Vikings in 867. Southern Northumbria, the former Deira, then became the Viking kingdom of York, while the rulers of Bamburgh commanded territory to the North of the Tees, roughly equivalent to the northern kingdom of Bernicia. Scandinavian domination came to an end when Eadred's forces killed Eric Bloodaxe at the Battle of Stainmore in 954.

The whole area was then governed by earls, from the local nobility, who were appointed by the King of England to rule Northumbria in his stead. The honorific title "Earl" was Anglo-Scandinavian in origin. At the time of the Norman Conquest Northumbria was one of only seven Earldoms for all of England. The title of Earl was the highest rank below the king. In English counties Shire-Reeves would often govern a smaller area underneath the earl and where there was no earl in charge the king would appoint a Shire-Reeve to govern in his place.

In 1006 Uhtred the Bold, ruler of Bamburgh, by command of Æthelred the Unready became ealdorman in the south, temporarily re-uniting much of the area of Northumbria into a single jurisdiction. Uhtred was murdered in 1016, and Cnut then appointed Norwegian Eric of Hlathir to the Earldom of Northumbria, but Uhtred's dynasty held onto Bamburgh. Although a Scandinavian king ruled all of England, Northumbria was not well integrated into the rest of the country.

Siward became the last Scandinavian Earl of Northumbria when he succeeded Erik in about 1033. He governed for 22 years without difficulty. On Siward's death in 1055, the king of England, Edward the Confessor, chose a West Saxon to govern Yorkshire, in place of Siward's son, Waltheof. Edward's choice, Tostig Godwinson, was unpopular with locals. In 1065 Tostig was deposed by the northern nobility and replaced with Morcar (the brother of Edwin of Mercia). The northerners choice of new earl was accepted by Edward as well as by Tostig's brother Harold Godwinson.

After Edward the Confessor's death in 1066, Harold became King of England. In September 1066 Tostig, angry at Harold's betrayal, was back on the scene this time with his ally, Harald Hardrada of Norway. On 20 September 1066 the allies defeated, the northern earls, Morcar and Edwin at the Battle of Fulford although eventually they were defeated and killed, by Harold Godwinson, at the Battle of Stamford Bridge.

After the Norman Conquest the region was divided into multiple smaller baronies, one of which was the earldom of Northumberland, with others like the earldoms of York and numerous autonomous liberties such as the County Palatine of Durham and Liberty of Tynedale.

== West Saxon- and Danish-Era ealdormen ==
Ealdormen before 1066
Ruler	Accession	End	King	Notes
Oslac	963×966	975		
Thored	975×979	992x994		
Ælfhelm	c.994	1006		
Uhtred of Bamburgh	1006	1016	Æthelred the Unready	United Yorkshire with Bamburgh
Eiríkr Hákonarson	1016	1023×1033		
Siward	1023×1033	1055		
Tostig Godwinson	1055	1065	Edward the Confessor	Deposed after rebellion.
Morcar	1065	c.1068	Edward the Confessor	

== Post-Conquest ealdormen ==
Ealdormen after 1066
Ruler	Accession	End	Notes
Gospatric	c. 1068	c. 1068	Unclear if he was just ruler of Bamburgh or what if any jurisdiction he exercised south of the Tyne. Gospatric and his descendants were the forerunners of the earls of Dunbar.
Robert de Comines	1068	1069	Killed by rebels at Durham
Waltheof of Northampton	c.1070	1075	
Walcher	1075	1080	Also bishop of Durham.
Aubrey de Coucy	1080	1086	
Robert de Mowbray	c.1086×1090	1095	

== Anglo-Norman-Era baronial title ==
Scottish earls
Ruler	Accession	End	Notes
Henry of Scotland	1139	1152	
William of Scotland	1152	1157	Title and holdings confiscated by Henry II of England. Later Purchased by Hugh de Puiset, the Bishop of Durham in 1189, and held until 1191 or so.

== See also ==
- List of monarchs of Northumbria
- Rulers of Bamburgh
- Earl of York
- Earl of Northumberland

== Sources ==
- Aird, William M. (2004). "Gospatric, earl of Northumbria (d. 1073x5)". Oxford Dictionary of National Biography. Oxford University Press. doi:10.1093/ref:odnb/11110. (subscription, Wikipedia Library access or UK public library membership required)
- Barlow, Frank (1988). The Feudal Kingdom of England 1042–1216 (Fourth ed.). New York: Longman. ISBN 0-582-49504-0.
- Bartlett, Robert (2000). J.M.Roberts (ed.). England Under the Norman and Angevin Kings 1075 -1225. London: OUP. ISBN 978-0-19-925101-8.
- Campbell, James (1991). Campbell, James (ed.). The Anglo Saxons. London: Penguin. ISBN 978-0-140-14395-9.
- Carpenter, David (2004). The Struggle for Mastery : Britain 1066-1284. London: Penguin. ISBN 0-140-14824-8.
- Dalton, Paul; et al. (2002). Conquest, Anarchy and Lordship: Yorkshire, 1066–1154. Cambridge, England: Cambridge University Press. ISBN 0-521-52464-4.
- Hey, David (1986). Yorkshire from AD1000. London: Longman. ISBN 0-582-49211-4.
- James, Jeffrey (2013). The Onslaught of Spears. Stroud: The History Press. ISBN 978-0-7524-8872-1.
- Morris, Marc (2012). The Norman Conquest: The Battle of Hastings and the Fall of Anglo-Saxon England. ISBN 978-1-4481-3602-5.
- Pierce, Marc (2010). Robert E. Bjork (ed.). Jarl. The Oxford Dictionary of the Middle Ages. Oxford United Press. ISBN 978-0-19-866262-4.
