= Harrying of the North =

Military campaign in England, 1069–1070

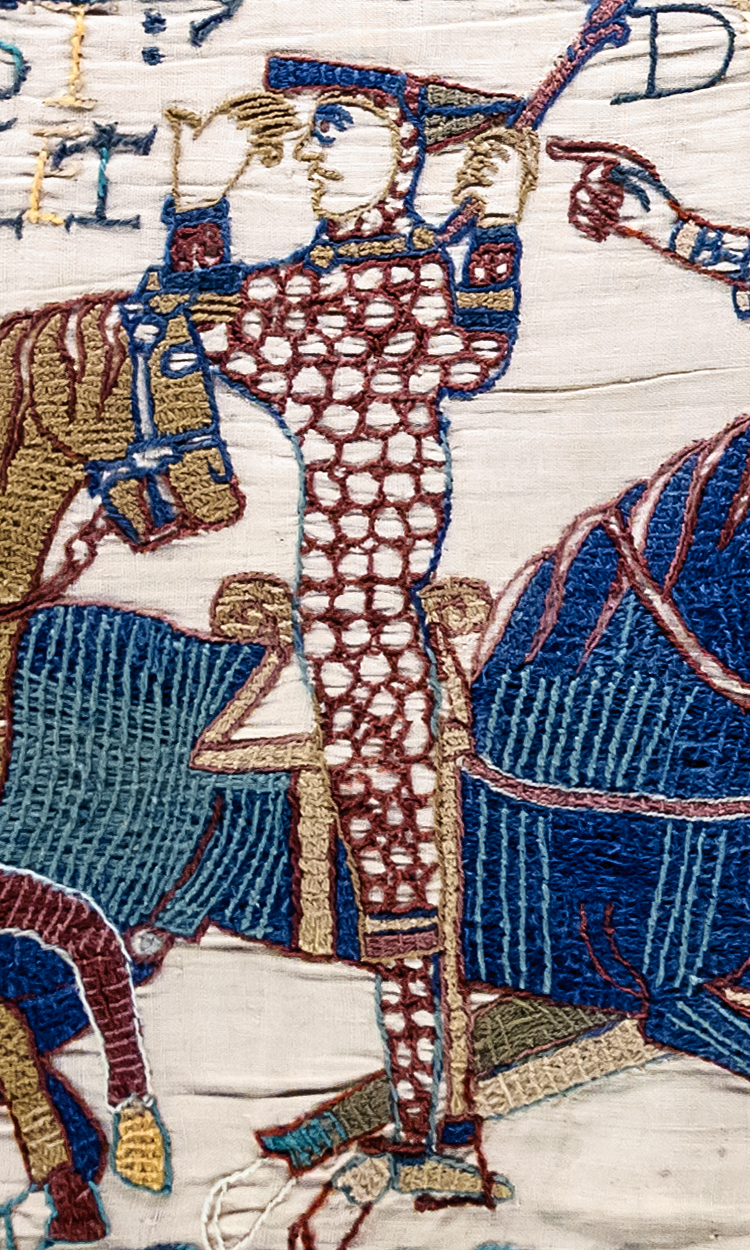
William the Conqueror as depicted in the Bayeux Tapestry

The Harrying of the North was a series of military campaigns waged by William the Conqueror in the winter of 1069–1070 to subjugate Northern England, where the presence of the last Wessex claimant, Edgar Ætheling, had encouraged Anglo-Saxon Northumbrian, Anglo-Scandinavian and Danish rebellions. William paid the Danes to go home, but the remaining rebels refused to meet him in battle, and he decided to starve them out by laying waste to the northern shires using scorched earth tactics, especially in the historic county of Yorkshire (Note: Before 1086 the area described as Eurvicscire (Yorkshire) in the Domesday book contained Amounderness, Cartmel, Furness, Kendall, parts of Copeland, Lonsdale and Cravenshire (modern Lancashire north of the Ribble and parts of Cumberland and Westmorland)) and the city of York, before relieving the local aristocracy of their positions, and installing Norman aristocrats throughout the region.

Contemporary chronicles vividly record the savagery of the campaign, the huge scale of the destruction and the widespread famine caused by looting, burning and slaughtering. Some present-day scholars have labelled the campaigns a genocide, although others doubt whether William could have assembled enough troops to inflict so much damage and have suggested that the records may have been exaggerated or misinterpreted. Records from the Domesday Book of 1086 suggest that as much as 75% of the population could have died or never returned.

== Background ==
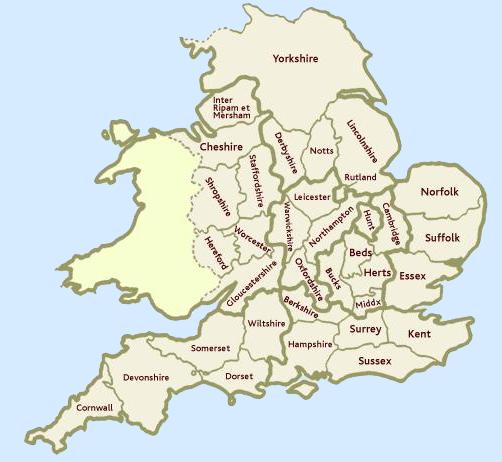
English counties as documented in the Domesday Book of 1086. (Note: The area north of Yorkshire was not conquered by William I; it was his successor, William Rufus who took control of what is now Cumbria, Cumberland and Westmorland in 1092.) At the time of the Norman Conquest, the counties north of Yorkshire had not been conquered. Yorkshire in 1086 was larger than it is now.

At the time of the Norman Conquest, the earldom of Northumbria differed from much of the rest of the Kingdom of England in its geography, political traditions and cultural identity. The region retained strong Anglo-Scandinavian influences and was governed through powerful regional earls who exercised considerable authority on behalf of the English crown. Combined with difficult communications with southern England and close political ties across the North Sea and with Scotland, these factors made the region particularly difficult for William to bring under effective royal control.

The population of the north in the eleventh century, particularly in modern Yorkshire, can be described as "Anglo-Scandinavian" carrying a cultural continuity from a mixing of Viking and Anglo-Saxon traditions during the time of Scandinavian dominance in York. The dialect of English spoken in Yorkshire may well have been different to people from the south of England, and the aristocracy south of the Tees (an area roughly analogous to modern day Yorkshire) was partly Danish in origin.

Geographically, "the North" was separated from the rest of England by natural barriers such as the river Humber and consisted of what became Yorkshire, Durham, and Northumberland in the east and Lancashire with the southern parts of Cumberland and Westmorland in the west. As well as the terrain the poor state of the roads also made communication between the north and south difficult. The more popular route between York and the south was by ship. In 962 Edgar the Peaceful had granted legal autonomy to the northern earls of the Danelaw in return for their loyalty; this had limited the powers of the Anglo-Saxon kings who succeeded him north of the Humber, particularly with tax. Efforts by the Wessex born earl Tostig to bring the tax closer to English levels led to the Northumbrian Revolt of 1065 that deposed him. The Anglo-Saxon earldom of Northumbria bordering the Danelaw stretched from the Tees to the Tweed.

The northern frontier with the Kingdom of Scotland was permeable and changeable in a way England's south coast was not. Scottish kings had long intervened in the politics of Northumbria, while English exiles and rival claimants could readily seek refuge at the Scottish court. Similarly a powerful Earl of Northumbria could affect politics in Scotland, with Earl Siward deposing Macbeth.

== Norman Conquest ==
After the defeat of the English army and death of Harold Godwinson at the Battle of Hastings, English resistance to the conquest was centred on Edgar Ætheling, the grandson of Edmund Ironside. Ironside was half-brother to Edward the Confessor. It is said the English conceded defeat not at Hastings but at Berkhamsted two months later when Edgar and his supporters submitted to William in December 1066. However, of all the men who submitted to William at Berkhamsted it was only Ealdred, Archbishop of York, who would remain loyal to the Norman king. William faced a series of rebellions and border skirmishes in Dover, Exeter, Hereford, Nottingham, Durham, York and Peterborough.

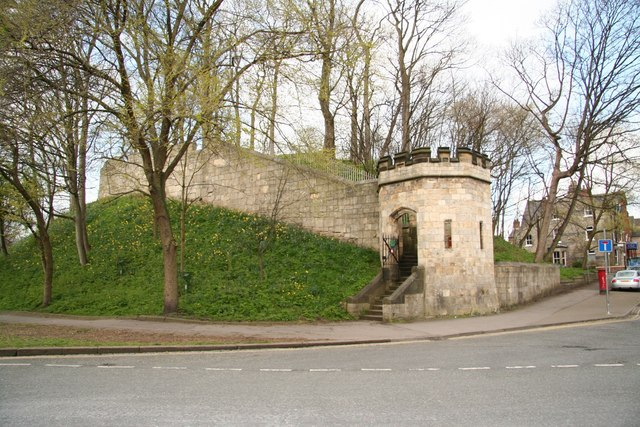
Remains of the motte (1068–69) at Baile Hill, topped by the later York city walls.

Copsi, a supporter of Tostig (a previous Anglo-Saxon earl of Northumbria who had been banished by Edward the Confessor), was a native of Northumbria and his family had a history of being rulers of Bernicia, and at times Northumbria. Copsi had fought in Harald Hardrada's army with Tostig, against Harold Godwinson at the Battle of Stamford Bridge in 1066. He had managed to escape after Harald's defeat. When Copsi offered homage to William at Barking in 1067, William rewarded him by making him earl of Northumbria. After just five weeks as earl, Copsi was murdered by Osulf, son of Earl Eadwulf IV of Bernicia. When, in turn, the usurping Osulf was also killed, his cousin, Gospatric, bought the earldom from William. He was not long in power before he joined Edgar Ætheling in rebellion against William in 1068.

With two earls murdered and one changing sides, William decided to intervene personally in Northumbria. He marched north and arrived in York during the summer of 1068. The opposition melted away, with some of them – including Edgar – taking refuge at the court of the King Malcolm III of Scotland.

Back in Northumbria, William changed tactics and appointed a Flemish mercenery, Robert de Comines, as earl, rather than an Anglo-Saxon. Despite warnings from Bishop Ethelwin that a rebel army was mobilised against him, Robert rode into Durham with a party of men on 28 January 1069, where he and his men were surrounded and slaughtered. The rebels then turned their attention to York where they killed the guardian of the castle there plus a large number of his men William's response was swift and brutal: he returned to York where he fell on the besiegers, killing or putting them to flight.

Possibly emboldened by the fighting in the north, rebellions broke out in other parts of the country. William sent earls to deal with problems in Dorset, Shrewsbury and Devon, while he dealt with rebels in the Midlands and Stafford. Edgar Ætheling had sought assistance from King Sweyn II of Denmark, who claimed that he had been promised the English throne by Edward the Confessor. Sweyn assembled a fleet of ships under the command of his sons. The fleet sailed up the east coast of England raiding as they went. The Danes with their English allies retook the city of York. Then, in the winter of 1069, William marched his army from Nottingham to York with the intention of engaging the rebel army. However, by the time William's army had reached York, the rebel army had fled, with Edgar returning to Scotland. As they had nowhere suitable on land to stay for the winter, the Danes decided to go back to their ships in the Humber estuary. William agreed to pay them a danegeld to return home without a fight. William then turned to the rebels. As they were not prepared to meet his army in pitched battle, he employed a strategy that would attack the rebel army's sources of support and their food supply.

== Campaign ==
William's strategy, implemented during the winter of 1069–70 (he spent Christmas 1069 in York), has been described by William E. Kapelle and some other modern scholars as an act of genocide. (Note: For a modern definition of genocide and an opinion on whether the Harrying of the North would class as genocide see Moses 2008, pp. 5, 28) Contemporary biographers of William consider it to be his cruellest act and a "stain upon his soul". Writing about the Harrying of the North over 50 years later, the Anglo-Norman chronicler Orderic Vitalis wrote (paraphrased):

The King stopped at nothing to hunt his enemies. He cut down many people and destroyed homes and land. Nowhere else had he shown such cruelty. This made a real change. To his shame, William made no effort to control his fury, punishing the innocent with the guilty. He ordered that crops and herds, tools and food be burned to ashes. More than 100,000 people perished of starvation. I have often praised William in this book, but I can say nothing good about this brutal slaughter. God will punish him.

— Vitalis 1853, p. 28

The land was ravaged on either side of William's route north from the River Aire. His army destroyed crops and settlements and forced rebels into hiding. By January 1070 he split his army into smaller units and sent them out to burn, loot, and terrify. From the Humber to the Tees, William's men burnt whole villages and slaughtered the inhabitants. Food stores and livestock were destroyed so that anyone surviving the initial massacre would succumb to starvation over the winter.

Florence of Worcester writing in the 12th century states:

[King William] assembled an army, and hastened into Northumbria, giving way to his resentment; and spent the whole winter in laying waste the country, slaughtering the inhabitants, and inflicting every sort of evil, without cessation.

— Florence of Worcester 1854, p. 173

There are credible reports of survivors being reduced to cannibalism. In the early 12th century Symeon of Durham wrote:

... so great a famine prevailed that men, compelled by hunger, devoured human flesh, that of horses, dogs, and cats, and whatever custom abhors; others sold themselves to perpetual slavery, so that they might in any way preserve their wretched existence.

— Symeon of Durham 1855, p. 551

Refugees from the harrying are mentioned as far away as Worcestershire in the Evesham Abbey chronicle. (Note: For an analysis of the medieval chroniclers' view of the Harrying of the North, see S. J. Speights, "Violence and the creation of socio-political order in post conquest Yorkshire", in Halsalls. Violence and Society in the Early Medieval West (Chapter 8)) Other refugees fled to lowland Scotland.

In 1086, Yorkshire still had large areas of waste territory. The Domesday Book entries indicate wasteas est or hoc est vast ("it is wasted") for estate after estate; 60% of all holdings were waste, and 66% of all villages contained wasted manors. Even the prosperous areas of the county had lost 60% of its value compared to 1066. Only 25% of the population and plough teams remained with a reported loss of 80,000 oxen and 150,000 people. The Domesday Book records a drastic decline in land values between 1066 and 1086, for Yorkshire, and between 1086 and 1100 there was a corresponding drop in the value of the land for tax purposes.

The drop in value of Yorkshire estates between 1066 and 1086 according to the Domesday Book
| Tenant-in-chief | Value of estates in 1066 (£) | Value of estates in 1086 (£) |
|---|---|---|
| Hugh earl of Chester | 260.0 | 10.5 |
| Robert count of Mortain | 239.3 | 33.4 |
| Count Alan of Brittany | 211.7 | 80.2 |
| Robert and Berengar of Tosny | 21.3 | 21.0 |
| Ilbert of Lacy | 313.3 | 159.9 |
| Roger of Bully | 134.1 | 76.5 |
| Robert Malet | 29.6 | 9.3 |
| William of Warrenne | 18.0 | 40.0 |
| William of Percy | 91.9 | 54.8 |
| Drogo de la Beuvriè | 553.8 | 93.3 |
| Ralph of Mortemer | 22.5 | 10.0 |
| Ralh Paynel | 22.0 | 5.1 |
| Geoffrey de la Guerche | 4.0 | 1.5 |
| Geoffrey Alselin | 16.0 | 4.5 |
| Walter of Aincourt | 6.0 | 2.0 |
| Gilbert of Gant | 12.0 | 3.0 |
| Gilbert Tison | 47.4 | 26.6 |
| Richard FitzArnfastr | 5.5 | 3.2 |
| Hugh FitzBaldric | 96.5 | 7.4 |
| Erneis of Burun | 23.7 | 10.8 |
| Osbern of Arches | 53.5 | 23.2 |
| Odo the Crossbowman | 4.5 | 4.8 |
| Aubrey of Coucy | 5.5 | 3.0 |
| Gospatric | 19.6 | 9.7 |
| Roger the Poitevin | ? | ? |
Sources: Palmer and Slater, The Yorkshire Domesday Book; Dalton, Conquest, Anarchy and Lordship, p. 298

Independent archaeological evidence supports the massive destruction and displacement of people. Archaeologist Richard Ernest Muir wrote that there was evidence for the "violent disruption [that] took place in Yorkshire in 1069–71, in the form of hoards of coins which were buried by the inhabitants."

== Legacy ==
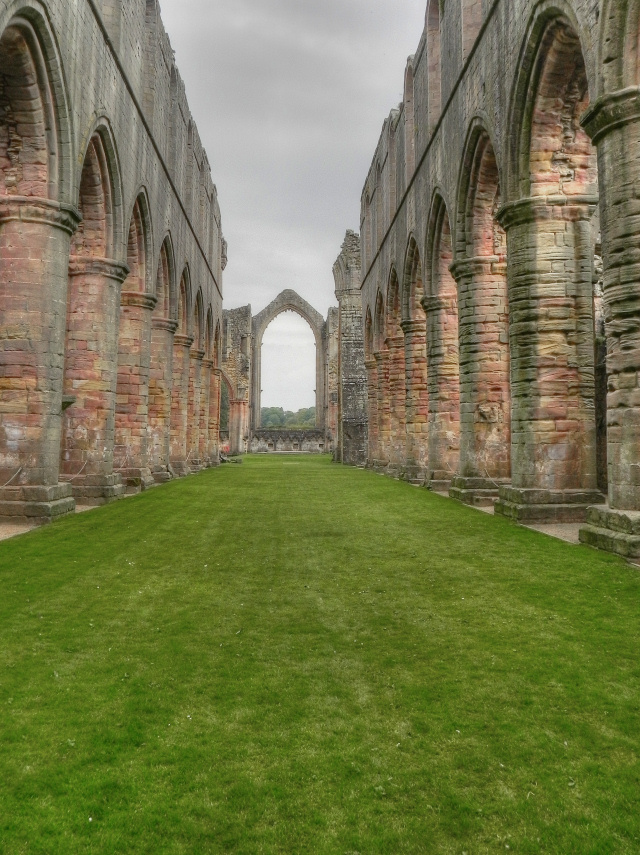
Fountains Abbey, Yorkshire. A ruined Cistercian monastery, founded in the 12th century.

B. K. Roberts in his book The Making of the English Village, suggests the reason that large numbers of villages have been laid out in regular pattern in Durham and Yorkshire was through a restructuring at a single point in time, as opposed to natural settlement growth. He goes on to say that it is highly unlikely that such plans could have resulted from piecemeal additions and must have been necessary after the Harrying of the North. The dating is thought to be secure as it is known that Norman lords used similar regular plans in founding new towns in the 'plantation' of rural settlements in other conquered parts of the British Isles.

In 1076 William appointed another Earl of Northumbria. This time it was Walcher, a Lotharingian, who had been appointed the first non-English Bishop of Durham in 1071. Having effectively subdued the population, William carried out a complete replacement of Anglo-Saxon leaders with Norman ones in the north. The new aristocracy in England was predominantly of Norman extraction; however, one exception was that of Alan Rufus, a trusted Breton lord, who obtained in 1069–1071 a substantial fiefdom in north Yorkshire, which the Domesday Book calls "the Hundred of the Land of Count Alan", later known as Richmondshire. Here Alan governed, as it were, his own principality: the only location held by the king in this area was Ainderby Steeple on its eastern edge, while Robert of Mortain held one village on its southern fringe; the other Norman lords were excluded, whereas Alan retained the surviving Anglo-Danish lords or their heirs. Alan also exercised patronage in York, where he founded St Mary's Abbey in 1088. By 1086 Alan was one of the richest and most powerful men in England.

King Malcolm III of Scotland married the Edgar Ætheling's sister, Margaret, in 1071. Edgar sought Malcolm's assistance in his struggle against William. The marriage profoundly affected the history of both England and Scotland. The influence of Margaret and her sons brought about the Anglicisation of the Lowlands and provided the Scottish king with an excuse for forays into England, which he could claim were to redress the wrongs against his brother-in-law. The formal link between the royal house of Scotland and Wessex was a threat to William, who marched up to Scotland in 1072 to confront Malcolm. The two kings negotiated the Treaty of Abernethy (1072), through which, according to the Anglo Saxon Chronicle, Malcolm became William's vassal; among the other provisions was the expulsion of Edgar from the Scottish court. Edgar finally submitted to William in 1074. William's hold on the crown was then theoretically uncontested.

In 1080 Walcher, the Bishop of Durham, was murdered by the local Northumbrians. In response, William sent his half-brother Odo, Earl of Kent (Note: Odo, Earl of Kent was also Bishop of Bayeaux. His personal seal depicts him as bishop on one face carrying a crozier. On the other face he is depicted on horseback with a sword and shield. Under church rules he was not supposed to be armed however it seems that he was not adverse to flouting church regulations. He was one of Williams most ruthless commanders who had a reputation for amassing wealth and power. His unfettered ambition brought him into conflict with the Archbishop of Canterbury in 1076 when he faced the Trial of Penenden Heath and finally with William himself in 1082. Odo was tried on a variety of crimes, he was eventually found guilty of treason and imprisoned.) north with an army to harry the Northumbrian countryside. Odo destroyed much land north of the Tees, from York to Durham, and stole valuable items from Durham monastery, including a rare sapphire-encrusted crozier. Many of the Northumbrian nobility were driven into exile.

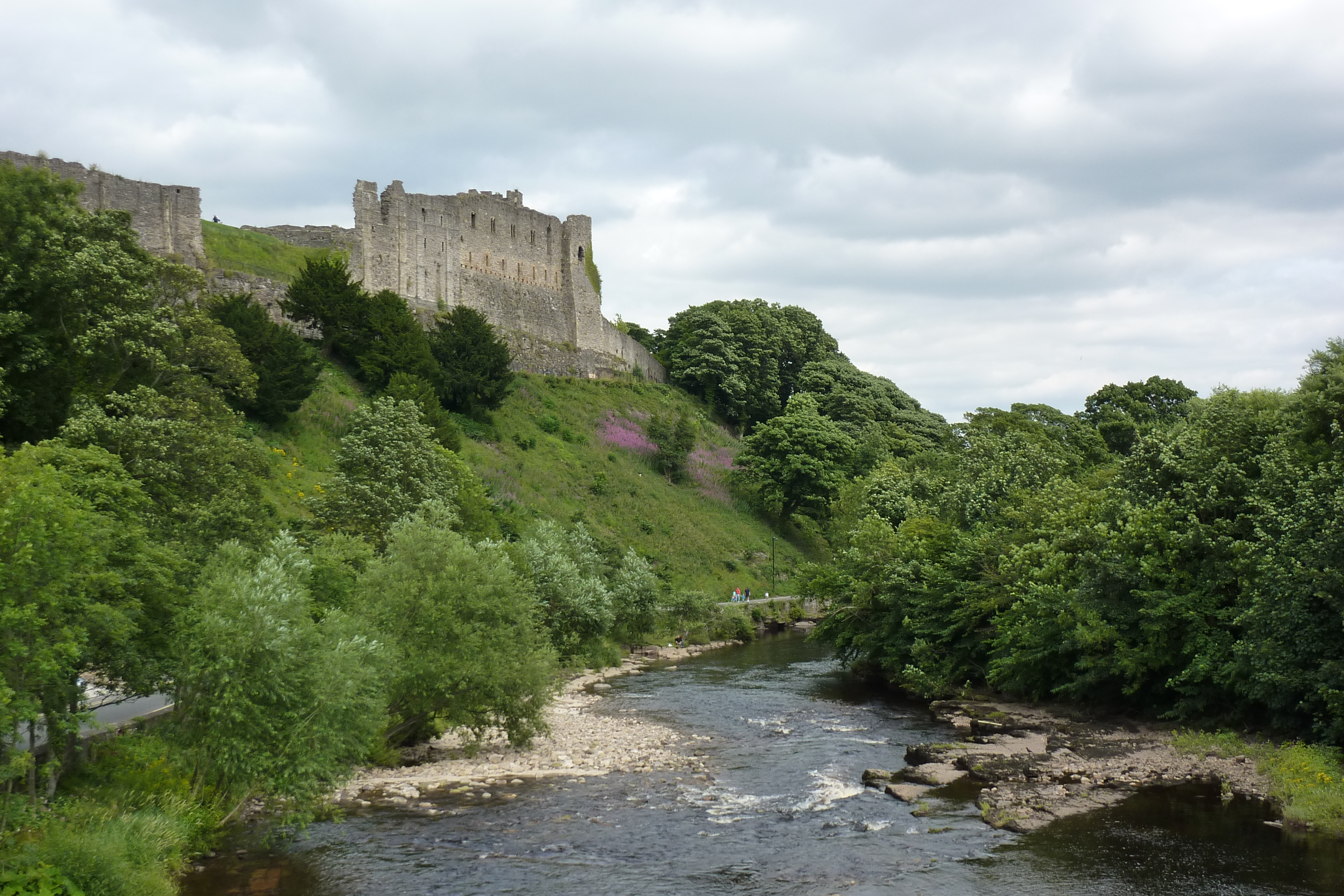
Richmond Castle from across the River Swale

After the conquest of 1066 the Normans used the church as an agent of colonisation with most of the wealthy churches in England passing into the hands of clerics from north west France. There had been no monasteries north of Burton upon Trent in 1066 but post harrying several monasteries were built including Fountains Abbey which became one of the largest and richest. With concern that Yorkshire could be attacked or invaded by the Scots or Vikings coupled with the threat of further revolts, the Normans reorganised the defences in the area and installed men chosen for their abilities to hold on to whatever they got. They increased the number of motte-and-bailey castles they built and in 1071 work commenced above the River Swale, to build a castle at a site now known as 'Richmond'. The name 'Richmond' is derived from the Norman French meaning 'strong hill'. The Honour of Richmond, controlled by Alan Rufus, served to defend the routes out of Scotland into the Vale of York. The central Vale of York was protected by the castles of Pontefract, Wakefield, Conisbrough and Tickhill. While the Lordship of Holderness was reorganised to protect against invaders from the North sea.

As a result of the depopulation, Norman landowners sought settlers to work in the fields. Evidence suggests that such barons were willing to rent lands to any men not obviously disloyal. Unlike the Vikings in the centuries before, Normans did not settle wholesale in the shire but only occupied the upper ranks of society. This allowed an Anglo-Scandinavian culture to survive beneath Norman rule. Evidence for continuity can be seen in the retention of many cultural traits. Many personal names of a pre-conquest character appear in charters that date from the 11th to the 13th century. The vigorous northern literary tradition in the Middle English period and its distinctive dialect also suggest the survival of an Anglo-Scandinavian population. The relative scarcity of Norman place-names implies that the new settlers came in only at the top rank. The Domesday Book shows that at this level, however, Norman takeover in Yorkshire was virtually complete.

From the Norman point of view, the Harrying of the North was a successful strategy, as large areas, including Cheshire, Shropshire, Derbyshire and Staffordshire were devastated, and the Domesday Book confirms this, although in those counties it was not as complete as in Yorkshire. The object of the harrying was to prevent further revolts in Mercia and Northumbria; however, it did not prevent rebellions elsewhere.

== Historiography ==
However, although the Domesday Book records large numbers of manors in the north as waste, some historians have posited it was not possible for William's relatively small army to be responsible for such wide-scale devastation imputed to him, so perhaps raiding Danes (Note: According to Florence of Worcester, "[William] sent messengers to the Danish earl and promised to pay him secretly a large sum of money, and to grant permission for the Danish army to forage freely along the sea coast, on condition that the Danes would depart without fighting when the winter was over.") or Scots (Note: Symeon of Durham said that the Scots under Malcolm III "made sad havoc in the province of Northumbria; and to convey from thence very many men and women captive to Scotland." He also described how the Scots ran through old people with their pikes and hurled babies into the air and caught them on the points of their lances. The Anglo-Saxon Chronicle MS E for 1079 says that Malcolm "ravaged Northumberland as far as the Tyne and killed many hundreds of people and took home much money and people into captivity".) may have contributed to some of the destruction. It has been variously argued that waste signified manorial re-organisation, some form of tax break, or merely a confession of ignorance by the Domesday commissioners when unable to determine details of population and other manorial resources. According to Paul Dalton, it was questionable whether William had the time, manpower or good weather necessary to reduce the north to a desert. It was evident from the chroniclers that William did harry the north, but as the bulk of William's troops, Dalton suggests, were guarding castles in southern England and Wales, and as William was only in the north for a maximum of three months, the amount of damage he could do was limited.

Mark Hagger suggests that in the words of the Anglo-Saxon Chronicle, William's Harrying of the North was "stern beyond measure" but should not be described as genocide as William was acting by the rules of his own time, not the present. Vegetius, the Latin writer, wrote his treatise De Re Militari in the 4th century about Roman warfare, and Hagger posits that this still would have provided the basis for military thinking in the 11th century. Vegetius said, "The main and principal point in war is to secure plenty of provisions and to destroy the enemy by famine", so Hagger's conclusion is that the Harrying of the North was no worse than other similar conflicts of the time.

Other historians have questioned the figures supplied by Orderic Vitalis, who was born in 1075 and would have been writing Ecclesiastical History around 55 years after the event. The figure of 100,000 deaths was perhaps used in a rhetorical sense, as the estimated population for the whole of England, based on the 1086 Domesday returns, was about 2.25 million; thus, a figure of 100,000 represented ca. 4.5% of the entire population of the country at that time. David Horspool concludes that despite the Harrying of the North being regarded with some "shock" in Northern England for some centuries after the event, the destruction may have been exaggerated and the number of dead not as high as previously thought.

== See also ==
- List of incidents of cannibalism
- List of massacres in Great Britain
