= Treaty of Abernethy =

1072 treaty between Scotland and England

The Treaty of Abernethy was signed at the Scottish village of Abernethy in 1072 by King Malcolm III of Scotland and William of Normandy.

William had started his conquest of England when he and his army landed in Sussex, defeating and killing the English King Harold Godwinson at the Battle of Hastings in 1066.

William's army had to suppress many rebellions to secure the kingdom. As a result of the unrest, some English nobles had sought sanctuary in Scotland at the court of Malcolm III. One of them was Edgar Ætheling, a member of the House of Wessex who was the last English claimant to the throne of England.

Faced with a hostile Scotland, allied disaffected English lords, including Edgar and William, rode north and signed the Treaty of Abernethy with Malcolm. Although the specific details of the treaty are lost in history, it is known that in return for swearing allegiance to William, Malcolm was given estates in Cumbria, and Ætheling was banned from the Scottish court.

== Background ==
In 1040, Duncan I had been killed in battle by Macbeth. Duncan's son Malcolm was forced to seek safety in England. Fifteen years later, Malcolm avenged the death of his father at the Battle of Lumphanan, in which Macbeth was killed. Lulach, Macbeth's step-son, briefly succeeded to the throne of Scotland before he died at Malcolm's hands in 1058. With the death of Lulach, Malcolm became King of Scots. During the course of his reign, Malcolm invaded the northern counties of England numerous times. The counties of Northumberland, Cumberland, and Westmorland were historically claimed by Scotland.

In England, after the defeat and death of Harold Godwinson at the Battle of Hastings in 1066, English resistance to their Norman conquerors was centred on Edgar Ætheling, the grandson of Edmund Ironside, half-brother to Edward the Confessor. Copsi, a supporter of Tostig, a previous Anglo-Saxon earl of Northumbria who had been banished by Edward the Confessor, was a native of Northumbria, and his family had a history of being rulers of Bernicia and, at times, Northumbria. Copsi had fought in Harald Hardrada's army with Tostig against Harold Godwinson at the Battle of Stamford Bridge in 1066, but had managed to escape after Harald's defeat. When Copsi offered homage to William at Barking in 1067, William rewarded him by making him earl of Northumbria. After just five weeks as earl, Copsi was murdered by Osulf, son of Earl Eadwulf IV of Bernicia. In turn, the usurping Osulf was also killed, and his cousin, Cospatrick, bought the earldom from William. He was not long in power before he joined Ætheling in rebellion against William in 1068.

With two Earls murdered and one changing sides, William decided to intervene personally in Northumbria. He marched north and arrived in York during the summer of 1068. The opposition melted away, and some of them, including Ætheling, took refuge at the court of Malcolm III.

In the winter of 1069-70, William led his army on a campaign of terror in the English North Country in an action known as the Harrowing of the North.

In 1071, in Scotland, Malcolm married Ætheling's sister, Margaret. The marriage of Malcolm to Edgar's sister profoundly affected the history of England and Scotland. The influence of Margaret and her sons brought about the anglicisation of the Lowlands.

Ætheling sought Malcolm's assistance in his struggle against William. With Edgar as an ally, Malcolm used the opportunity to try to expand his kingdom to include the northern disputed counties of England. In 1071, he invaded Cumberland, possibly to establish the border between Carlisle and Newcastle. He harried the farms and villages and carried off so many people that, according to one chronicler, there was no village or even large house in southern Scotland that did not afterwards have an English servant or two.

== Treaty ==
Malcolm's raiding of northern England and the formal link between the royal house of Scotland and the Anglo-Saxon house of Wessex were obvious threats to William. With his campaign in northern England over, he turned his attention to Scotland. In 1072, he brought an army into southern Scotland. William crossed the Forth and arrived near Abernethy. William and Malcolm signed the Treaty of Abernethy through which, according to the Anglo Saxon Chronicle, Malcolm became William's "liege man". The treaty's full details are unknown, as no documents have survived, but it seems that Malcolm's son Duncan was given as a hostage, and Edgar was expelled from the Scottish court. In return for swearing allegiance to William, Malcolm was given estates in Cumbria.

"This year, King William led an army and a fleet against Scotland, and he stationed the ships along the coast and crossed the Tweed with his army; but he found nothing to reward his pains. And king Malcolm came and treated with king William, delivered hostages, and became his liege-man; and king William returned home with his forces."

— Giles 1914, ASC 1072

== Aftermath and legacy ==
The peace secured by the treaty was an uneasy one. When negotiations over the disputed Cumbrian territories broke down with the new King of England, William Rufus, Malcolm invaded northern England again and besieged Alnwick Castle. Unexpectedly, a relief column arrived, led by the Earl of Northumbria. Malcolm and his son were killed at the ensuing Battle of Alnwick (1093).

In 1173, William the Lion of Scotland supported a rebellion against Henry II of England. In 1174, William was captured at the Battle of Alnwick (1174) and transferred to Falaise, in Normandy. There, he signed the Treaty of Falaise, which effectively surrendered Scotland to Henry. Henry then handed Scotland back to William as a fief in return for William's homage to Henry.

However, after Henry II's death, William petitioned Richard I to be released from the terms imposed on Scotland by the treaty. Richard, needing to raise finances for the Third Crusade, accepted William's offer of 10,000 marks. At Canterbury on 5 December 1189, Richard released him from all allegiance and subjection for the Kingdom of Scotland, which remained an independent realm until Edward I successfully revived English claims of overlordship in 1291-2.
