= Richard Muir =

Richard Muir may refer to:

- Sir Richard Muir (barrister) (1857–1924), British barrister
- Richard Muir (archaeologist) (born 1943), British landscape archaeologist

== See also ==
- Dick Muir (born 1965), South African rugby union player
- Ricky Muir (born 1980), Australian politician
