= Ernest Muir =

Ernest Muir may refer to:

- Ernest Muir (doctor) (1880–1974), Scottish physician who studied leprosy
- E. Roger Muir (1918–2008), Canadian-American television producer
- Richard Ernest Muir (born 1943), British landscape historian and author
