= Osulf of Northumbria =

Osulf of Northumbria can refer to:

- Oswulf of Northumbria (d. 759), king of Northumbria
- Osulf I of Bamburgh (fl. 946–54)
- Osulf II of Bamburgh (d. 1067), earl of Bamburgh
