= Northumbrian Revolt of 1065 =

Rebellion in Anglo-Saxon England

Date	October 1065
Location	York
Result	Tostig exiled

Belligerents
Rebels	Kingdom of England

Commanders and leaders
Morcar	King Edward the Confessor; Tostig Godwinson

The Northumbrian Revolt of 1065 was a rebellion in the last months of the reign of Edward the Confessor against the earl of Northumbria, Tostig Godwinson, brother of Harold Godwinson, Earl of Wessex. Tostig, who had been earl since 1055, is said to have provoked his nobles to rise against him by his harsh administration of justice, raising of tax levels, frequent absences from his earldom, and murder of several political opponents. In October 1065, the rebels entered Northumbria's capital, York, killed Tostig's men, looted his treasury, renounced their allegiance to Tostig and proclaimed Morcar, brother of Edwin, Earl of Mercia, as their new earl. They then marched south to Northampton, causing much devastation in Yorkshire and the North Midlands as they went, and joining forces with the army of Mercia. The king sent his chief earl, Harold Godwinson, to negotiate with them, and when they refused to compromise on the deposition of Tostig he tried and failed to raise his own army against them. On Harold's advice, he finally gave in to their demands and recognised Morcar. Tostig was sent into exile in Flanders, from where, disgusted at what he saw as his brother's betrayal, he shortly afterward raided the English coast, finally dying in arms against him at the Battle of Stamford Bridge.

The Northumbrian Revolt was seen at the time, and is still often seen, as the first stage in the destabilising of the English kingdom that led up to the Norman Conquest.

== Background ==
During the first part of the reign of Edward the Confessor, from 1042 to 1055, much of his power was shared with his nobles, of whom the most important were the earls of Wessex, Mercia and Northumbria. By the end of this period there was a balance of power between the three main noble families, Harold Godwinson controlling the south of England, Siward the north, and Leofric and his son Ælfgar the centre.

This state of affairs came to an end when Siward, Earl of Northumbria died in 1055, presenting Edward with a difficult choice of successor. Siward's elder son had already died in battle, and the younger one was still a child, so the successful candidate would have to come from a different family. He would need to be able to win the support of the Northumbrian nobles, but also work closely with Edward himself and help to integrate this distant earldom into the larger English political structure. Leofric's son Ælfgar, Earl of East Anglia, seems to have been hopeful that he would win the prize, and possibly some unknown member of the ancient ruling house of Bernicia had the same ambition, while Harold, Earl of Wessex, was lobbying for his younger brother, Tostig. When the king's council, the Witan, was convened on 19 March, Ælfgar was taken out of the running by being accused of treason and sentenced to outlawry, and Northumbria was assigned to Tostig. Ælfgar was soon reinstated in East Anglia, and when his father died in 1057 he was allowed to succeed him in Mercia, though Gyrth, another of the Godwinsons, became Earl of East Anglia in his stead. This move, together with the creation of new minor earldoms and substantial redrawing of borders at Ælfgar's expense, left him possessed of a smaller Mercia than his father had ruled, while all the rest of England was held, under the king, by the Godwinsons, and principally by the brothers Harold and Tostig.

== Tostig's rule in Northumbria ==
The Vita Ædwardi Regis, an anonymous Latin life of Edward the Confessor written at about the time of the Norman Conquest, includes a description of Tostig's appearance and character. It calls him strong, brave, handsome and graceful, open-handed, especially with gifts to the Church, trustworthy, faithful to his wife, secretive, shrewd, not rash, capable of restraint, but generally vigorous and unwearying in pursuing his purposes, sometimes to the point of overzealousness in confronting evil. He was a particular favourite with the king. When he took up his new position he was probably still in his mid-twenties, and the task that faced him was formidable. Northumbria was a turbulent, feud-ridden, and lawless province far distant from his own native Wessex, and its nobles may have resented having a southerner placed over them, though it is also possible that having no connection with any of the three main Northumbrian factions (based around the house of Bamburgh, the see of Durham, and the Yorkshire nobility) he benefited from being seen as neutral. Perhaps also the fact that Tostig had a Danish mother would have helped him to understand the mixed Anglo-Saxon and Danish culture of Northumbria.

One of the major problems facing Tostig was the defence of his province against aggression from the king of Scots, Malcolm Canmore. Malcolm initially launched a series of cross-border raids into Northumbria, but Tostig countered them peacefully, helping to negotiate a treaty between England and Scotland which was sealed by an oath of blood brotherhood between himself and Malcolm. This peace did not entirely hold. There was a major Scottish raid into Northumbria in 1061, and Malcolm may have invaded and annexed Cumbria some time in the period 1058 to 1061, though it is also possible that this happened after Tostig's death. Tostig nevertheless felt able to frequently absent himself from his earldom, sometimes attending the king's court, sometimes his personal estates in Wiltshire, on one occasion collaborating with his brother Harold in an invasion of Wales, and on another making a pilgrimage to Rome. During these absences Northumbria was capably governed by Tostig's deputy, Copsi, but it nevertheless started to become restive while its earl was elsewhere.

One major source of tension between Tostig and the Northumbrian thanes was his imposition of a tribute seen by them as being unjust and excessive. This may have been an attempt to bring the local tax-levels, historically very low, more into line with those in the rest of England; or, since one third of such tributes were retained by the earl rather than the king, it may have been intended to defray Tostig's own expenses, such as those incurred by his campaigning in Wales. He is also reported by the Anglo-Saxon Chronicle to have become unpopular because he "robbed God", a mysterious phrase whose precise meaning can only be guessed at since he was a conspicuously pious and generous son of the Church. Another sore point was his administration of justice in this lawless province, which was seen as harsh. Robbers could be killed or mutilated and their property confiscated; indeed, some alleged that his profits from this last measure were his main motive for pursuing wrongdoers. There is some indication that he introduced laws from Wessex in an attempt to stamp out the Northumbrian tradition of blood feuds, though he ended up embroiled in such feuds himself. Tostig's relations with discontented thegns reached a new low point when, in 1063 or 1064, he had two of them, Gamal son of Orm and Ulf son of Dolfin, murdered while they were visiting him under safe-conduct. A third noble, Gospatric son of Uhtred, was likewise murdered at Christmas 1064, either at Tostig's instigation or at that of his sister Edith. The dissident faction in Northumbria now knew that their grievances could not be ended by compromise, but only by more extreme measures.

== Outbreak of the revolt ==
On 3 October 1065, while Tostig was away hunting with the king, Edward the Confessor, in Wiltshire, a force of 200 warriors led by three thegns named Gamelbearn, presumably a relative of the murdered Gamal, Dunstan son of Æthelnoth and Glonieorn son of Heardwulf, entered York with the support of its citizens, stormed Tostig's house and there killed two of his housecarls (household troops). The following day they massacred some 200 of his supporters and seized his treasury, still full as it was of the gold and silver collected by his reeves in the latest round of tax-gathering. The whole thegnage of Yorkshire, according to the Anglo-Saxon Chronicle, now rose in revolt. The rebels declared Tostig an outlaw and named Morcar, brother of the Edwin, Earl of Mercia, as their new earl. Native Northumbrian candidates for the post had been available to them, notably Waltheof, son of the old earl Siward, but the choice of Morcar ensured the support of Mercia. Morcar and Edwin were both young men, sons of the recently deceased Ælfgar, earl of Mercia; they are known to have been considered rivals to Tostig, perhaps ever since he took up the earldom. The Northumbrian rebels moved south, gathering along the way reinforcements from Nottinghamshire, Derbyshire and Lincolnshire. Men identified, rightly or wrongly, as belonging to Tostig's party were slaughtered wherever they were found, whether in the streets of York and Lincoln or in the villages, fields and waterways. Upon reaching Northampton they were joined by Edwin with a large Mercian army which included also some Welsh troops.

== Its settlement ==
The king responded by calling his counsellors to join him at Britford in Wiltshire, from where they moved in October to Oxford. The advice they gave him was conflicting and intemperate. Some thought Tostig had brought this crisis on himself by his harsh government. Tostig blamed his brother Harold, accusing him of having plotted the rebellion himself, but this Harold denied on oath. It is impossible now to be sure whether Harold actually had any involvement or not, but Tostig never forgave his brother. Harold was sent to negotiate with the rebels, and the rebels asked him to intercede for them with the king and induce him to accept their choice of Morcar as earl. When Harold returned south on this mission they proceeded to harry the region around Northampton, killing many, taking others prisoner, and burning barns and houses. The king sent messengers telling them that he would redress all valid grievances so long as they halted their devastation and relied instead on legal process. The rebels responded with a pre-condition that the king must first depose and exile Tostig. The king summoned his army to assemble, hoping to crush the rebellion, but no army responded to his call. The difficulty of mobilising in unseasonably wintry weather was used as an excuse for this, but the underlying problem was that no-one relished the prospect of a civil war. When the king's chief men simply refused to obey him, and when Harold, his greatest earl, advised him to abandon Tostig's cause, he realized that he had no further options. On 27 October he acceded to the Northumbrians' demands, promised that their old laws would be restored, loaded Tostig with precious gifts, and sent him into exile. It was to be his last public act.

== Its consequences ==
A contemporary source, the Vita Ædwardi Regis, tells us that the king "protested to God with deep sorrow that he was deprived of the due obedience of his men in repressing the presumption of the unrighteous; and he called down God's vengeance upon them". Such was his grief, continues the Vita, that he fell sick and grew progressively worse. This sickness, which can probably be identified as a series of strokes, ended with his death in January 1066 and the accession to the English throne of his nominated successor, Harold.

Tostig, together with his family and household, accepted the hospitality of his brother-in-law, Baldwin V, Count of Flanders, who made him his deputy in Saint-Omer and gave him the use of that port's revenues and knights. Mercenaries in large numbers joined forces with him there, possibly including Hereward the Wake. His movements in the next few months are uncertain, but there are reports of his having visited William II, Duke of Normandy, Swein Estrithson, King of Denmark, and Harald Hardrada, King of Norway, in search of allies who might help him regain his position in England by force. Certainly, in the spring of 1066 he raided various parts of the English coast from the Isle of Wight up to the Humber, before linking up with Harald Hardrada's invasion force in September 1066. Thereafter he shared the Norwegian king's fortunes, dying with him at Stamford Bridge on 25 September, in a battle which did much to deplete the forces of its victor, Tostig's brother Harold, and to divert his attention from the defence of the south coast against the threat from Normandy.

For contemporary observers, in particular the Vita Ædwardi Regis and the C recension of the Anglo-Saxon Chronicle, the Northumbrian Revolt and the rift between Tostig and Harold set in motion the events which culminated in the Norman Conquest. In modern times, Michael John Key has called Tostig's anger at his brother "the fuse that would blow the Anglo-Saxon kingdom apart", and some historians, such as Frank Stenton and Kelly DeVries have believed that the removal of Northumbria from the holdings of the Godwin family seriously weakened the ability of the English kingdom under Harold to resist attack. Others, however, such as N. J. Higham and Tom Licence hold the contrary opinion that it was in Harold's interests to further the ambitions of the brothers Edwin and Morcar, whose sister Ealdgyth he at some unknown date married and whose alliance he thereby gained.
