= Morcar =

11th-century English earl

Morcar (or Morcere) (Old English: Mōrcǣr, Old Norse: Mǫrukári) (died after 1087) was the son of Ælfgār (earl of Mercia) and brother of Ēadwine. He was the earl of Northumbria from 1065 to 1066, when William the Conqueror replaced him with Copsi.

== Dispute with the Godwins ==
Morcar and his brother Ēadwine, now Earl of Mercia, assisted the Northumbrian rebels to expel Tostig Godwinson. In October 1065 the Northumbrians chose Morcar as earl at York. He at once satisfied the people of the Bernicia by making over the government of the country beyond the River Tyne to Osulf of Bamburgh, the eldest son of Eadwulf IV of Bamburgh, the Bernician earl whom Siward had slain in 1041. Marching southwards with the rebels, Morcar gathered into his forces the men of Nottingham, Derby, and Lincoln, members of the old Danish confederacy of towns, and met Ēadwine, who was at the head of a considerable force at Northampton. There the brothers and their rebel army considered proposals for peace offered to them by Earl Harold Godwinson. Negotiations continued at Oxford, where, the Northumbrians insisting on the recognition of Morcar, Harold yielded on the 28th, and Morcar's election was legalised.

== Events of 1066 ==
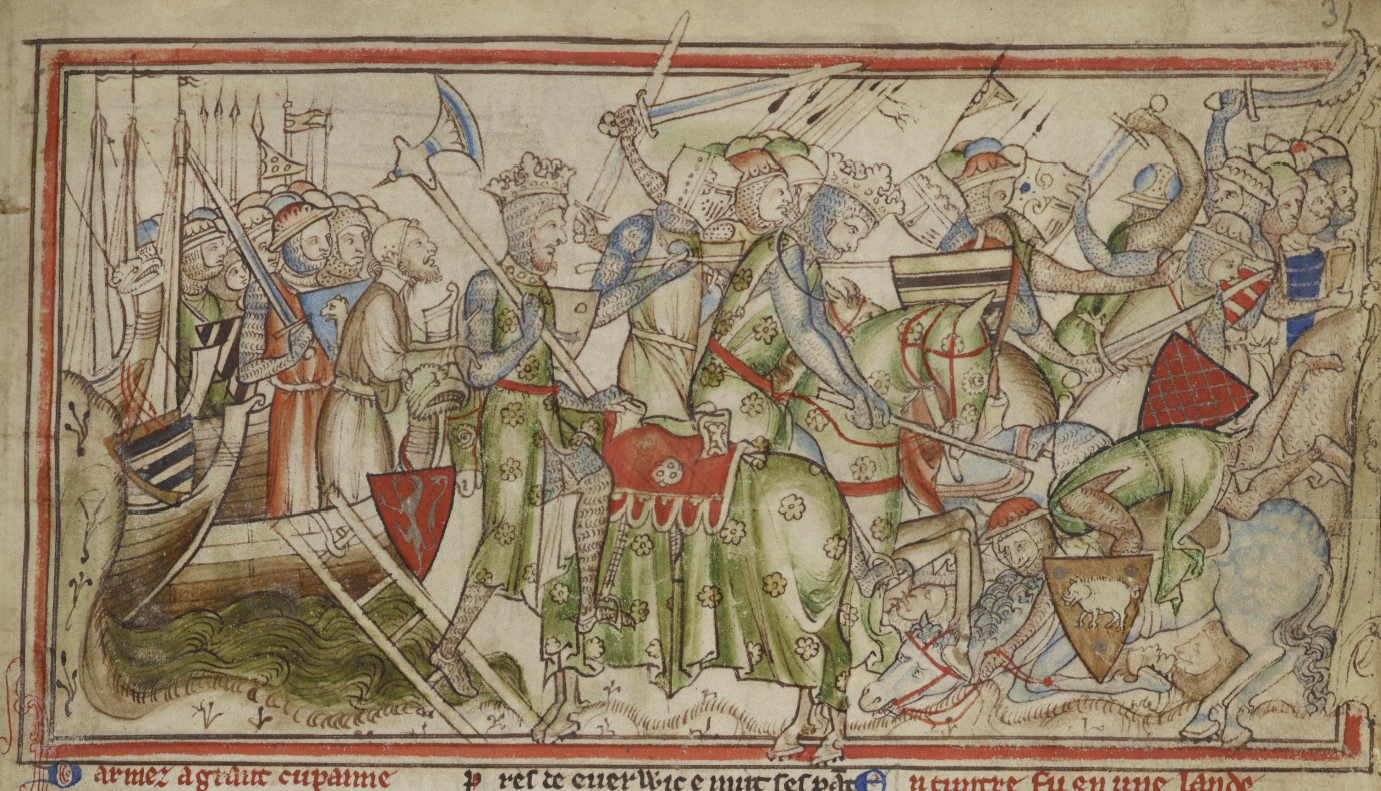
The Battle of Fulford, in which Morcar was a commander, from The Life of King Edward the Confessor by Matthew Paris.

On the death of Edward the Confessor, Morcar professedly supported Harold, but the people of his earldom were dissatisfied. Harold visited York, the seat of Morcar's government, in the spring of 1066, and overcame their disaffection by peaceful means. In the summer, Morcar joined his brother Edwin in repulsing Tostig, who was ravaging the Mercian coast. When, however, Tostig and his ally Harald Hardrada invaded Northumbria in September, Morcar evidently was not ready to meet them; it was not until York was threatened that, having then been joined by Edwin, he went out against them with a large army. The two earls were defeated at Fulford Gate near York in a fierce battle in which, according to a Norse authority, Morcar seems to have been prominent.

York was surrendered, and Harold Godwinson had to march in haste to save the north by the Battle of Stamford Bridge. Ungrateful for this deliverance, Morcar and his brother held back the forces of the north from joining Harold in the defense of the kingdom against the Normans. After the Battle of Hastings, Morcar and his brother arrived at London, sent their sister Ealdgyth, Harold's widow, to Chester, and urged the citizens to raise one or the other of them to the throne.

They concurred in the election of Edgar the Ætheling but, disappointed of their hope, left the city with their forces and returned to the north, believing that the Conqueror would not advance so far. Before long, however, they met William of Normandy either at Berkhamsted, or more probably at Barking, after his coronation. William accepted their submission, received from them gifts and hostages, and they were reinstated. The Conqueror carried Morcar and his brother with him into Normandy in 1067, and after his return kept them at his court.

== Death ==
In 1068, they withdrew from the court, reached their earldoms, and rebelled against William. They were supported by a large number both of English and Welsh; the clergy, the monks, and the poor were strongly on their side, and messages were sent to every part of the kingdom to stir up resistance. Morcar's activity may perhaps be inferred from the prominent part taken in the movement by York. It seems probable, however, that Edgar was nominally the head of the rebellion, and that he was specially upheld by the Bernician district under Gospatric. Morcar and his brother were not inclined to risk too much; they advanced with their men to Warwick, and there made submission to the Conqueror, were pardoned, and again kept at court, the king treating them with an appearance of favour. On their defection, the rebellion came to nothing. In 1071, some mischief was made between them and the king, and William, it is said, was about to send them to prison, but they escaped secretly from the court.

After wandering about for a while, keeping to wild country, they separated, and Morcar joined the insurgents in the Isle of Ely, and remained with them until the surrender of the island. Morcar, it is said, surrendered himself on the assurance that the king would pardon him and receive him as a loyal friend. William, however, committed him to the custody of Roger de Beaumont, who kept him closely imprisoned in Normandy.

When the king was on his deathbed in 1087, he ordered that Morcar should be released, in common with others whom he had kept in prison in England and Normandy, on condition that they took an oath not to disturb the peace in either land. He was not long out of prison, for William Rufus took him to England, and on arriving at Winchester put him in prison there. Nothing further is known about him, and it is therefore probable that he died in prison.

== See also ==
- Drogo de la Beuvrière, who acquired many of Morcar's land holdings after the conquest

== Sources ==
- Freeman, E. A. Norman Conquest and William Rufus vol. i.
- FNQ Gesta Herwardi from the Book of Robert of Swaffham, published as a supplement to Fenland Notes and Queries ed. W.D. Sweeting (1895–97)

Peerage of England
Preceded by Tostig	Earl of Northumbria; 1065–1066	Succeeded by Copsi
