= Edwin, Earl of Mercia =

11th-century English earl

Edwin (Old English: eadwine) (died 1071) was the elder brother of Morcar, Earl of Northumbria, son of Ælfgār, Earl of Mercia and grandson of Leofric, Earl of Mercia. He succeeded to his father's title and responsibilities on Ælfgār's death in 1062. He appears as Earl Edwin (Eduin comes) in the Domesday Book.

== Family ==
His younger brother, Morcar was elected Earl of Northumbria when Tostig Godwinson was ejected by the Northumbrians (3 October 1065). Tostig had been accused of robbing churches, depriving men of their lands and lives, and acting against the law.

Edwin's sister, Ealdgyth, had been married to Harold Godwinson until the latter's death at Hastings on 14 October 1066.

== Career ==
In 1066, Tostig raided in Mercia but was repulsed by Edwin and Morcar and fled to Scotland. Later in the year he returned, accompanied by King Harald Hardrada of Norway at the head of a huge Norwegian army, which defeated Edwin and Morcar at the Battle of Fulford near York (20 September). Harald and Tostig were in turn defeated and slain by Harold Godwinson's army, five days later at the Battle of Stamford Bridge (25 September). After Harold's death at the Battle of Hastings, where Edwin and Morcar were absent, they were the principal supporters of a new regime under Edgar the Ætheling, though they had wished the public to elect one of them king, but failed to take effective steps against the invading Normans and soon submitted to Duke William.

In 1068, Edwin and Morcar attempted to raise a rebellion in Mercia but swiftly submitted when William moved against them. Edwin died in 1071; while making his way to Scotland he was betrayed by his own retinue to the Normans and killed.

== Lands ==
Edwin's lands centred at Gilling West in his brother's Northumbrian earldom, were given to Alain Le Roux (also known as Alan Rufus) in 1071 or perhaps earlier, and the district was renamed Richmondshire, or the Honour of Richmond.

== Depictions in fiction ==
Edwin was portrayed by Adam Bareham in the TV drama Blood Royal: William the Conqueror (1990). He is mentioned in Alice's Adventures in Wonderland (1865) by Lewis Carroll, when the mouse attempts to dry itself and other characters by reciting a dry example of English history. This inclusion in Carroll's book is made interesting as he is distantly related to both Edwin and Morcar. (Martin Gardner, The Annotated Alice, Clarkson Potter, New York (1960), pp 46–7.)

Peerage of England
Preceded by Ælfgār	Earl of Mercia; 1062–1071	Vacant
