= Baile Hill =

Earthwork in York, England

Coordinates: 53.95394°N 1.08291°W

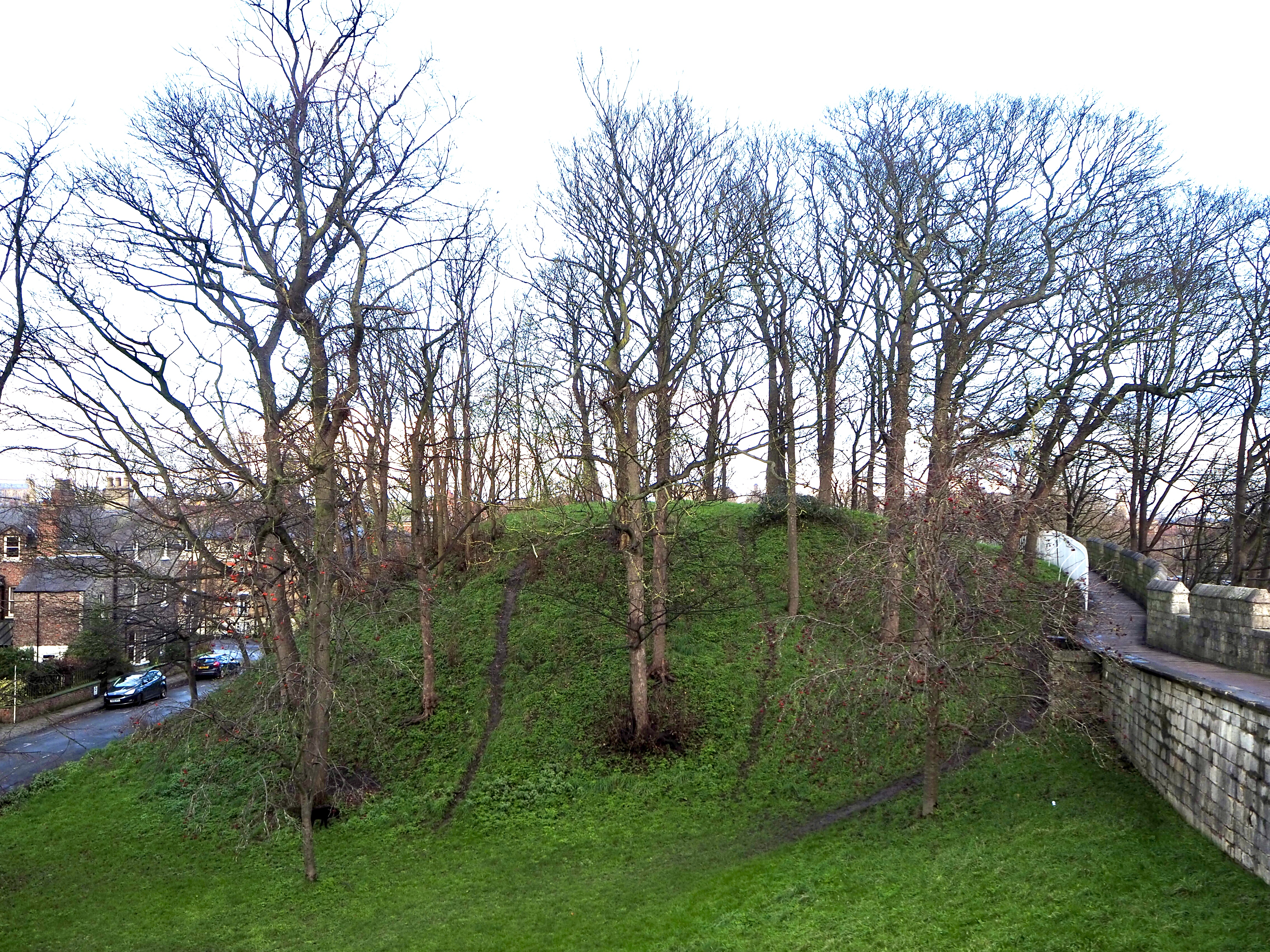
Baile Hill, a surviving Norman motte

Baile Hill is a man-made earth mound in the Bishophill area of York, England. It is the only remaining feature of the fortification known as the Old Baile.

The origins of Baile Hill date back to 1068. Having seized York in that year, William the Conqueror built a castle on the south side of the city close to the River Ouse. Then, as a response to a rebellion the following year, a second castle was built on the opposite side of the river. There is no clear evidence which of these castles was built first, but it is generally thought to be the one which stood on the site of the later York Castle on the east side of the river, followed by the Old Baile on the west side.

Like its opposite counterpart, the Old Baile was a motte-and-bailey castle. The motte was approximately 40 feet (12 m) high and 180 feet (66 m) in diameter, and was surrounded by a large ditch. A flight of steps led to a wooden structure at the top which was surrounded by a fence, also made of wood. The bailey lay to the north-west of the motte and was rectangular. Around its perimeter was an earth rampart and an outer ditch.

The castle, it is believed, was not in regular use for long. By the 13th century it was in the hands of the Archbishop of York and in 1322 Archbishop Melton agreed to defend it in times of war. By c. 1340 part of the city wall had been built along the south-east and south-west sides of the Old Baile, incorporating the existing ramparts and ditch, however, these defences were rarely called into use. The only notable occasion was the siege of York in 1644 during the Civil War, when Baile Hill was used as a royalist gun emplacement. Apart from that, however, the Old Baile was used mainly for grazing and recreation activities, particularly archery during the medieval period.

Today, Baile Hill stands at the junction of Baile Hill Terrace and Cromwell Road. The only other visible evidence of the former castle are two slight dips in the city wall rampart, one next to Baile Hill and the other close to Victoria Bar, which indicate the location of the former ditch. Houses built during the 1880s cover the rest of the Old Baile.
