= Copsi =

Magnate in Anglo-Saxon England (died 1067)

Copsi (or Copsig; Old English: Cōpsige; died 1067) was a Northumbrian magnate in late Anglo-Saxon England. He was a supporter of Tostig, and was exiled along with him in 1065. Copsi soon fled to Orkney (then a part of Norway). The next year (1066), he joined Tostig at Sandwich, in Kent, with 17 ships. Copsi survived Tostig's defeat at Stamford Bridge, and when William the Conqueror prevailed at Hastings he travelled, in March 1067, to pay William homage at Barking (where William was staying while his tower was being constructed in London). In return, William made Copsi Earl of Northumbria and sent him back to York. Copsi's rule lasted a mere five weeks, at which time he was murdered by Osulf, son of Eadulf IV of the ancient Bernician family which had historically governed the area from Bamburgh, at Newburn-upon-Tyne. Osulf led a small force which surprised Copsi during a banquet and forced him to flee to a nearby church, which was then set on fire. He was then captured and beheaded by Osulf. Osulf, however, only ruled as earl until that autumn, when he was killed by an outlaw he was tracking.

== Sources ==
- Stenton, Sir Frank M. Anglo-Saxon England Third Edition. Oxford University Press, 1971.

Peerage of England
Preceded by Morcar	Earl of Northumbria; 1067	Succeeded by Osulf
