= Oswulf II of Bamburgh =

Osulf or Oswulf (died 1067) was the son of Eadwulf IV, Earl of Bamburgh (killed 1041), and grandson of Uhtred the Bold, ruler of Bamburgh and ealdorman of Northumbria (killed 1016). Oswulf's family ruled Bamburgh from 954 until 1041, though their independence may have been compromised after 1041 when Siward the Stout killed Eadwulf and gained hegemony over the north.

In 1065, Morcar succeeded Tostig as ealdorman of Northumbria and nominal overlord of Oswulf, ruling the portion north of the River Tyne. However, because of Morcar's resistance to the Norman invasion of England by William the Conqueror in 1066, he was deposed and imprisoned. William then appointed Copsi (sometimes Copsig), Tostig's former deputy, as Morcar's replacement.

In February 1067, Copsi came north and forced Oswulf to seek shelter in the hills. Oswulf began to gather an army. Because Copsi was seen as an invader and a tax-gatherer for William, he was deeply unpopular among the Northumbrians north and south of the Tyne, and Oswulf had no trouble in gathering recruits. On 12 March, he surprised Copsi and his men at a banquet at Newburn-upon-Tyne. Copsi fled to a nearby church but this was set on fire, forcing Copsi out. Oswulf then had Copsi's head cut off.

Oswulf appears to have seized control of the earldom of Bamburgh, and was not threatened by any expeditions to remove him. However, in the autumn of 1067, Oswulf, who appears to have been carrying out his duties as earl, intercepted an outlaw and was run through by the man's spear.

He was succeeded as earl by his cousin, Gospatric, who allegedly paid King William for the latter's recognition of his earldom.

== Sources ==
- Aird, William M., "Osulf, earl of Bamburgh (d. 1067)", Oxford Dictionary of National Biography, Oxford University Press, 2004, accessed 30 Dec 2008
- Kapelle, William E., The Norman Conquest of the North, University of North Carolina Press, 1979.
- Stenton, Sir Frank M. Anglo-Saxon England Third Edition. Oxford University Press, 1971.

Peerage of England
Vacant Merged into the Earldom of Northumbria from 1041 to 1065; Bamburgh ruled by Morcar to 1065 Title last held by Eadwulf IV	Earl of Bamburgh; Opposed by: Copsi; 1065–1067	Permanently merged into the Earldom of Northumbria; Bamburgh ruled by Cospatric from 1067
