= Richard Muir (archaeologist) =

British landscape archaeologist

Richard Ernest Muir (born 18 June 1943) is a British landscape archaeologist and author living outside Harrogate, Yorkshire.

== Education ==
Muir was awarded his first degree and his doctorate by the University of Aberdeen where he is now an Honorary Research Fellow. He has been a lecturer in geography at several British and Irish universities.

== Publications ==
He has been widely published for over 30 years on landscape history. He founded and initially edited the journal Landscapes. His works include:

- Modern Political Geography (1975)
- The English Village (1980)
- The Lost Villages of Britain (1982)
- History From The Air (1983)
- The National Trust Guide to Prehistoric and Roman Britain (with H Welfare, 1983)
- The Yorkshire Countryside: A Landscape History (1997)
- Landscape Encyclopaedia (2004)
