= Eadwulf IV of Bamburgh =

Earl of Bamburg

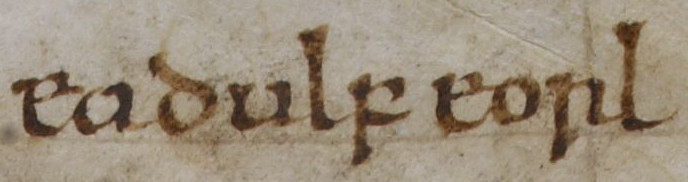
The name of Eadwulf given as "Eadulf eorl" in the Anglo-Saxon Chronicle.

Eadulf IV or Eadwulf IV (died 1041) was the ruler of Bamburgh from 1038 until his death. He was a son of Uhtred the Bold and his second wife Sige, daughter of Styr Ulfsson. Eadwulf had one full sibling, a younger brother Gospatric. He succeeded his older half-brother Ealdred, who was murdered by the son of Thurbrand the Hold in a bloodfeud started when Thurbrand murdered Uhtred. The Anglo-Saxon Chronicle asserts that in 1041 Eadwulf was "betrayed" by King Harthacnut. The "betrayal" seems to have been carried out by Siward, Earl of Northumbria; when the Libellus de exordio and other sources write about the same event, they say that Siward attacked and killed Eadulf. Siward then became earl of all Northumbria, perhaps the first person to do so since Uhtred the Bold. Eadulf was the last of the ancient Bernician line of earls to rule until his son Osulf usurped the Northumbrian earldom in 1067.

== Family ==
Eadwulf is known to have married Sigrid, daughter of Kilvert of Lumley and his wife Ecgfrida of Durham. The same Ecgfrida that was the first wife of his father Uhtred, and mother of Eadwulf's older half-brother Ealdred. Sigrid was born of Ecgfrida's second marriage to Kilvert, therefore Eadwulf and his wife were not blood-related. Eadwulf is only identified to have had one son, Osulf II of Bamburgh. Osulf's mother has not been confirmed but was presumably Sigrid, as she was Eadwulf's only known wife. After Eadwulf's death, Sigrid married several more times.

In the Historia Regum Anglorum, Eadwulf is recorded as having led a military campaign against the Britons of Cumbria in 1038. The Cumbrians may have lost the lands which they had held south of the Solway at this time.

== Sources ==
- Clarkson, Tim, Strathclyde and the Anglo-Saxons in the Viking Age, Birlinn, Edinburgh, 2014.
- Stenton, Sir Frank M. Anglo-Saxon England Third Edition. Oxford University Press, 1971.
- Fletcher, Richard. Bloodfeud: Murder and Revenge in Anglo-Saxon England. Allen Lane, 2002.

Preceded by Ealdred II	Earl of Bernicia; 1038–1041	Vacant Merged into the Earldom of Northumbria Title next held by Oswulf II in 1065
