= Gospatric, Earl of Northumbria =

Earl of Northumbria (died after 1073)

Gospatric

Earl of Northumbria
- Successor: Robert Comine
- Died: after 1073
- Issue: Dolfin of Carlisle; Gospatric II, Earl of Lothian; Waltheof of Allerdale; Ethelreda
- Father: Maldred
- Mother: Ealdgyth

Gospatric or Cospatric (from the Cumbric form of the Brittonic name element Gwas-Patric, 'devotee or servant of Patrick'), (d. after 1073), was Earl of Northumbria and later lord of extensive estates centred on Dunbar. His male-line descendants held the Earldom of Dunbar, later known as the Earldom of March, in southeastern Scotland until 1435, and the Lordship and Earldom of Home from 1473 to the present.

== Background ==
Symeon of Durham describes Gospatric, Earl of Northumbria, as maternal grandson, through his mother Ealdgyth, of Northumbrian ealdorman Uhtred the Bold and his third wife, Ælfgifu, daughter of King Æthelred II. This follows the ancestry given in the earlier De obsessione Dunelmi, in which Gospatric's father is named as Maldred, son of Crinan, tein (thegn Crínán), perhaps the Crínán of Dunkeld who was father of Scottish king Duncan I. Even were thegn Crínán the same as Crínán of Dunkeld, it is not certain Maldred was born to Duncan's mother, Bethóc, daughter of the Scots king Malcolm II.

The Life of Edward the Confessor, commissioned by Queen Edith, contains an account of the pilgrimage to Rome of Tostig Godwinson, Earl of Northumbria. It tells how a band of robbers attacked Tostig's party in Italy, seeking to kidnap the Earl. A certain Gospatric "was believed because of the luxury of his clothes and his physical appearance, which was indeed distinguished" to be Earl Tostig, and succeeded in deceiving the would-be kidnappers as to his identity until the real Earl was safely away from the scene. Whether this was the same Gospatric, or a kinsman of the same name, is unclear, but it is suggested that his presence in Tostig's party was as a hostage as much as a guest.

== Harrying of the North ==
After his victory over Harold Godwinson at Hastings, William of Normandy appointed a certain Copsi or Copsig, a supporter of the late Earl Tostig, who had been exiled with his master in 1065, as Earl of Bernicia in the spring of 1067. Copsi was dead within five weeks, killed by Oswulf, grandson of Uchtred, who installed himself as Earl. Oswulf was killed in the autumn by bandits after less than six months as Earl. At this point, Gospatric, who had a plausible claim to the Earldom given the likelihood that he was related to Oswulf and Uchtred, offered King William a large amount of money to be given the Earldom of Bernicia. The King, who was in the process of raising heavy taxes, accepted.

In early 1068, a series of uprisings in England, along with foreign invasion, faced King William with a dire threat. Gospatric is found among the leaders of the uprising, along with Edgar Ætheling and Edwin, Earl of Mercia and his brother Morcar. This uprising soon collapsed, and William proceeded to dispossess many of the northern landowners and grant the lands to Norman incomers. For Gospatric, this meant the loss of his earldom to Robert Comine and exile in Scotland. King William's authority, apart from minor local troubles such as Hereward the Wake and Eadric the Wild, appeared to extend securely across England.

Gospatric joined the invading army of Danes, Scots, and Englishmen under Edgar the Aetheling in the next year. Though the army was defeated, he afterwards was able, from his possession of Bamburgh castle, to make terms with the Conqueror, who left him undisturbed until 1072. The widespread destruction in Northumbria known as the Harrying of the North relates to this period.

== Exile ==
According to Anglo-Norman chroniclers, in 1072 William the Conqueror stripped Gospatric of his Earldom of Northumbria, and replaced him with Siward's son Waltheof, 1st Earl of Northampton.

Gospatric fled into exile in Scotland and not long afterwards went to Flanders. When he returned to Scotland he was granted the castle at "Dunbar and lands adjacent to it" and in the Merse by King Malcolm III, his cousin. This earldom without a name in the Scots-controlled northern part of Bernicia would later become the Earldom of Dunbar.

Gospatric did not long survive in exile according to Roger of Hoveden's chronicle:

[N]ot long after this, being reduced to extreme infirmity, he sent for Aldwin and Turgot, the monks, who at this time were living at Meilros, in poverty and contrite in spirit for the sake of Christ, and ended his life with a full confession of his sins, and great lamentations and penitence, at Ubbanford, which is also called Northam, and was buried in the porch of the church there.

Neil McGuigan has argued that Waltheof's Norman earldom did not extend beyond the River Tyne, and that Gospatric may have continued to rule the territory to the north from Bamburgh until the late 1070s.

== Issue ==
Gospatric was the father of three sons, and several daughters. The sons Dolfin, Waltheof and Gospatric are named in De obsessione Dunelmi and by Symeon of Durham, while a document from about 1275 apparently prepared to instruct advocates in a land dispute reports that of these three sons, only Waltheof was born to a legitimate marriage and that he was full sibling of Gospatric's daughter Ethelreda. A second document with some "nearly identical" content prepared about the same time names three sisters of Waltheof of Allerdale, Gunnilda, Matilla and Ethreda, their husbands, as well as Ethreda's son William Fitz Duncan. Gospatric's children were:

- Dolfin, oldest son, received from Malcolm the government of Carlisle.
- Gospatric who was killed at the battle of the Standard in 1138.
- Waltheof, Lord of Allerdale and Abbot of Crowland
- Ethelreda (Ethreda), married Duncan II of Scotland, the son of Malcolm III of Scotland; mother of William fitz Duncan; also married to Waltheof, son of Gillemin.
- Matilda/Matilla married Dolfin, son of Aylward
- Gunhilda (Gunnild), married Orm of Workington, son of Ketil

== In balladry and literature ==
A ballad included in Walter Scott's Minstrelsy of the Scottish Border (1803) is concerned with Gospatric's ruthless search for a suitably virginal bride.

== Notes ==
Peerage of England
Preceded by Osulf	Earl of Northumbria; 1067–1068	Succeeded by Robert Comine
Preceded by Robert Comine	Earl of Northumbria; 1069–1072	Succeeded by Waltheof
