= Ethelreda (daughter of Gospatric) =

Queen of Scotland in 1094

Queen consort of Alba (Scotland)
- Tenure: 1094
- Spouse: Duncan II; Waltheof son of Gillemin
- Issue: William fitz Duncan
- Father: Gospatric, Earl of Northumbria

Ethelreda, Etheldreda or Ethreda was a daughter of Gospatric, Earl of Northumbria remembered in 13th century Cumberland as the mother of William fitz Duncan.

She married Duncan II, King of Scots. Ethelreda was Queen of Scots for about six months in 1094, until Duncan's death on 12 November 1094.

After Duncan was killed by Mormaer Máel Petair of Mearns, it is probable that Ethelreda fled with at least one child, William fitz Duncan, to the safety of Allerdale in Cumberland, where her brother Waltheof was lord.

The Chronicon Cumbriæ reports that Waltheof granted Broughton, Ribton and Little Broughton jointly to his sister Ethelreda and Waltheof, son of Gillemin, who would be another husband. More of Waltheof of Allerdale's lands would eventually be inherited by Ethelreda's son William fitz Duncan.

Scottish royalty
Unknown Title last held by Margaret of Wessex	Queens consort of Scotland; 1094	Succeeded by Sybilla of Normandy
