= Battle of Clitheroe =

1138 battle between Scotland and England

Coordinates: 53.873°N 2.391°W

- Part of the Anarchy
Date	10 June 1138
Location	near Bowland Fells in Lancashire
Result	Scottish victory

Belligerents
Kingdom of England	Kingdom of Scotland

Commanders and leaders
Unknown	William fitz Duncan

The Battle of Clitheroe was a battle between a force of Scots and English knights and men at arms which took place on 10 June 1138 during the period of The Anarchy. The battle was fought on the southern edge of the Bowland Fells, at Clitheroe, Lancashire.

== Background ==
During the civil war in England known as The Anarchy, King David I of Scotland chose to fight for his niece, Matilda. At this time, David was also known to be attempting to absorb Northumberland into Scotland. To these ends David led a Scottish army into Northumberland in early 1138, carefully avoiding battle with the forces led by King Stephen of England, until King Stephen was forced to retire south. This left David free to resume his invasion, which he did, crossing into Northumberland on 15 April and laying siege to Norham Castle.

It was around the time of the siege of Norham castle that William fitz Duncan, the Mormaer of Moray, was placed in command of a part of the Scottish forces, including a contingent of Galwegians, and was sent to raid into the lands of Craven and Clitheroe.

== Battle ==
Not much is known about the battle itself. What is known is that the Scottish forces led by William fitz Duncan encountered a heavily armoured English army in chainmail and helmets near the river Ribble on 10 June. It is also said that the men of Galloway played a large part in the battle for the Scottish army. These men were known to be lightly armed and armoured, and renowned for their ferocious charges at the enemy.

The battle resulted in a victory for the Scottish army, with English sources saying the river Ribble ran red with blood.

== Aftermath ==
After the battle of Clitheroe the Scottish army rampaged around the land, killing many and enslaving others.

Later, William fitz Duncan and his men rejoined the main Scottish army in time for the Battle of the Standard, near Northallerton, on 22 August, which was a victory for the English army. However, the lands that became Lancashire remained a Scottish vassal for a brief period before returning to England.
