= Political and military events in Scotland during the reign of David I =

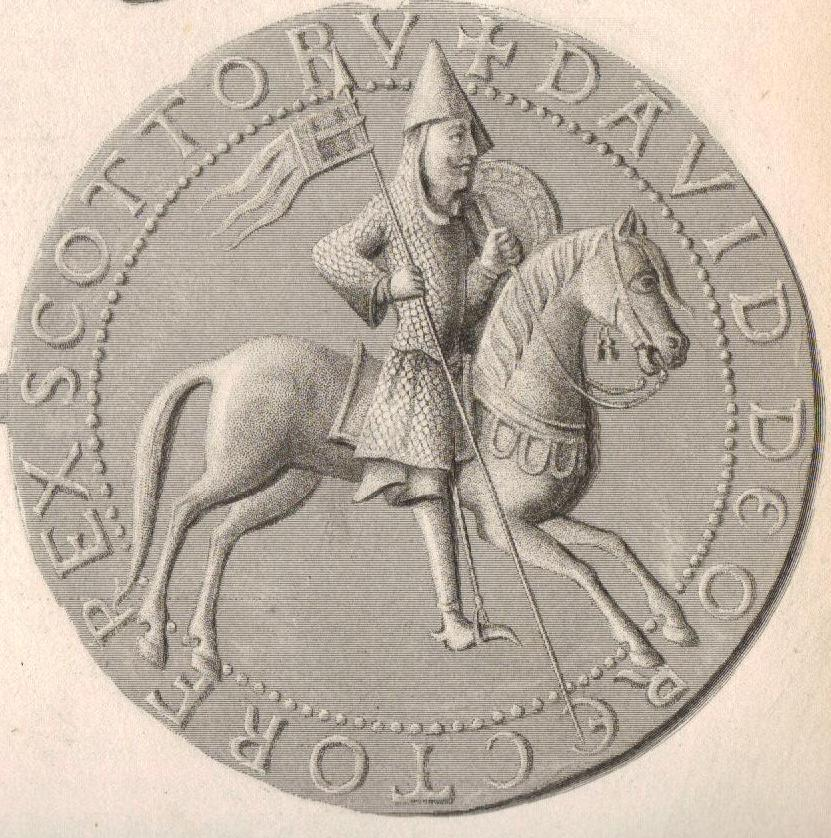
Steel engraving and enhancement of the reverse side of the Great Seal of David I, a picture in the Anglo-Continental style depicting David as a warrior leader.

Political and military events in Scotland during the reign of David I are the events which took place in Scotland during David I of Scotland's reign as King of Scots, from 1124 to 1153. When his brother Alexander I of Scotland died in 1124, David chose, with the backing of Henry I of England, to take the Kingdom of Alba for himself. David was forced to engage in warfare against his rival and nephew, Máel Coluim mac Alaxandair. Subduing the latter took David ten years, and involved the destruction of Óengus, mormaer of Moray. David's victory allowed him to expand his control over more distant regions theoretically part of the Kingdom. In this he was largely successful, although he failed to bring the Earldom of Orkney into his kingdom.

== Overview ==
Both Michael Lynch and Richard Oram portray David as having little initial connection with the culture and society of the Scots; Oram characterises David's position at his accession in 1124 as "a stranger in a strange land". Both historians likewise argue that David became increasingly re-Gaelicized in the later stages of his reign. Other historians, such as R. Andrew McDonald for instance, focus on the violence of David's "Norman" establishment, and partially explain David's troubles in Scotland as non-Celtic tension against the "Celtic" periphery. The latter Norman-Celtic dualistic picture is attacked by Matthew Hammond, who asks why the Gaelic east of the kingdom which constituted David's Scotian heartland was less "Celtic" than the heavily Norse-influenced west and north.

In fact, as king of Scots David pursued the goals anyone in his position would be expected to pursue. While it is true that David established himself in power with the backing of Henry I and his own Anglo-Norman retainers, as king his expansion also impinged upon areas that were Norse and English in speech using forces taken from his own Gaelic territories. David used the forces at his disposal. In doing so David's position in Scotland was largely successful. Not only did he survive to die a peaceful death, but he retained hold of his core territory in east-central Scotland, introduced more direct royal control into Moray and beyond, while men from Argyll, the Hebrides and Galloway were could be brought into David's 1136-8 invasion host. David's failings were that he did not succeed in permanently incorporating the Orkney Islands into his kingdom.

== David's position as heir to Scottish throne ==
However, David's claim to be heir to the Scottish kingdom was spurious. David was the youngest of eight sons of the fifth from last king. Two more recent kings had produced sons. William fitz Duncan, son of King Donnchad II, and Máel Coluim, son of the last king Alexander, both preceded David in terms of the slowly emerging principles of primogeniture. However, unlike David, neither William nor Máel Coluim had the support of Henry, and both were claimed to be illegitimate. The death in 1122 of Sibylla, daughter of King Henry and wife of King Alexander, increased David's prospects of becoming King, which in turn made David even more important to Henry; it was probably for this reason that King Henry strengthened his military presence in the north of England at this point in time. This act was probably designed to make Alexander acknowledge David as heir, or at least to intimidate Alexander's vassals for this same purpose. So when Alexander died in 1124, the Gaelic aristocracy of Scotland had no choice but to accept David as King, or face war with both David and Henry I.

== 1st war against Máel Coluim mac Alaxandair ==
Alexander's son Máel Coluim chose war. Orderic Vitalis reports that Máel Coluim mac Alaxandair "affected to snatch the kingdom from [David], and fought against him two sufficiently fierce battles; but David, who was loftier in understanding and in power and wealth, conquered him and his followers". The revolt may have involved the death of David's eldest son. Before recounting the war against Máel Coluim, Orderic Vitalis reported the death of this son at the hands of an exiled Norwegian priest; but Orderic's account is so obscure that it is difficult to make anything of it. The priest was reportedly a member of David's household, and was put to death by being bound to the tails of four horses. Whether or not the two events were connected, Máel Coluim escaped unharmed into areas of Scotland not yet under David's control, and there gained shelter and some measure of support; when Máel Coluim mac Alaxandair renewed his claim to the throne six years later, he had the support and protection of the king of Moray.

== Royal coronation and the Scots ==
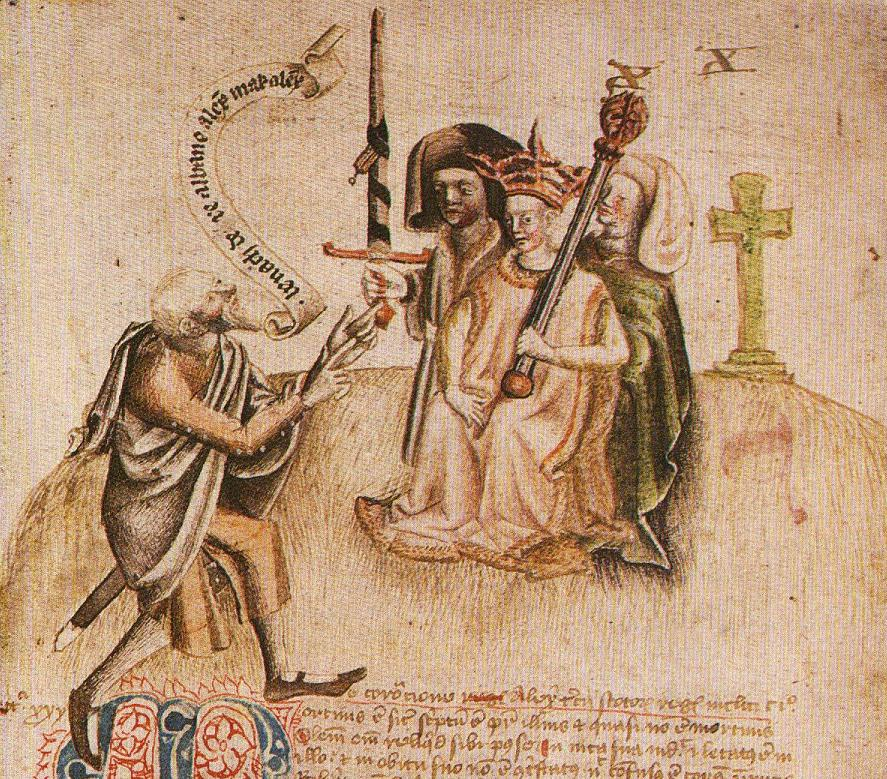
This illustration from a late medieval MS of Walter Bower's Scotichronicon depicts the royal inauguration of David's great-great-grandson Alexander III of Scotland, Scone, 1249. Scone was the ancient royal centre and coronation site of Scotland's kings. Alexander is being greeted by the ollamh rígh, the royal poet, who is addressing him with the proclamation "Benach De Re Albanne" (= Beannachd Dé Rígh Alban, "God Bless the King of Scotland"); the poet goes on to recite Alexander's genealogy. David would have experienced a similar inauguration.

In either April or May of the same year David was crowned King of Scots (Gaelic: rí(gh) Alban; Latin: rex Scottorum) at Scone. If later Scottish and Irish evidence can be taken as evidence, the ceremony of coronation was a series of elaborate traditional rituals, of the kind infamous in the Anglo-French world of the 12th century for their "unchristian" elements. Ailred of Rievaulx, friend and one time member of David's court, reported that David "so abhorred those acts of homage which are offered by the Scottish nation in the manner of their fathers upon the recent promotion of their kings, that he was with difficulty compelled by the bishops to receive them".

Whatever David thought of his childhood homeland, the Anglo-Norman historians were clearly convinced that he had little cultural or social connection to it in 1124. David remained an absentee king for much of his early reign in Scotland-proper. In his first act as king he made a grant or perhaps a reaffirmation of a previous grant to one of his followers, Robert de Brus, of the lordship of Annandale, on the frontier between his old principality and the lands of "Galloway":

"David, by the grace of God King of Scots, to all his barons, men and friends, English and French, greetings. Know you that I have given and granted to Robert de Brus Ystrad Annan (Annandale) and all the land from the boundary of Dunegal of Srath Nid (Nithsdale) to the boundary of Randolph le Meschin; and I will and grant that he should hold and have that land and its castle well and honourably with all its customs which Ranulph le Meschin ever had in Carduill (Carlisle) and in his land of Cumberland on that day in which he had them most fully and freely. Witnesses: Eustace fitz John, Hugh de Morville, Alan de Perci, William de Somerville, Berengar Engaine, Randolf de Sules, William de Morville, Hervi fitz Warin and Edmund the chamberlain. At Scone."

This charter addresses only his "English and French" followers, and the witness list contains the names of eight Frenchmen and one Englishman; there are no Scots. By contrast, the witnesses to the charters of Alexander I issued in Scotland-proper are virtually all Gaels. In 1124 then, it is possible to argue that David felt he could depend on Frenchmen and Englishmen only. It would take some time for David to reestablish himself in the country and people of his early childhood.

== 2nd war against Máel Coluim mac Alaxandair ==
In this period David was busy in some of his Scottish lands and was becoming more intimate with his native Scottish subjects. David, however, spent several long periods resident in England. In fact, outside his "Cumbrian" principality and the southern fringe of Scotland-proper, David still exercised little power, and in the words of Richard Oram, was "king of Scots in little more than name". He was probably in the part of Scotland he did rule for most of the time between late 1127 and 1130, but was at the court of Henry in 1126 and early 1127, and returned to Henry's court in 1130 serving as a judge at Woodstock for the treason trial of Geoffrey de Clinton. It was in this year that David's wife, Matilda de Senlis, died. Possibly as a result of this, and while David was still in southern England, Scotland-proper rose up in arms against him.

The instigator was his nephew Máel Coluim, who now had the support of Óengus of Moray, King or Mormaer of Moray. King Óengus was David's most powerful "vassal", a man who, as grandson of King Lulach of Scotland, even had his own claim to the kingdom. The rebel Scots had advanced into Angus when they were met by David's Mercian constable, Edward; a battle took place at Stracathro near Brechin. According to the Annals of Ulster, 1000 of Edward's army, and 4000 of Óengus' army, including Óengus himself, died. According to Orderic Vitalis, Edward followed up the killing of Óengus by marching north into Moray itself, which, in his words, "lacked a defender and lord"; and so Edward, "with God's help obtained the entire duchy of that extensive district". However, this was far from the end of it. Máel Coluim again escaped, and four years of this continuing Scottish "civil war" followed; for David this period was quite simply a "struggle for survival".

It appears that David applied for and obtained extensive military aid from his patron, King Henry. Ailred of Rievaulx relates that at this point a large fleet and a large army of Norman knights, including Walter l'Espec, and were sent by Henry to Carlisle to assist in David's attempt to root out his Scottish enemies. The fleet seems to have been used in the Irish Sea, the Firth of Clyde and the entire Argyll coast, where Máel Coluim was probably at large among supporters. By 1134 Máel Coluim was captured and imprisoned in Roxburgh Castle.

== Pacification of the west and north ==
Richard Oram puts forward the suggestion that it was during this period, rather than earlier, that David granted Walter fitz Alan the kadrez of Strathgryfe, with northern Kyle and the area around Renfrew, forming what would become the "Stewart" lordship of Strathgryfe; he also suggests that Hugh de Morville may have gained the kadrez of Cunningham and the settlement of "Strathyrewen" (i.e. Irvine). This would indicate that the 1130–34 campaign had resulted in the acquisition of these territories. The effect was to bring the presence of Anglo-Norman lords loyal to David into a peripheral Gaelic-speaking zone over which David had been previously little able to control, and to act as a barrier to and method of controlling the more distant provinces of Argyll and Galloway. Additionally, there is good reason to suspect that King Fergus of Galloway was brought into David's sphere of influence. At any rate, Fergus was married to an illegitimate daughter of Henry and was thus, like David, part of Henry network of allies.

How long it took to pacify Moray is not known, but in this period it is now thought that David appointed his nephew William fitz Duncan to succeed Óengus, perhaps in compensation for the exclusion from the succession to the Scottish throne caused by the coming of age of David's son Henry. At the same time David founded the burghs of Elgin and Forres, with castles alongside. William may have been given the daughter of Óengus in marriage, cementing his authority in the region. David also founded in the lands of Moray Urquhart Priory, possibly as a "victory monastery", and assigned to it a percentage of his cain (tribute) from Argyll. During this period too, a marriage was arranged between the son of Matad, mormaer of Atholl, and the daughter of Haakon Paulsson, earl of Orkney. The marriage temporarily secured the northern frontier of the Kingdom, and held out the prospect of a son of one of David's mormaers gaining Orkney and Caithness for the Kingdom of Alba. Thus, by the time the man who made all this possible for David, Henry Beauclerc, died on 1 December 1135, David had Scotland under control for the first time.

== Dominating the north ==
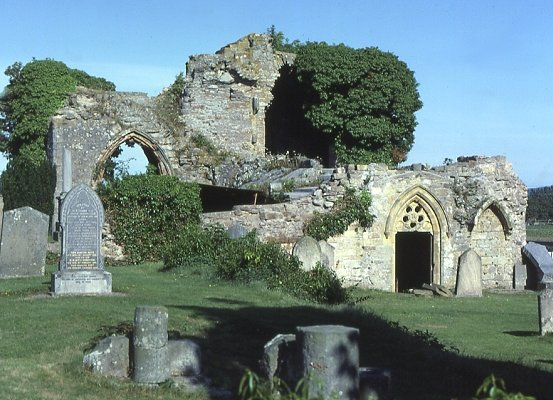
The ruins of Kinloss Abbey in Moray, founded by David in 1150 by a colony of Melrose Cistercians.

While fighting King Stephen and attempting to dominate northern England in the following years, David was continuing his drive for control of the far north of Scotland. In 1139, his domination of Caithness (then including Sutherland) was confirmed when his cousin, the five-year-old Harald Maddadsson, was given the title of earl and half the lands of the earldom of Orkney, in addition to Scottish Caithness. Throughout the 1140s Caithness and Sutherland were brought back under the Scottish zone of control. Sometime before 1146, David appointed a native Scot called Aindréas to be the first bishop of Caithness, a bishopric which was based at Halkirk, near Thurso, in an area which was ethnically Scandinavian.

David soon found himself active and personally present in the north of Scotland because of the death of his cousin William fitz Duncan. William died sometime between 1147 and 1151, putting the huge lordship of Moray back into David's hands. David was in the north in the year 1150, founding Kinloss Abbey, while at the same time establishing new and reinforcing old castles which formed a line running from Banff on the borders of the mormaerdom of Buchan to Inverness. At about this time, or perhaps in the following year, David visited Aberdeen. This visit is recorded in the notitiae on the margins of the Book of Deer. All of the witnesses, mormaers, bishops and lower-ranking landlords, were Gaels with interests in the north of Scotland. The charter in question was a grant to the old monastery of Deer of exemption from all kinds of lay exactions. Later in the year, a charter issued at Dunfermline in favour of the new abbey church there records the presence at David's court of the most notable Gaelic magnates and church officials of the north, namely Gartnait, mormaer of Buchan, Morggán, mormaer of Mar, Aindréas, bishop of Caithness, Symeon, bishop of Ross and Edward, bishop of Aberdeen. These activities and pieces of charter evidence are enough to show that consolidation of royal authority there was David's biggest priority in the first years of the 1150s.

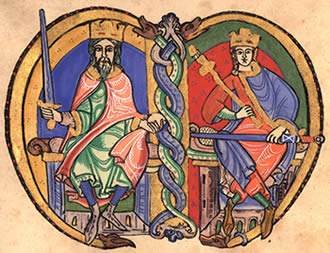
David alongside his designated successor, Máel Coluim mac Eanric. Máel Coluim IV would reign for 12 years, in a reign marked for the young king's chastity and religious fervour. He became known as "Malcolm the Maiden", and was styled by one Gaelic annalist as "the best Christian that was of the Gaidhil [who dwell] by the sea on the east"

In 1150, it looked like Caithness and the whole earldom of Orkney were going to come under permanent Scottish control. However, David's plans for the north soon began to encounter problems. In 1151, King Eystein II of Norway put a spanner in the works by sailing through the waterways of Orkney with a large fleet and catching the young Harald unawares in his residence at Thurso. Eystein forced Harald to pay fealty as a condition of his release. Later in the year David hastily responded by supporting the claims to the Orkney earldom of Harald's rival Erlend Haraldsson, granting him half of Caithness in opposition to Harald. King Eystein responded in turn by making a similar grant to this same Erlend, cancelling the effect of David's grant. David's weakness in Orkney was that the Norwegian kings were not prepared to stand back and let David reduce their power.

== Death and succession ==
Perhaps the greatest blow to David's plans came on 12 July 1152, when Henry, Earl of Northumberland, David's only son and successor, died, although Henry might have been ill for some time before. David himself had under a year to live, and may have known that he himself was not going to live much longer. David quickly arranged for his grandson Máel Coluim to be made his successor, and for his younger grandson William to be made Earl of Northumberland. Donnchad I, mormaer of Fife, the senior Gaelic magnate in Scotland-proper, was appointed as rector, or regent, and made to take the 11-year-old Máel Coluim around Scotland-proper on a tour to meet and gain the homage of his future subjects. David's health began to fail seriously in the Spring of 1153 and he died on 24 May 1153. In his obituary in the Annals of Tigernach, he is called Dabíd mac Mail Colaim, rí Alban & Saxan, "David, son of Máel Coluim, King of Scotland and England", a title which acknowledged the new Scoto-Northumbrian identity of David's realm.
