= Robert de Comines =

11th-century Flemish noble in England

- Died: 28 January 1069; Durham, County Durham, England
- Other names: de Comyn, Cummins, de Comin, de Cumin, de Commines
- Title: Earl of Northumbria
- Term: 1068–1069

Robert de Comines (died 28 January 1069) was briefly Earl of Northumbria. His violent death was one of the key events that led to the Harrying of the North.

== Life ==
Little is known of Robert, but his name suggests that he originally came from Comines, then in the County of Flanders, and entered the following of William the Conqueror.

The English earl Gospatric joined a major rebellion against William in 1068 and de Comines was sent from Gloucester to the north in order to replace him as earl. Robert reached Durham unopposed with between 500 and 900 men, where the bishop, Æthelwine, warned him that an army was mobilised against him and advised him not to enter the city. He ignored the warning and, on 28 January 1069, the rebels breached Durham's city gates and killed many of his men in the streets, eventually setting fire to the bishop's house in which Robert had taken refuge and where he died.

After this attack, Æthelwine turned against the Normans and gathered an army in Durham before marching on York, one of the events that led to the Harrying of the North in retaliation by King William's army.

== Issue ==
Robert de Comines could be the father of:

- John de Comyn (died c. 1135), killed during The Anarchy, married the daughter and co-heiress of Adam Giffard of Fonthill, had issue, and;
- William de Comyn (Cumin) (died c. 1158), Lord Chancellor to David I of Scotland, disputed Bishop of Durham (1141–1143) and Archdeacon of Worcester in 1125 and 1157.

== Sources ==
- Creighton, Mandell (1887). "Comin, Robert de" . In Stephen, Leslie (ed.). Dictionary of National Biography. Vol. 11. London: Smith, Elder & Co. p. 440.
- Douglas, David C. (1964). William the Conqueror: The Norman Impact Upon England.
- Morris, Marc (2012). The Norman Conquest: The Battle of Hastings and the Fall of Anglo-Saxon England. ISBN 978-1-4481-3602-5.
- Paul, James Balfour (1904–1914). The Scots peerage : founded on Wood's ed. of Sir Robert Douglas's Peerage of Scotland; containing an historical and genealogical account of the nobility of that kingdom. Robarts – University of Toronto. Edinburgh: D. Douglas.
- Stenton, Frank M. (1971). Anglo-Saxon England (3rd ed.). Oxford, UK: Oxford University Press. ISBN 0-19-821716-1.

Peerage of England
Preceded by Gospatric	Earl of Northumbria; 1068–1069	Succeeded by Gospatric
