= Meldred =

Legendary ruler in Arthurian tradition

Meldred is a character who appears in literary accounts of Sub-Roman Britain. He is portrayed as a chieftain who ruled part of what is now southern Scotland during the 6th century. A 12th-century text refers to a petty king named Meldredus who ruled in Tweeddale. The village of Drumelzier in Peeblesshire may take its name from him, and his seat of power may have been the fort of Tinnis Castle. He is a character in the literary tradition on which the Arthurian romances are based and has been suggested as the earliest named political leader associated with the Anglo-Scottish border in the post-Roman period.

== Death of Lailoken ==
In Vita Merlini Silvestris, a 12th-century source text for the literary character Merlin, Meldred appears as the captor of Lailoken, a warrior so traumatised by the slaughter he witnesses at the Battle of Arfderydd in 573 that he retreats to the Great Wood of Caledon, where he lives as a wild man. Lailoken's madness endows him with the gift of prophecy, and Meldred holds him captive in his fortress at Drumeller in the hope of obtaining prophecies that he can use to his advantage. During negotiations over his release, Lailoken draws attention to a leaf caught in the queen's wimple, which he claims is evidence of an assignation with her lover in the king's garden. Lailoken secures his release, but the queen takes revenge for the revelation of her affair by arranging for him to be ambushed and killed by a group of shepherds. Meldred has Lailoken buried in the churchyard west of his fortress, near the confluence of the Powsail Burn (also called Drumelzier Burn) and the River Tweed.

== Maldred of Allerdale ==
The literary figure Meldred may have been inspired by the later historical figure Maldred (Middle Gaelic: Máel Doraid) of Allerdale, an 11th-century Cumbrian nobleman. Maldred is mentioned in De obsessione Dunelmi as a son of thegn Crínán, possibly Crínán of Dunkeld, abbot of Dunkeld; if so, he would have been a younger brother of King Duncan I of Scotland. Maldred and his wife Ealdgyth, a daughter of Uhtred the Bold and granddaughter of King Æthelred the Unready, were the parents of Gospatric, Earl of Northumbria, from whom the earls of Dunbar and the earls of Home descended.
