= Dolfin of Carlisle =

Anglo-Saxon magnate

Dolfin (fl. 1092) was an 11th-century magnate in Cumbria. His father was probably Gospatric, one of the most powerful regional figures in the mid-11th century having been earl of Northumbria in the early years of William the Conqueror's reign. Dolfin was the eldest of Gospatric's three sons, his younger brothers being Waltheof, lord of Allerdale, and Gospatric II, Earl of Lothian.

In 1092, according to the Anglo-Saxon Chronicle MS E, a Dolfin was expelled from Carlisle by William Rufus, king of England: William followed up by constructing a castle in the city, and importing settlers from England:

[s.a. 1092] In this year king William with a great army went north to Carlisle and restored the town and built the castle; and drove out Dolfin, who ruled the land there before. And he garrisoned the castle with his vassals; and thereafter came south hither and sent thither a great multitude of [churlish] folk with women and cattle, there to dwell and till the land.

From c. 1098, Ranulf le Meschin (future earl of Chester) was in charge of the region.

Although it is generally thought that this Dolfin was the son of Earl Gospatric, this has been occasionally disputed, notably by historian William Kapelle. Gospatric appears to have been ruler of Cumberland himself in the time of Earl Siward, though Alan Orr Anderson and others have suggested that Dolfin had been placed in the region by Malcolm III of Scotland.
