= Battle of the Standard =

1138 battle between England and Scotland

- Part of the Anarchy
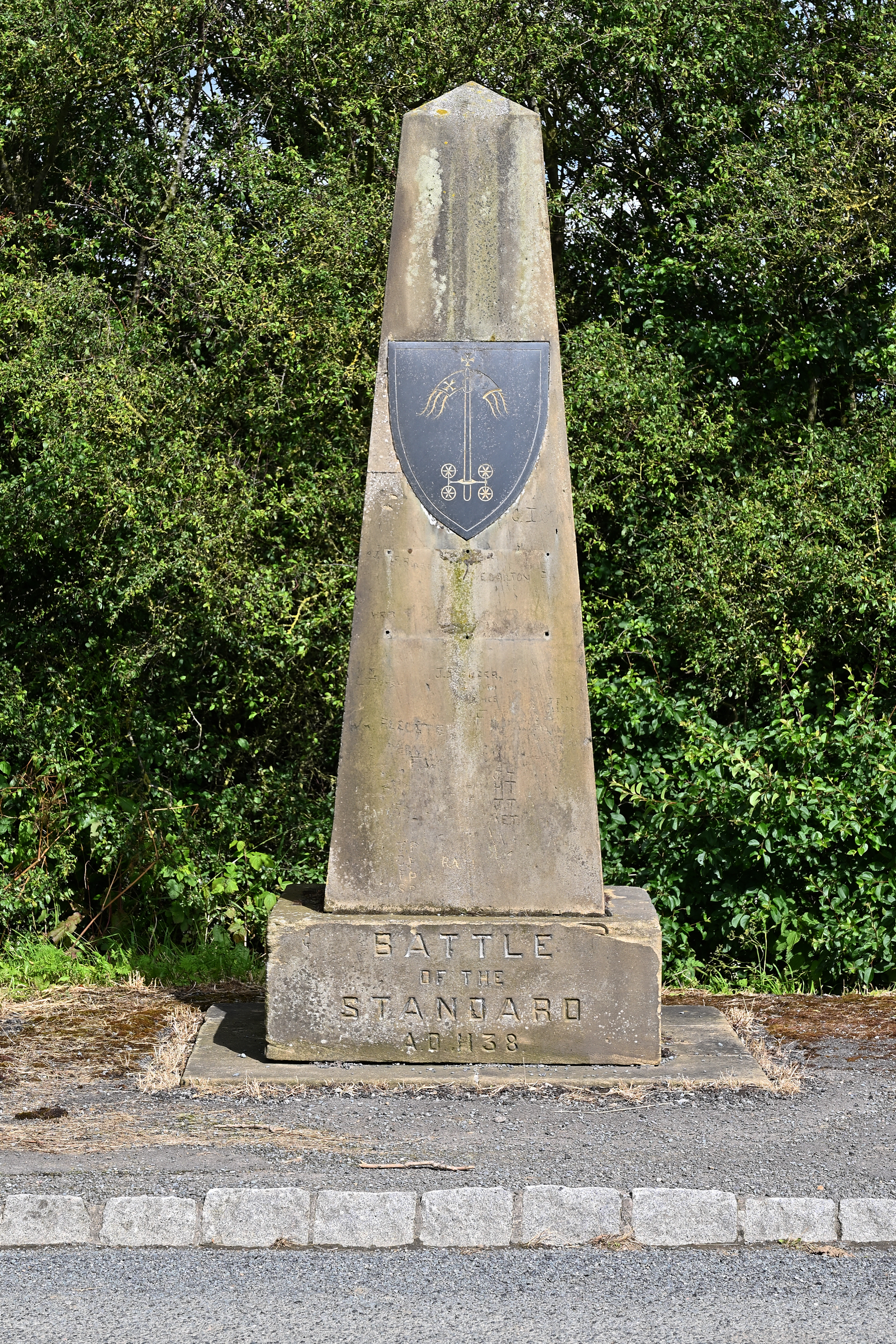
- Battlefield monument at grid reference SE360977
Date	22 August 1138
Location	Cowton Moor near Northallerton, Yorkshire 54°22′25″N 1°26′50″W
Result	English victory

Belligerents
Kingdom of England	Kingdom of Scotland

Commanders and leaders
William of Aumale	David I

Strength
~10,000	~16,000

Casualties and losses
Light	10,000–12,000
- Location within England

The Battle of the Standard, sometimes called the Battle of Northallerton, took place on 22 August 1138 on Cowton Moor near Northallerton in Yorkshire, England. English forces under William of Aumale repelled a Scottish army led by King David I of Scotland.

King Stephen of England, fighting rebel barons in the south, had sent a small force (largely mercenaries), but the English army was mainly local militia and baronial retinues from Yorkshire and the north Midlands. Archbishop Thurstan of York had exerted himself greatly to raise the army, preaching that to withstand the Scots was to do God's work. The centre of the English position was therefore marked by a mast (mounted upon a cart) bearing a pyx carrying the consecrated host and from which were flown the consecrated banners of the minsters of York, Beverley and Ripon: hence the name of the battle. This cart-mounted standard was a very northerly example of a type of standard common in contemporary Italy, where it was known as a carroccio.

King David had entered England for two declared reasons:

- To support his niece Matilda's claim to the English throne against that of King Stephen (married to another niece)
- To enlarge his kingdom beyond his previous gains.

David's forces had already taken much of Northumberland apart from castles at Wark and Bamburgh.

Advancing beyond the Tees towards York, early on 22 August the Scots found the English army drawn up on open fields 2 miles (3 km) north of Northallerton; they formed up in four 'lines' to attack it. The first attack, by unarmoured spearmen against armoured men (including dismounted knights) supported by telling fire from archers, failed. Within three hours, the Scots army disintegrated, apart from small bodies of knights and men-at-arms around David and his son Henry. At this point, Henry led a spirited attack with mounted knights; he and David then withdrew separately with their immediate companions in relatively good order. Heavy Scots losses are claimed, in battle and in flight.

The English did not pursue far; David fell back to Carlisle and reassembled an army. Within a month, a truce was negotiated which left the Scots free to continue the siege of Wark castle, which eventually fell. Despite losing the battle, David was subsequently given most of the territorial concessions he had been seeking (which the chronicles say he had been offered before he crossed the Tees). David held these throughout the Anarchy, but on the death of David, his successor Malcolm IV of Scotland was soon forced to surrender David's gains to Henry II of England.

Some chronicle accounts of the battle include an invented pre-battle speech on the glorious deeds of the Normans, occasionally quoted as good contemporary evidence of the high opinion the Normans held of themselves.

== Background ==
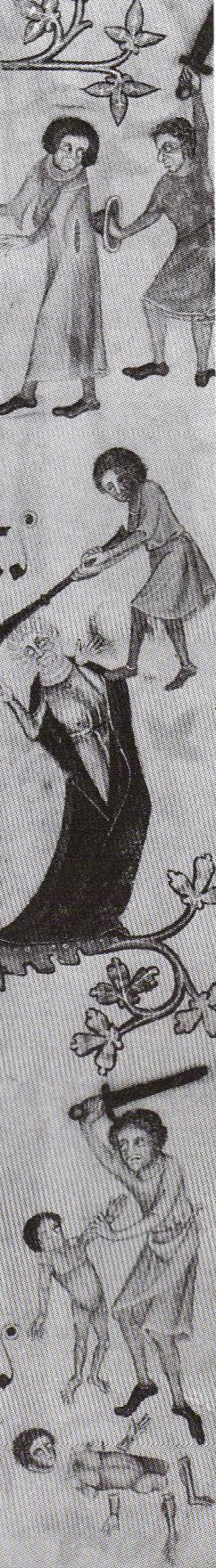
Scottish atrocities depicted in the 14th-century Luttrell Psalter

David had gained the Scottish throne largely because of the support of his brother-in-law Henry I of England, and he had attempted to remodel Scotland to be more like Henry's England. He had carried out peaceful changes in the areas of Scotland over which he had effective control and had conducted military campaigns against semi-autonomous regional rulers to reassert his authority; in administration, in warfare, and in the settling of regained territory, he had drawn on the talent and resources of the Anglo-Norman lands. The death of Henry I in 1135, weakening England, made David more reliant on his native subjects, and allowed him to contemplate winning control over substantial areas of northern England.

Henry I had wished his inheritance to pass to his daughter Matilda, and in 1127 made his notables swear an oath to uphold the succession of Matilda (David was the first layman to do so). Many of the English and Norman magnates and barons were against Matilda because she was married to Geoffrey V, count of Anjou. On Henry's death, Stephen, younger brother of Theobald, count of Blois, seized the throne instead.

When Stephen was crowned on 22 December, David went to war. After two months of campaigning in northern England, a peace treaty ceding Cumberland to David was agreed. Additionally, David's son Henry was made Earl of Huntingdon. David declined to swear the required oath of loyalty to Stephen, since he had already sworn allegiance to Matilda.

In spring 1137, David again invaded England: a truce was quickly agreed. In November, the truce expired; David demanded to be made earl of the whole of the old earldom of Northumberland. Stephen refused and in January 1138 David invaded for a third time.

== Campaigning in 1138 before the battle ==
=== David invades Northumberland ===
David first moved against English castles on the Tweed frontier. Norham Castle belonged to the Bishop of Durham and its garrison was under-strength; it quickly fell. Having failed to rapidly seize the castle at Wark on Tweed, David detached forces to besiege it and moved deeper into Northumberland, demanding contributions from settlements and religious establishments to be spared plunder and burning.

=== Scots slave-raiding and Anglo-Norman alarm ===
The actions of the army that invaded England in early 1138 shocked the English chroniclers. Richard of Hexham records that:

an execrable army, more atrocious than the pagans, neither fearing God nor regarding man, spread desolation over the whole province and slaughtered everywhere people of either sex, of every age and rank, destroying, pillaging and burning towns, churches and houses.

Monastic chroniclers often deplore depredations made by foreign armies and sometimes even those of their own rulers but some Scots forces were going beyond normal Norman 'harrying' by systematically carrying off women and children as slaves.

Remember what they did in the lands across the Tyne, and hope for nothing gentler if the Scots conquer. I am silent about the slaughter, the rapine, the fires that the enemy employed in something like a human way. I would tell such acts as no stories tell and no histories relate of the fiercest tyrants. I would tell them, I say, if words did not fail before such horror, or the listener flee. They spared no age, rank or sex. The high born, boys as well as girls were led into captivity

In contemporary Britain, this was regarded as a useful source of revenue, like (and not significantly more reprehensible than) cattle-raiding.

Then (horrible to relate) they carried off, like so much booty, the noble matrons and chaste virgins, together with other women. These naked, fettered, herded together; by whips and thongs they drove before them, goading them with their spears and other weapons. This took place in other wars, but in this to a far greater extent.

The practicalities of this would support the chroniclers' tales of sexual abuse of the slaves and casual slaughter of unsalable encumbrances:

For the sick on their couches, women pregnant and in childbed, infants in the womb, innocents at the breast, or on the mother's knee, with the mothers themselves, decrepit old men and worn-out old women, and persons debilitated from whatever cause, wherever they met with them, they put to the edge of the sword, and transfixed with their spears; and by how much more horrible a death they could dispatch them, so much the more did they rejoice."

In February, King Stephen marched north with an army to deal with David. David successfully evaded him, and Stephen returned south.

=== Scots raid into Craven and the Battle of Clitheroe ===
In the summer, David's nephew William fitz Duncan marched into Yorkshire and harried Craven; on 10 June, he met and defeated an English force of knights and men-at-arms at the battle of Clitheroe. He also destroyed the recently founded Calder Abbey in Copeland. The choice of targets has no obvious strategic logic; it may be pertinent that William eventually inherited both the Honour of Skipton in Craven, and the Lordship of Copeland, previously held by his father-in-law William de Meschines and which should have passed to him on the death of William de Meschines' son Ranulph Meschin, the founder of Calder.

=== Peace feelers fail; David enters Yorkshire ===
By late July David had crossed the river Tyne and was in "St Cuthbert's land" (the lands of the Bishop of Durham). With him were contingents from most of the separate regions of his kingdom, amounting to more than 26,000 men (many sources say this is wrong, that it was more like 16,000). Eustace fitz John had declared for David and handed over to him Alnwick Castle in Northumberland. The garrison of Eustace's castle at Malton to the North East of York began to raid surrounding areas in support of David (or Matilda).

The magnates of Yorkshire gathered in York to discuss the worsening crisis:

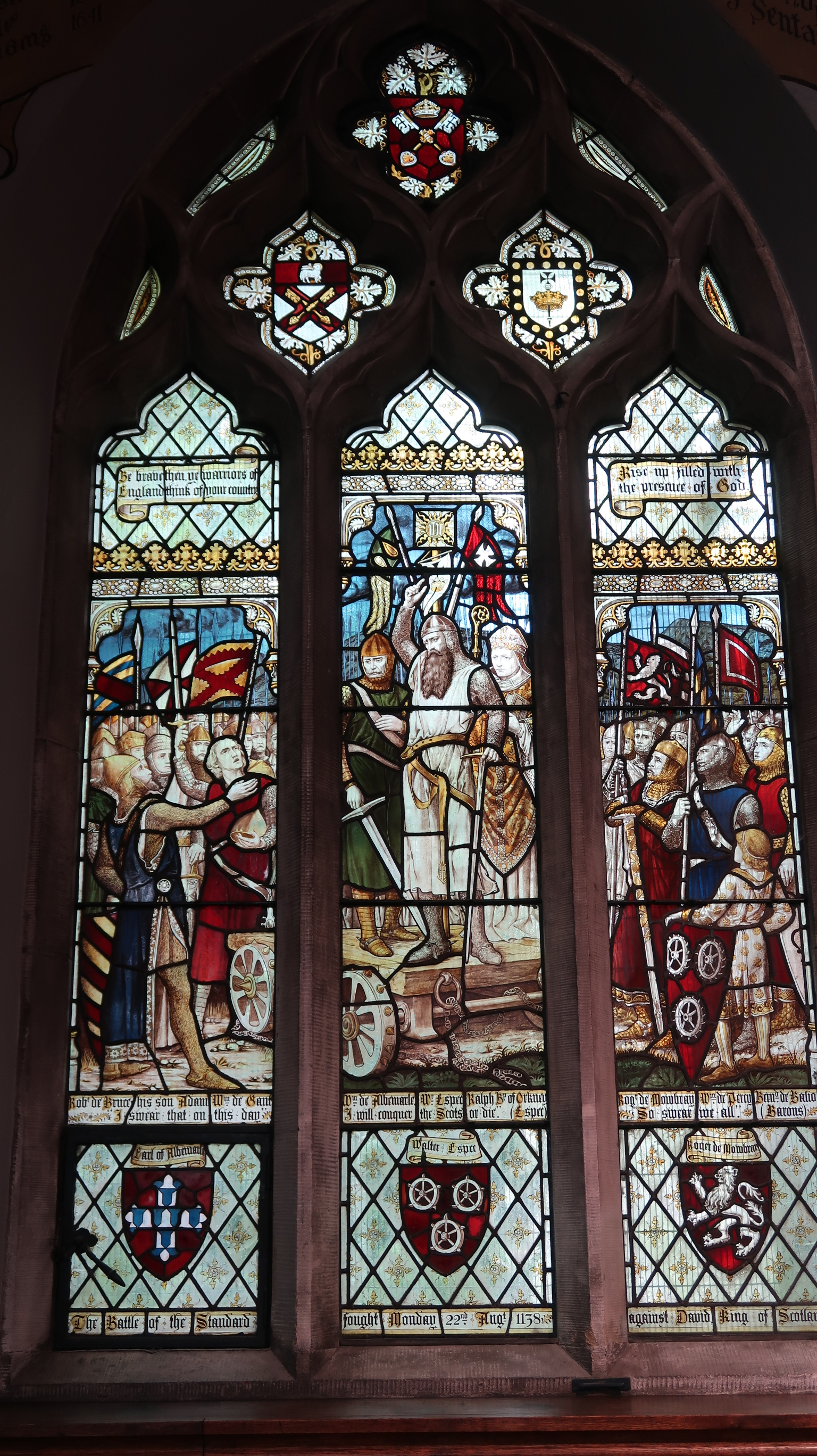
The Battle of the Standard window in All Saints Church in Helmsley, England, showing the arms of the Earl of Albemarle, Walter Espec and Roger de Mowbray at the bottom.

Archbishop Thurstan of York (who, as will presently appear, greatly exerted himself in this emergency), William of Aumale, Walter de Gant, Robert de Brus, Roger de Mowbray, Walter Espec, Ilbert de Lacy, William de Percy, Richard de Courcy, William Fossard, Robert de Stuteville
Much irresolution was caused by distrust of each other, arising from suspicions of treachery, by the absence of a chief and leader of the war (for their sovereign, king Stephen, encompassed by equal difficulties in the south of England, was just then unable to join them), and by their dread of encountering, with an inadequate force, so great a host

However, urged by the 70-year-old Thurstan ('Lieutenant of the North' in addition to his ecclesiastical duties; Walter Espec was High Sheriff of Yorkshire), to stand and fight and if needs be die in a holy cause, they agreed to gather their forces and return to York, where they were joined by reinforcements from Nottinghamshire under William Peverel and Geoffrey Halsalin, and from Derbyshire led by Robert de Ferrers. They advanced to Thirsk, from where they sent Robert de Brus and Bernard de Balliol (recently arrived with a few mercenaries sent by King Stephen) on an embassy to David, whose army was now approaching the River Tees and North Yorkshire.

The emissaries promised to obtain the earldom of Northumberland for Henry, if the Scots army withdrew. Ailred of Rievaulx gives de Brus a speech in which he tells David that the English and the Normans have always been his true friends (against the Gaels), and without their help he may not be able to keep his kingdom together. Whatever was initially said, it ended in hard words being exchanged. Having failed to persuade David to withdraw, the emissaries returned to Thirsk, with de Brus angrily withdrawing his homage to David. David's forces crossed the Tees and moved south. The English forces moved northwards and took up a defensive position to the north of Northallerton.

=== Battlefield and English dispositions ===
Moving south from the Tees David's army would have had the high ground of the North Yorkshire Moors on its left, and the River Swale on its right. Nearing Northallerton, the distance between hills and river is about 8 miles (13 km), much of it low-lying and (then) poorly drained. The road to Northallerton from the Tees (the Great North Road) therefore approaches the town along a ridge of slightly higher ground running north–south. Minor ups and downs break the line of sight along the ridge, but the 'ups' are hills only in relation to the low ground on either side of the ridge. The English army deployed across this ridge about 2 miles (3 km) north of Northallerton in a single solid formation with the armoured men and most of the knights (who had dismounted, and sent their horses to the rear) to the front supported by the archers and the more lightly equipped men of the local levies. The barons stood with the remaining dismounted knights at the centre of the line around the standard. Their left is thought to have straddled the road, with its flank protected by a marsh; it is not known if the low ground to the east of the ridge was similarly boggy, or if the English formation extended that far.

=== Scots arrive and deploy ===
John of Worcester says that David intended to take the English by surprise, there being a very close mist that day. Richard of Hexham says simply that the Scots became aware of the standard (and by implication the army underneath it) at no great distance.

In front of the battle were the Picts [ie the Galwegians]; in the centre, the king with his knights and English; the rest of the barbarian host poured roaring around them. The king and almost all his followers were on foot, their horses being kept at a distance."

Ailred of Rievaulx gives the eventual deployment of the Scots as being in four 'lines'. The Galwegians [from Galloway in south-west Scotland] – described by a later chronicler as "men agile, unclothed, remarkable for much baldness [shaven heads?]; arming their left side with knives formidable to any armed men, having a hand most skillful at throwing spears and directing them from a distance; raising their long lance as a standard when they advance into battle" – were in the first line. "The second line the King's son Prince Henry arranged with great wisdom; with himself the knights and archers, adding to their number the Cumbrians and Teviotdalesmen ... The men of Lothian formed the third rank, with the islanders and the men of Lorne [in the South-West Highlands]. The King kept in his own line the Scots and Moravians [men from Moray in North-East Scotland]; several also of the English and French knights he appointed as his bodyguard."

Henry of Huntingdon's account of the battle would imply that the men of Lothian with their 'long spears' were in the first line; however, the generally accepted view is that the long spears were those of the Galwegians.

=== Scots argue ===
Ailred says (but this may be a literary device) that this order of battle was decided at the last minute; David had intended to attack first with his knights and armoured men-at-arms, but had faced strong protests from the Galwegians that they should be given the honour of attacking first, since they had already demonstrated at Clitheroe that the vigour of their attack was sufficient to rout Normans in armour. David, however, paid more attention to the counter-argument of his Normans; that if the Galwegians failed the rest of the army would lose heart. The Galwegians resumed their protest, and the debate was not aided by a mormaer (one of David's native 'great lords') asking why David listened to 'foreigners' when none of those with armour on would this day outdo the mormaer who wore no armour.

And Alan de Percy, base-born son of the great Alan – a most vigorous knight, and in military matters highly distinguished – took these words ill; and turning to the earl he said, 'A great word hast thou spoken, and one which for thy life thou canst not make good this day.' Then the king, restraining both, lest a disturbance should suddenly arise out of this altercation, yielded to the will of the Galwegians.

=== Anglo-Normans orate ===
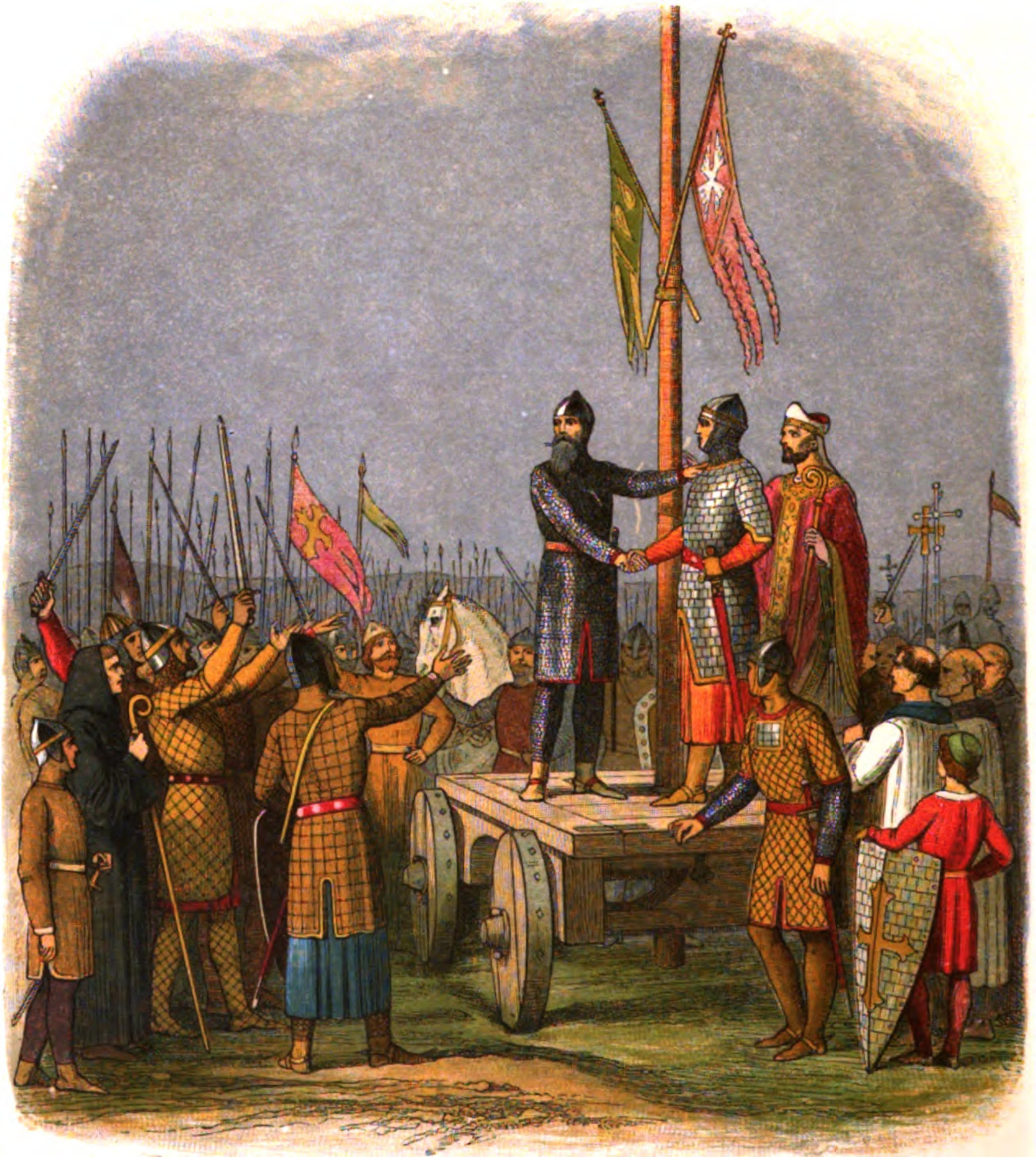
19th-century illustration: Walter Espec swears to conquer or be killed by the Scots, while shaking the hand of William of Aumale

Both Ailred and Henry of Huntingdon report a speech made to the Anglo-Normans before battle was joined. The speech may well be a literary device of the chroniclers, to present the reasons why it was fit and proper that the Normans should win, rather than accurate reportage of an actual speech. Ailred of Rievaulx says the speech was made by Walter Espec, Sheriff of York (and founder of Rievaulx). Henry of Huntingdon and after him Roger of Hoveden say the speech was made by Radulf Novell, bishop of Orkney as the representative of Thurstan.

The speaker first reminds the Normans of the military prowess of their race (especially when compared to the Scots):

Most illustrious nobles of England, Normans by birth, ... consider who you are, and against whom, and where it is, you are waging war; for then no one shall with impunity resist your prowess. Bold France, taught by experience, has quailed beneath your valour, fierce England, led captive, has submitted to you; rich Apulia, on having you for her masters, has flourished once again; Jerusalem so famed, and illustrious Antioch, have bowed themselves before you; and now Scotland, which of right is subject to you, attempts to show resistance, displaying a temerity not warranted by her arms, more fitted indeed for rioting than for battle. These are people, in fact, who have no knowledge of military matters, no skill in fighting, no moderation in ruling. There is no room then left for fear, but rather for shame, that those whom we have always sought on their own soil and overcome ..have ...come flocking into our country."

He next assures them that God has chosen them to punish the Scots:

This .. has been brought about by Divine Providence; in order that those who have in this country violated the temples of God, stained the altars with blood, slain his priests, spared neither children nor pregnant women, may on the same spot receive the condign punishment of their crimes; and this most just resolve of the Divine will, God will this day put in execution by means of your hands. Arouse your spirits then, ye civilized warriors, and, firmly relying on the valour of your country, nay, rather on the presence of God, arise against these most unrighteous foes"

Any keenness of the Scots to attack is because they don't understand the superiority of Norman equipment:

And let not their rashness move you, because so many insignia of your valour cause no alarm to them. They know not how to arm themselves for battle; whereas you, during the time of peace, prepare yourselves for war, in order that in battle you may not experience the doubtful contingencies of warfare. Cover your heads then with the helmet, your breasts with the coat of mail, your legs with the greaves, and your bodies with the shield, that so the foeman may not find where to strike at you, on seeing you thus surrounded on every side with iron."

Furthermore, the Scots' advantage in numbers is no advantage at all, especially when they are up against properly trained Norman knights:

[I]t is not so much the numbers of the many as the valour of the few that gains the battle. For a multitude unused to discipline is a hindrance to itself, when successful, in completing the victory, when routed, in taking to flight. Besides your forefathers, when but few in number, have many a time conquered multitudes; what then is the natural consequence of the glories of your ancestry, your constant exercises, your military discipline, but that though fewer in number, you should overcome multitudes?"

These preliminaries over, the battle began.

== Battle ==
=== Galwegian attack is held and fails ===
The battle began with a charge by the Galwegian spearmen who

after their custom gave vent thrice to a yell of horrible sound, and attacked the southerns in such an onslaught that they compelled the first spearmen to forsake their post; but they were driven off again by the strength of the knights, and [the spearmen] recovered their courage and strength against the foe. And when the frailty of the Scottish lances was mocked by the denseness of iron and wood they drew their swords and attempted to contend at close quarters"

The English archery caused disorganisation and heavy casualties in the Scottish ranks. Ailred records the bravery and determination of the Galwegians, together with its ineffectiveness:

like a hedgehog with its quill, so would you see a Galwegian bristling all round with arrows, and nonetheless brandishing his sword, and in blind madness rushing forward now smite a foe, now lash the air with useless strokes.

The Galwegians finally fled after the death of two of their leaders (Domnall and Ulgric); the men of Lothian similarly broke after the earl of Lothian was killed by an arrow

=== The King retreats; Prince Henry attacks ===
David wished to stand and fight, but was forced onto his horse and compelled to retire by his friends. Ailred simply says that the English were advancing; Henry of Huntingdon says that David's 'line' had been progressively melting away. Prince Henry led mounted men in a charge on the Anglo-Norman position, as or just after the Scots foot broke. According to Ailred, Henry successfully broke through and attacked the horse-holders in the rear of the Anglo-Norman position; the 'unarmed men' (i.e. unarmoured men) were dispersed, and only rallied by a claim that the Scottish king was dead. Since Prince Henry was unsupported and the rest of the army was withdrawing, for the most part in great disorder, he hid any banners showing his party to be Scottish, and retreated towards David by joining the English pursuing him. Henry of Huntingdon is keener to stress Henry's inability to shake the armoured men; again the attack ends in flight:

Next, the king's troop ... began to drop off, at first; man by man, and afterwards in bodies, the king standing firm, and being at last left almost alone. The king's friends seeing this, forced him to mount his horse and take to flight; but Henry, his valiant son, not heeding what he saw being done by his men, but solely intent on glory and valour, while the rest were taking to flight, most bravely charged the enemy's line, and shook it by the wondrous vigour of his onset. For his troop was the only one mounted on horseback, and consisted of English and Normans, who formed a part of his father's household. His horsemen, however, were not able long to continue their attacks against soldiers on foot, cased in mail, and standing immoveable in close and dense ranks; but, with their lances broken and their horses wounded, were compelled to take to flight.

=== Scots' rout and casualties ===
The battle lasted no longer than between prime and terce, i.e. between daybreak and mid-morning. In Northern England at the end of August sunrise is roughly 6 a.m. and hence the battle lasted no more than 3½ hours; by not long after 9 a.m. all elements of the Scottish army were in retreat or flight. No numbers are given for total English losses but they are said to have been light; of the knights present, only one was killed. Scottish casualties during the battle proper cannot be separated from losses whilst fleeing in the 10 or so hours of daylight remaining. The chroniclers talk variously of the fugitives scattering in all directions, of their attempting to cross the Tees where there was no ford and drowning, of their being found and killed in cornfields and woods, and of fighting between the various contingents. Richard of Hexham says that of the army which came forth from Scotland, more than ten thousand were missing from the re-mustered survivors. Later chroniclers built upon this to claim 10–12,000 Scots killed. John of Worcester gives more details on the fortunes of the Scots knights

But of [David's] army nearly ten thousand fell in different places, and as many as fifty were captured of his picked men. But the king's son came on foot with one knight only to Carlisle, while his father scarce escaped through woods and passes to Roxburgh. Of two hundred mailed knights whom [David] had, only nineteen brought back their hauberks; because each had abandoned as booty to the foe almost everything that he had. And thus very great spoils were taken from his army, as well of horses and arms and raiment as of very many other things.

== Aftermath ==
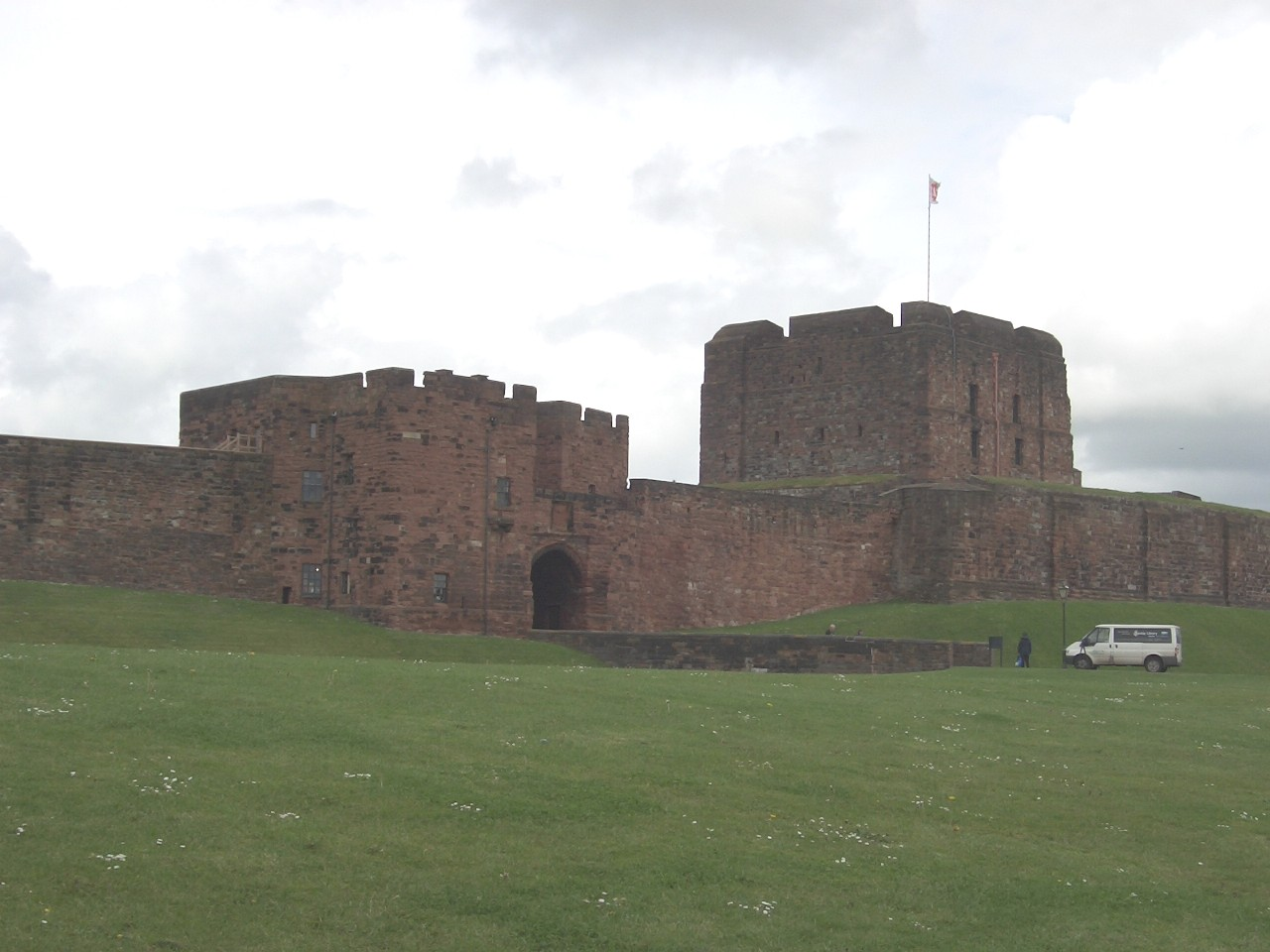
Carlisle Castle was rebuilt by King David, and became one of his chief residences.

=== End of the campaign ===
David regrouped his forces at Carlisle; the nobles of Yorkshire did not move North against him, and their local levies dispersed to their homes rejoicing at the victory. Thus, although militarily the battle was a "shattering defeat", it did not reverse David's previous gains. David had the only army still under arms and was left to consolidate his hold on Cumberland and Northumberland.
On 26 September Cardinal Alberic, bishop of Ostia, arrived at Carlisle where David had called together his kingdom's nobles, abbots and bishops. Alberic was there as a papal legate to resolve a long-running dispute as to whether the bishop of Glasgow was subordinate to the archbishop of York. However, Alberic also addressed more temporal matters: he persuaded David to refrain from further offensive action until Martinmas (11 November) whilst continuing to blockade Wark to starve it into submission, and the 'Picts' to (also by Martinmas) return their captives to Carlisle and free them there.
At Martinmas, the garrison of Wark surrendered on the orders of the castle's owner (Walter Espec), conveyed by the abbot of Rievaulx. The garrison had eaten all but two of their horses; King David rehorsed them and allowed them to depart with their arms.

=== Another peace agreement ===
Negotiations between David and Stephen continued over the winter months, and on 9 April David's son Henry and Stephen's wife Matilda of Boulogne met each other at Durham and agreed a settlement. Henry was given the earldom of Northumberland and was restored to the earldom of Huntingdon and lordship of Doncaster; David himself was allowed to keep Carlisle and Cumberland. However, Stephen was to retain possession of the strategically vital castles of Bamburgh and Newcastle, and Prince Henry was to perform homage for his English lands, while David himself was to promise to "remain loyal" to Stephen at all times. Stephen released those who held fiefs in the lands Henry now held to do homage to Henry, saving only their fealty to Stephen.

=== Northern England under Scottish rule ===
This arrangement lasted for nearly 20 years, and would appear to have been beneficial to both sides. David was able to benefit from the resources of Northern England (for example, the lead mines of the northern Pennines gave him silver from which he was able to strike his own coinage). Northern England did not become involved in the civil war between supporters of Stephen and those of Matilda, although magnates with holdings further south were drawn in. This included David, who despite his promise to Stephen was a loyal supporter of Matilda, but he did not go South with a Scottish army.

The new southern border of David's realm appeared to be permanently secured in 1149, when Matilda's son Henry was knighted by David at Carlisle

he having first given an oath that, if he became king of England, he would give to [David] Newcastle and all Northumbria, and would permit him and his heirs to possess in peace without counter-claim for ever the whole land which lies from the river Tweed to the river Tyne.

=== Status quo restored ===
However, Prince Henry died in 1152, King David in 1153, and King Stephen in 1154. This brought to the throne of Scotland a 14-year-old Malcolm IV of Scotland now facing a young Henry II of England who had at his command the resources not only of an England free from civil war, but also of much of Western France. In 1157, Malcolm travelled to Chester to do homage to Henry who declared that "the king of England ought not to be defrauded of so great a part of his kingdom, nor could he patiently be deprived of it ..."

And [Malcolm] prudently considering that in this matter the king of England was superior to the merits of the case by the authority of might … restored to him the … territories in their entirety, and received from him in return the earldom of Huntingdon, which belonged to him by ancient right. Things being so arranged, England enjoyed for a time her ease and security in all her borders. And the king ruled more widely than all who were known to have ruled in England till that time, that is from the furthest bounds of Scotland as far as to the Pyrenees.

== Significance of the battle ==
The battle did not stop David achieving his declared war aims. We now know that achieving those aims while England was in turmoil did not prevent all David's gains having to be surrendered when Henry II made the Scottish monarch an offer he could not refuse. Unless David had other undeclared aims and ambitions which defeat at the Standard thwarted, therefore, the battle had no long-term significance.

== In historical fiction ==
- In Walter Scott's Ivanhoe (1820), Cedric the Saxon refers to this battle and describes it as "a day of cleaving of shields, when a hundred banners were bent forwards over the heads of the valiant, and blood flowed round like water, and death was held better than flight."
- George Shipway gives a fictional account of the Battle of the Standard in his 1969 novel Knight in Anarchy.
- In his 1983 novel Lord of the Isles, Nigel Tranter places his hero, Somerled, in the vanguard of the Scottish charge.

== See also ==
- Relatio de Standardo
