= Waltheof of Allerdale =

11th- and 12th-century Anglo-Saxon noble, lord of Allerdale in modern Cumbria

Waltheof of Allerdale was an 11th- and 12th-century Anglo-Saxon noble, lord of Allerdale in modern Cumbria. Brother of Dolfin of Carlisle and Gospatric of Dunbar, Waltheof was son of Gospatric, Earl of Northumbria. Both Waltheof and his brother Gospatric witness Earl David's Glasgow Inquest 1113 x 1124, and Waltheof also attests some of David's charters as king of the Scots later. The account of Waltheof and his family in Cumbrian monastic cartularies (St Bees and Wetheral), says that he gave land in Allerdale to his three sisters, Octreda, Gunhilda and Maud.

Waltheof's partner appears to have been a woman named Sigrid or Sigarith. With her he had two sons and several daughters.

- Alan (fl. 1139), succeeded to Allerdale.
- Gopspatric.
- Ethelreda, married Ranulf de Lindesay (de Lindsay) and then William de Esseville.
- Gunhilda, married Uhtred of Galloway.

Waltheof's sister Octreda/Ethelreda married Donnchad mac Maíl Coluim, was briefly Queen Consort of Alba, and the mother of William fitz Duncan, mormaer of Moray. After King Donnchad was killed in November 1094 it is likely that Ethelreda and infant William fled Scotland to Allerdale and the safety of her brother's family. William fitz Duncan appears to have inherited Waltheof's Allerdale territory from his mother.

Waltheof seems to have become abbot of Crowland late in his life, but this Waltheof may be someone else. The abbot of Crowland in question was a monk of Crowland Abbey before becoming abbot in 1125. Abbot Waltheof was deposed by Papal legate Alberic of Ostia at the Council of Westminster.
