= William fitz Duncan =

Scottish prince (1130s–1147)

Mormaer of Moray
- Reign: 1130s–1147
- Predecessor: Óengus
- Born: 1090/1094
- Died: 1147
- Spouse: Unknown woman Alice de Rumilly m. 1137; Unknown Ingen Óengus?
- Issue see also Clan Meic Uilleim: William the Atheling of Egremont; Cicely, Lady of Skipton; Wimund of the Isles? Numerous illegitimate children
- Father: Duncan II, King of Alba
- Mother: Ethelreda

William fitz Duncan (a modern anglicisation of the Old French Guillaume fils de Duncan and the Middle Irish Uilleam mac Donnchada) was a Scottish prince, the son of King Duncan II of Scotland by his wife Ethelreda of Dunbar. He was a territorial magnate in northern Scotland and northern England and a military leader.

In 1094, his father King Duncan II was killed by Mormaer Máel Petair of Mearns, supporting the claims of King Domnall (Donald) III Bán. It is probable that his mother Ethelreda took the infant William and fled Scotland to the safety of Allerdale in Cumberland where her brother Waltheof of Allerdale was lord. William, an only child, grew up there among his cousins. A decade or so later, he ventured to the court of his half-uncle.

Under the reign of his half-uncle Alexander I, it is highly likely that William was regarded as a viable tánaiste (i.e. "designated heir"), but Henry I of England supported David. When David succeeded, William, as the legitimate king under the rules of primogeniture was certainly bought off by David, probably being made tánaiste. William repeatedly leads the lists of witnesses appearing in Scottish royal charters in the reigns of Alexander I and David I.

A 13th century northern English source claims that William was Mormaer of Moray. As this source had no reason to deceive, it is highly likely that William was made the ruler of Moray after the defeat of King Óengus of Moray in 1130. It is feasible, as they coincided closely with each other, that this granting of vast, important territory was in exchange for being passed over by David in the line of succession with the coming of age of David's son, Prince Henry to whom David wanted to secure as his successor, and may also be a factor in his marriage to a daughter of Óengus, whose lands he was receiving. Granting William the Mormaerdom of Moray may have had the dual purpose of compensating a relative for excluding him from succession as well as placing one of David's most loyal and worthy agents over a fragile and recently acquired territory, which he was very keen on keeping. In addition to being the ruler of Moray, William also controlled the English lands of Allerdale, Skipton and Craven, making him one of the greatest barons of northern England.

William was an excellent warrior. His uncle, King David, frequently tasked William with leading his armies in battle. He frequently led Scottish armies. In the campaign of 1138, he led an army of Gaels that defeated a Norman English army at the Battle of Clitheroe, raising the hopes for the success of the royal army, hopes which failed to materialize at the Battle of the Standard. Accordingly, perhaps disappointingly for David for his plans of colonizing and better integrating Moray into his kingdom, William fitz was usually absent from the province because of campaigns, as well as his duties over his other territories.

William had likely two marriages. His first marriage, as now conjectured by scholars, was to a descendant of the deposed king Lulach, possibly Oengus's daughter. This may have been done to strengthen the sovereignty of David's overlordship over a culturally different, subjugated territory, through the continuing of Oengus's dynasty, though supplanted and moderated by David's house. This would be not unlike his motives with the marriage of the Earl of Atholl, Maddad into the Orkney and Caithness dynasty to promote stability and good relations between his and that kingdom, with the objective to reduce threats to his newly acquired Moray province. It has been compellingly supposed and is presumed that Domnall mac Uilleim, and the Meic Uilleim clan that repeatedly rebelled against later Scottish kings in their quest to gain the Scottish throne, must have been descendants of an earlier, legitimate marriage William had to a descendant of Lulach. The continuing support for the Meic Uilleim in Moray, together with their obviously Gaelic background, can best be explained by the assumption that Domnall's mother was a daughter of Óengus of Moray. Such a Moravian origin would explain the strong support the otherwise bastard Meic Uilleims enjoyed in Moray and Ross, as well as the Gaelic stylization of their surname. Domnall mac Uilleim was killed on 31 July 1187 in an uprising against King William the Lion.

In 1137, William married Alice, daughter of William Meschin. By the latter, he had a son, also called William (William of Egremont or William the Atheling), who died in 1160, and three daughters, including Cicely, Lady of Skipton, who married William le Gros, 1st Earl of Albemarle. His marriage brought him the lordship of Copeland, of which his wife was co-heiress. It has historically been presumed that had a large number of bastards, including Wimund of the Isles, who was recorded to be the son of the earl of Moray and for which there is strong circumstantial evidence to support as being William's illegitimate child.

William fitz Duncan died in 1147, whereupon Moray reverted into the hands of David, ostensibly because of Domnall's young age. It may be that David realized the threat posed by the Meic Uilliems for having claims to kingship through both their mother and father's side (great-grandson of Lulach, grandson of Duncan II, respectively), motivating the absolute extermination of their line to remove dynastic rivals.

== Bibliography ==
- Oram, Richard, David I: The King who made Scotland, (Gloucestershire, 2004).
- Oram, Richard, Lordship of Galloway: c.900-1300, (Edinburgh, 2000).
- Dalton, Paul. 2002. Conquest, Anarchy & Lordship: Yorkshire 1066-1154. Cambridge: Cambridge University Press.
- Benedict of Peterborough, Gesta Regis Henrici Secundi ed. W. Stubbs, I (London, 1867), 277–78.
- William of Newburgh, Historia Rerum Anglicarum in R. Howlett (ed.), Chronicles of Stephen etc., I, 7376.

== Notes ==
Preceded by Óengus	Mormaer of Moray; 1130s–1147	Merged to crown see Clan Meic Uilleim
