= List of earls in the reign of Henry III of England =

The following individuals were Earls (suo jure, jure uxoris or jure matris) or Countesses (suo jure) during the reign of Henry III of England who reigned from 1216 to 1272.

The period of tenure as Earl or Countess is given after the name and title of each individual, including any period of minority.

Earl of Arundel
William d'Aubigny, 3rd Earl of Arundel (1193-1221)
William d'Aubigny, 4th Earl of Arundel (1221-1224)
Hugh d'Aubigny, 5th Earl of Arundel (1224-1243)
John FitzAlan, 6th Earl of Arundel jure matris (1243-1267)
John FitzAlan, 7th Earl of Arundel (1267-1272)
Richard FitzAlan, 8th Earl of Arundel (1272-1302)

Earl of Chester (Second Creation)
Ranulf de Blondeville, 6th Earl of Chester (1181-1232)
Matilda of Chester, Countess of Huntingdon, Countess of Chester (1232)
John of Scotland, Earl of Huntingdon, 7th Earl of Chester, (1232-1237)

Earl of Chester (Fourth Creation)
Simon de Montfort, 6th Earl of Leicester, 1st Earl of Chester (1264-1265)

Earl of Cornwall (Fourth Creation)
Richard, 1st Earl of Cornwall (1225-1272)
Edmund, 2nd Earl of Cornwall (1272-1300)

Earl of Derby
William de Ferrers, 4th Earl of Derby (1190-1247)
William de Ferrers, 5th Earl of Derby (1247-1254)
Robert de Ferrers, 6th Earl of Derby (1254-1266)

Earl of Devon
William de Redvers, 5th Earl of Devon (1193-1217)
Baldwin de Redvers, 6th Earl of Devon (1217-1245)
Baldwin de Redvers, 7th Earl of Devon (1245-1262)
Isabella de Forz (nee de Redvers), 8th Countess of Devon suo jure (1262-1293)

Earl of Essex (Second Creation)
Geoffrey FitzGeoffrey de Mandeville, 2nd Earl of Essex (1213-1216)
William FitzGeoffrey de Mandeville, 3rd Earl of Essex (1216-1227)

Earl of Essex (Third Creation)
Humphrey de Bohun, 2nd Earl of Hereford, 1st Earl of Essex (1236-1275)

Earl of Gloucester
Isabella, Countess of Gloucester suo jure (1213-1217)
Geoffrey FitzGeoffrey de Mandeville, 2nd Earl of Essex, Earl of Gloucester jure uxoris (1214-1216)
Amice fitz William, 4th Countess of Gloucester suo jure (1217-1225)
Gilbert de Clare, 4th Earl of Hertford 5th Earl of Gloucester,(1225-1230)
Richard de Clare, 5th Earl of Hertford, 6th Earl of Gloucester (1230-1262)
Gilbert de Clare, 6th Earl of Hertford, 7th Earl of Gloucester (1262-1295)

Earl of Hereford (Sixth Creation)
Henry de Bohun, 1st Earl of Hereford (1199-1220)
Humphrey de Bohun, 2nd Earl of Hereford, 1st Earl of Essex (1220-1275)

Earl of Hertford
Richard de Clare, 3rd Earl of Hertford (1173-1217)
Gilbert de Clare, 4th Earl of Hertford, 5th Earl of Gloucester (1225-1230)
Richard de Clare, 5th Earl of Hertford, 6th Earl of Gloucester (1230-1262)
Gilbert de Clare, 6th Earl of Hertford, 7th Earl of Gloucester(1262-1295)

Earl of Huntingdon
David of Scotland, Earl of Huntingdon (1185-1219)
John of Scotland, Earl of Huntingdon, 7th Earl of Chester (1219-1237)

Earl of Kent (Fourth Creation)
Hubert de Burgh, 1st Earl of Kent (1227-1243)

Earl of Lancaster
Edmund Crouchback, 1st Earl of Lancaster, Earl of Leicester (1267-1296)

Earl of Leicester
Simon de Montfort, 5th Earl of Leicester (1207-1239)
Simon de Montfort, 6th Earl of Leicester (1239-1265)

Earl of Leicester (Second Creation)
Edmund Crouchback, 1st Earl of Lancaster, 1st Earl of Leicester (1265-1296)

Earl of Lincoln (Fourth Creation)
Ranulph de Blondeville, 6th Earl of Chester, 1st Earl of Lincoln (1217-1232)
Hawise of Chester, 1st Countess of Lincoln suo jure (1232)
Margaret de Quincy, Countess of Lincoln suo jure (1232-1266)
John de Lacy, 2nd Earl of Lincoln jure uxoris (1232-1240)
Henry de Lacy, 3rd Earl of Lincoln (1266-1311)

Earl of Norfolk (Second Creation)
Roger Bigod, 2nd Earl of Norfolk (1177-1221)
Hugh Bigod, 3rd Earl of Norfolk (1221-1225)
Roger Bigod, 4th Earl of Norfolk (1225-1270)
Roger Bigod, 5th Earl of Norfolk (1270-1306)

Earl of Oxford (Second Creation)
Robert de Vere, 3rd Earl of Oxford (1214-1221)
Hugh de Vere, 4th Earl of Oxford (1221-1263)
Robert de Vere, 5th Earl of Oxford (1263-1265, 1267-1296)

Earl of Pembroke (Second Creation)
William Marshall, 1st Earl of Pembroke (1199-1219)
William Marshal, 2nd Earl of Pembroke (1219-1231)
Richard Marshal, 3rd Earl of Pembroke (1231-1234)
Gilbert Marshal, 4th Earl of Pembroke (1234-1241)
Walter Marshal, 5th Earl of Pembroke (1241-1245)

Earl of Pembroke (Third Creation)
William de Valence, 1st Earl of Pembroke (1247-1296)

Earl of Richmond
Alix, Duchess of Brittany, Countess of Richmond suo jure (1203-1221)
Peter I, Duke of Brittany, Earl of Richmond jure uxoris (1218)

Earl of Richmond (Second Creation)
Peter I, Duke of Brittany, Earl of Richmond (1218-1235)

Earl of Richmond (Third Creation)

Peter II, Count of Savoy, Earl of Richmond (1240-1268)

Earl of Richmond (Second Creation Restored)
John I, Duke of Brittany, 2nd Earl of Richmond (1268)
John II, Duke of Brittany, 3rd Earl of Richmond (1268-1305)

Earl of Salisbury
Ela of Salisbury, 3rd Countess of Salisbury suo jure (1196-1261)
William Longespée, 3rd Earl of Salisbury jure uxoris (1196-1226)
Margaret Longespée, 4th Countess of Salisbury suo jure (1261-1310)

Earl of Surrey
William de Warenne, 5th Earl of Surrey (1202-1240)
John de Warenne, 6th Earl of Surrey (1240-1304)

Earl of Warwick
Henry de Beaumont, 5th Earl of Warwick (1203-1229)
Thomas de Beaumont, 6th Earl of Warwick (1229-1242)
Margaret de Newburg, 7th Countess of Warwick suo jure (1242-1253)
John Marshal, 7th Earl of Warwick jure uxoris (1242)
John du Plessis, 7th Earl of Warwick jure uxoris (1247-1253)
William Maudit, 8th Earl of Warwick (1253-1267)
William Beauchamp, 9th Earl of Warwick (1268-1298)

Earl of Winchester
Saer de Quincy, 1st Earl of Winchester (1207-1219)
Margaret de Beaumont, Countess of Winchester (1219-1235)
Roger de Quincy, 2nd Earl of Winchester (1235-1264)

== Sources ==
- Ellis, Geoffrey (1963). Earldoms in fee: a study in peerage law and history. Saint Catherine Press.
- Morris, Marc (2015). The Bigod Earls of Norfolk in the Thirteenth Century. Boydell & Brewer Limited. ISBN 9781783270095.
