= Honour of Pontefract =

English feudal barony

The honour of Pontefract, also known as the feudal barony of Pontefract, was an English feudal barony. Its origins lie in the grant of a large, compact set of landholdings in Yorkshire, made between the Norman conquest of England in 1066 and the completion of the Domesday Survey in 1086. An expansive set of landholdings spanning sixty parishes and six wapentakes in Yorkshire, the honour was created primarily to serve a strategic, defensive function in a potentially hostile frontier zone. The first lord was Ilbert de Lacy, who built a castle at Pontefract which became the caput of the honour. Alongside the Yorkshire holdings, a smaller number of dispersed possessions elsewhere in England belonged to the honour.

After Lacy's death, his son succeeded him as lord before having the honour confiscated some time before c. 1116, after which it was regranted twice. Ilbert de Lacy's grandson recovered a two-thirds share in c. 1135, which passed through his heirs, then to a collateral branch in 1193; the final third share was reunited with the rest of the honour in 1205. In 1311, the honour was inherited by an heiress, Alice, who married Thomas, 2nd Earl of Lancaster. After the earl's failed rebellion in 1322, the honour was confiscated and entered a period of royal ownership which ended in 1348 with a grant to Thomas's great-nephew, Henry of Grosmont, 4th Earl (later 1st Duke) of Lancaster. His daughter and heiress Blanche brought it through marriage to John of Gaunt, who was also created Duke of Lancaster. After Gaunt died in 1399, his son and heir Henry of Bolingbroke was denied access to his Lancastrian inheritance (including the honour of Pontefract) by Richard II; Henry seized the throne (as Henry IV) and retook the lands which had belonged to his father, after which the honour formed part of the Duchy of Lancaster, which has ever since been private property of the English monarch.

== History ==
=== Origins ===
Ilbert de Lacy was a Norman landowner of obscure origins. (Note: He held two knight's fees in Lassy and Campeaux from Odo, Bishop of Bayeux.) After the Norman conquest of England, which commenced in 1066, William the Conqueror gave Lacy a large fief in the English county of Yorkshire, which formed the basis of the honour. The exact date of the honour's foundation is unclear; the historian W. E. Wightman suggested that it was soon before 1086, but more recent studies (including those by the historian Sarah Rose) support the thesis that the first grants to Lacy may have taken place in the 1070s and were supplemented thereafter, finally with the royal manor of Tanshelf, which may have been granted shortly before the Domesday Survey (1086). The honour was established by the time of Domesday's completion, and by then substantial in size: it took up 141 entries in the survey's returns. In the historian David Carpenter's words, the fief "formed a compact block stretching from Elland and Golcar ... to Brayton ..., from Grimston Grange and Thorner ... to Hunshelf Hall ... surrounding the [royal manor of] Wakefield". The honour, which spanned approximately sixty parishes, six wapentakes and over 500 square miles, was deliberately created as a territorially compact unit: it was created primarily to serve a strategic function as a defensive bulwark in an important border zone. (Note: The honour did also include a number of scattered holdings in other counties, principally Lincolnshire, Nottinghamshire, Buckinghamshire, Oxfordshire and Surrey.) Lacy established a castle at Pontefract (in the former royal manor of Tanshelf), which became the caput of this honour. (Note: William II granted Ilbert de Lacy the custom of castlery (very probably in respect of Pontefract) as he had held it during the reign of William I and during the time of Odo, bishop of Bayeux. This grant took place between 1087 and 1100, most likely in 1088; it implies that Odo previously had an interest in at least part of Ilbert's Yorkshire fief, though it is not clear whether it was during one or both of Odo's periods of royal favour (1066–83 or 1087–88). Carpenter argues that it was likely during the latter period and that Odo may have been appointed tenant-in-chief of the Yorkshire fief, with Ilbert being restored as tenant-in-chief after Odo's rebellion in 1088.) He died during the reign of King William II, and his son and heir, Robert de Lacy, succeeded to the honour.

=== c. 1115–c. 1135: Forfeiture ===
Robert de Lacy was banished from England some time between 1109 and 1115 or 1116. His English estates were confiscated by the king and the honour of Pontefract was granted to Hugh de Laval, who the historian Janet Burton describes as "a Norman baron of secondary status". After Laval died c. 1129, the honour of Pontefract's sixty knight's fees were divided into three equal portions. William Maltravers paid £1,000 for the reversion of Laval's estate for the term of 15 years, as well as £100 to marry Laval's widow and take possession of her marriage portion and dower. Laval's widow brought two thirds of the honour to Maltravers, while the remaining third (consisting of 20 knight's fees) was inherited by Laval's son, Guy de Laval.

=== c. 1135–1311: Return to the Lacy family ===
Maltravers was killed in 1135 shortly after the accession of King Stephen; afterwards, Robert de Lacy's son Ilbert II de Lacy was granted Maltravers' share of the honour of Pontefract and received a royal pardon for his men's role in Maltravers' death. Guy de Laval and his successors retained the other part of the honour, which consisted mostly of the honour's outlying lands in Lincolnshire and Oxfordshire. Ilbert II disappears from the historical record around 1141; his brother Henry de Lacy succeeded him in the honour of Pontefract. Gilbert de Gant, Earl of Lincoln, disputed Henry de Lacy's right to the honour (possibly because Gant's sister was Ilbert de Lacy's widow). The dispute was resolved through armed conflict, with Lacy retaining possession of the honour and Gant paying compensation to Prior of Pontefract for leaving the priory in ruins. (Note: Some 19th-century scholars, including Richard Holmes, state that William de Roumare, Earl of Lincoln, was given the honour of Pontefract some time after Ilbert de Lacy's death; Holmes states that Roumare's daughter married Gilbert de Gant, Earl of Lincoln, who succeeded to the Pontefract estate in right of her, but Henry de Lacy successfully disputed this inheritance. However, according to the historians J. Horace Round and Oswald Barron, this "statement must be entirely discredited".) After Henry II succeeded to the throne in 1154, he confirmed Lacy's possession and pardoned the family for supporting Stephen during The Anarchy. Lacy died in 1177.

Henry de Lacy's heir was his son Robert de Lacy, who died childless in 1193. Robert bequeathed his lands to his cousin Aubrey de Lisours. (Note: She was the daughter of Aubrey de Lacy, herself the daughter of Robert de Lacy, Ilbert de Lacy I's son.) In 1194, she settled the honour of Pontefract on her grandson, Roger, who took the surname de Lacy. (Note: Aubrey's son and Roger's father John fitz Richard had died in 1190.) Five years later, Roger offered 500 marks to take possession of the Laval share of the honour of Pontefract, which was held by another Guy de Laval, though he did not recover possession immediately. In 1205, after Guy had taken up arms against him, King John granted the Laval share to Roger de Lacy, thus reuniting the whole of the honour. Lacy died in 1211 and his son John received livery of the inheritance two years later. He became Earl of Lincoln in 1232 and died in 1240. His heir was his son Edmund, who was a minor; during his minority, his lands were placed under the guardianship of his mother, Margaret de Quincy, who remarried to Walter Marshal, 5th Earl of Pembroke. Edmund took possession of his inheritance, including the honour of Pontefract, in 1248. He died ten years later, leaving a son, Henry, as his heir. Henry was also a minor and his mother Alicia was awarded the guardianship of his lands. He came of age in 1272.

=== 1311–1399: Lancastrian and royal ownership ===
After both of his sons had died, Henry de Lacy resigned the honour of Pontefract to the king in 1292. The king regranted them to him and the heirs of his body with remainder to the king's brother Edmund, 1st Earl of Lancaster, and the heirs of his body; this effectively gave Lacy a life interest in the honour. In 1294, he regranted a life interest in the honour to himself, but this time with remainder to Edmund's son, Thomas, 2nd Earl of Lancaster, who had married Lacy's daughter and heiress, Alice. Hence, after Henry de Lacy died in 1311, the honour passed to Alice and Thomas; he held it in right of her until his execution in 1322. The honour was then confiscated by Edward II. His successor Edward III granted it to his mother, queen Isabella, for her life in 1327. However, she surrendered it to Edward III's queen Philippa in 1330. Successive Earls of Lancaster leased the honour from her from c. 1340 until 1348, when Edward III regained it and granted it to the 4th Earl, Henry of Grosmont, who was created Duke of Lancaster. After the duke died without a son in 1361, his lands were divided between his two daughters; the honour of Pontefract was given by the king to his daughter-in-law Blanche, the wife of John of Gaunt, one of the king's younger sons who was created Duke of Lancaster in 1363. (Note: After Blanche's only sister Maud died in 1360, Blanche inherited the entire Lancastrian inheritance, which Gaunt held in right of her.) Gaunt died in February 1399; his son Henry of Bolingbroke was denied succession to his lands by Richard II, who granted their custody to Edward, 2nd Duke of York; but later in 1399 Henry seized the throne and took back his father's lands, stipulating that the Duchy of Lancaster thereafter be private property of the monarch. This included the honour of Pontefract, which was thereafter held by the king.
