= Earl of Lincoln =

Title in the Peerage of England

Earldom of Lincoln
- Creation date: 1141 (first creation) after 1143 (second creation) c. 1149 (third creation); 1217 (fourth creation); 1349 (fifth creation); 1467 (sixth creation); 1525 (seventh creation); 1572 (eighth creation)
- Created by: Stephen (first, second, third creations); Henry III (fourth creation); Edward III(fifth creation); Edward IV (sixth creation); Henry VIII (seventh creation); Elizabeth I (eighth creation)
- Peerage: Peerage of England
- First holder: William d'Aubigny, 1st Earl of Arundel and Lincoln
- Present holder: Robert Edward Fiennes-Clinton, 19th Earl of Lincoln
- Heir presumptive: The Hon. William Howson (brother)
- Remainder to: Heirs male of the body, lawfully begotten
- Extinction date: c. 1143 (first creation) c. 1150 (second creation); 1156 (third creation); 1348 (fourth creation); 1361 (fifth creation); 1487 (sixth creation); 1534 (seventh creation)
- Former seats: Clumber Park, Notts. Boyton Manor, Wilts.
- Motto: Loyaulté n'a honte ("There is no shame in loyalty")

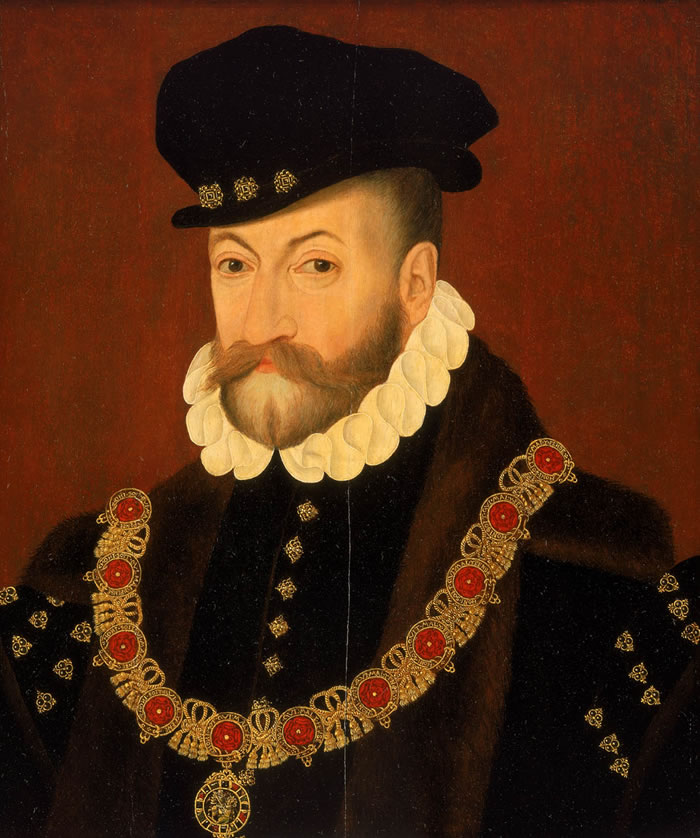
Edward Clinton (1512–1585), 1st Earl of Lincoln (eighth creation of the title)

Earl of Lincoln is a title that has been created eight times in the peerage of England, most recently in 1572. The earldom was held as a subsidiary title by the Dukes of Newcastle-under-Lyne, from 1768 to 1988, until the dukedom became extinct.

== Earls of Lincoln, first creation (1141) ==
- William d'Aubigny, 1st Earl of Lincoln and 1st Earl of Arundel (c. 1109–1176)

The Earldom was created for the first time probably around 1141 as William d'Aubigny, 1st Earl of Arundel, is mentioned as Earl of Lincoln in 1143 in two charters for the Abbey of Affligem, representing his wife Adeliza of Louvain, former wife of King Henry I.

== Earls of Lincoln, second creation (after 1143) ==
- William de Roumare, Earl of Lincoln (1096–1155) (reverted to the Crown)

The Earldom was created for the second time by King Stephen sometime after 1143 for William de Roumare. However, in 1149 or 1150, as William had gone over to the side of Empress Matilda, King Stephen took the earldom from him and elevated Gilbert de Gant as Earl of Lincoln.

== Earls of Lincoln, third creation (about 1149) ==
- Gilbert de Gant, Earl of Lincoln (1120–1156) (reverted to the Crown)

The Earldom was created for the third time by King Stephen in 1149 or 1150 for Gilbert de Gant, but on his death in 1156 it reverted to the Crown.

== Earls of Lincoln, fourth creation (1217) ==
The Earldom was created for the fourth time in 1217 during the reign of Henry III (1207–1272) for Ranulph de Blondeville. He had no issue. In April 1231, with the consent of the King, before his death, he passed the Earldom to his sister Hawise of Chester, and she was formally invested by King Henry III in October 1232. Royal consent was needed for this because the Earldom would otherwise have reverted to the Crown in the absence of a legitimate male heir. She in turn passed the Earldom, again with the consent of the King, jointly to her daughter Margaret de Quincy (d. 1266), who thereby became suo jure 2nd Countess of Lincoln, and to the latter's husband (Hawise's son-in-law) John de Lacy (c. 1192–1240) 8th Baron of Halton, 8th Hereditary Constable of Chester and Baron of Pontefract. They were formally invested by Henry III in November 1232. There is doubt as to whether their son Edmund de Lacy (1230–1258) became Earl of Lincoln, as he predeceased his mother, but not his father: The Complete Peerage describes him as the 3rd Earl, noting that "he does not appear to have been formally invested with the earldom, presumably because his mother outlived him". Edmund's son Henry de Lacy, 4th Earl of Lincoln, married Margaret Longespée. Their daughter Alice de Lacy succeeded as 5th Countess and married Thomas, 2nd Earl of Lancaster. She had no children, and thus, on Alice's death in 1348 the earldom became extinct.

- 1217–1231 Ranulf de Blondeville, 1st Earl of Lincoln (1172–1232)
- 1231–1232 Hawise of Chester, suo jure 1st Countess of Lincoln (1180–c. 1242) (received as inter vivos gift April 1231)
- 1232–1266 Margaret de Quincy, suo jure 2nd Countess of Lincoln (c. 1206–1266) (received 23 Nov 1232 as inter vivos gift from her mother Hawise of Chester)
  - 1232–1240 John de Lacy, 2nd Earl of Lincoln (1192–1240) (held jointly with his wife)
- Edmund de Lacy, Baron of Pontefract (1230–1258), son, never "formally invested with the earldom, presumably because his mother outlived him"
- 1272–1311 Henry de Lacy, 4th Earl of Lincoln (1251–1311), son, during whose wardship the earldom was administered by his mother Alice of Saluzzo from 1266 to 1272
- 1311–1348 Alice de Lacy, suo jure 5th Countess of Lincoln (1281–1348), on whose death without issue the title became extinct.

The above list does not contain the men who became Earl of Lincoln by right of their wives who were Countess of Lincoln suo jure, except for John de Lacy, 2nd Earl of Lincoln. He is included in the above list because he was created Earl of Lincoln by Royal Charter (together with his wife Margaret de Quincy, Countess of Lincoln). The other men who became Earl of Lincoln by right of their wives were:

- Walter Marshal, 5th Earl of Pembroke, married Margaret de Quincy in January 1242, died November 1245
- Thomas of Lancaster, husband of Alice de Lacy, became Earl of Lincoln on the death of his father-in-law in February 1311, died March 1322
- Sir Eubulus le Strange, married Alice de Lacy before November 1324, died September 1335
- Hugh de Freyne, married Alice de Lacy before March 1336, died c. January 1337

As Earl of Lincoln, these husbands had immense power, with the right to control the estates of their wives.

The above list also does not include Margaret Longespée, who was Countess of Salisbury in her own right, but Countess of Lincoln only by right of her husband Henry de Lacy, 3rd Earl of Lincoln.

== Earls of Lincoln, fifth creation (1349) ==
- Henry of Grosmont (c. 1310–1361), Earl of Lincoln (1349–1361)

Arms of Henry Grosmont, Duke of Lancaster and Earl of Lincoln, the royal arms of King Henry III a label of France of three points. These were inherited from his grandfather, Edmund Crouchback, second son of Henry III.

The Earldom was created for the fifth time in the following year, 1349, when it was revived for Alice's nephew-in-law Henry of Grosmont, who was later advanced as Duke of Lancaster. It became extinct on his death in 1361.

== Earls of Lincoln, sixth creation (1467) ==
- John de la Pole, Earl of Lincoln (1462–1487)

Arms of John de La Pole, Earl of Lincoln (sixth creation). The label argent (white) differences his arms from those of his father, the Duke of Suffolk.

The Earldom was created for the sixth time in 1467 for John de la Pole. He was the eldest son of John de la Pole, 2nd Duke of Suffolk, and Elizabeth of York. He predeceased his father, and the title became extinct on his death in 1487.

== Earls of Lincoln, seventh creation (1525) ==
- Henry Brandon, Earl of Lincoln (1523–1534)

The Earldom was created for the seventh time in 1525 for Lord Henry Brandon. He was the second son of Charles Brandon, 1st Duke of Suffolk, by his wife Mary Tudor. He died at the age of eleven in 1534 when the title became extinct.

== Earls of Lincoln, eighth creation (1572) ==
This creation of the Earldom was made for the eighth time in 1572 for the naval commander Edward Clinton, 9th Baron Clinton (see Baron Clinton for earlier history of the family). He served as Lord High Admiral under Edward VI, Mary I, and Elizabeth I. He was succeeded by his son, the second Earl. He represented Launceston and Lancashire in the House of Commons. His son, the third Earl, sat as Member of Parliament for Great Grimsby and Lincolnshire. In 1610, he was summoned to the House of Lords through a writ of acceleration in his father's junior title of Baron Clinton.

His great-grandson, the fifth Earl, died without surviving issue in 1692 thus the earldom and barony became separated. The barony fell into abeyance between his aunts (see Baron Clinton for further history of this title). He was succeeded in the earldom by his second cousin once removed, the sixth Earl. He was the grandson of Sir Edward Clinton, the second son of the second Earl. His son, the seventh Earl, served as Paymaster of the Forces, as Constable of the Tower and as Cofferer of the Household. Lord Lincoln married Lucy Sydney (died 1736), daughter of Robert Sydney, 2nd Earl of Leicester (see the Earl of Chichester for earlier history of the Pelham family).

His eldest son, the eighth Earl, died as a child and was succeeded by his younger brother, the ninth Earl. He was Cofferer of the Household and Lord Lieutenant of Nottinghamshire and Cambridgeshire. He married his first cousin Catherine Pelham (died 1760), daughter and heiress of the Rt Hon. Henry Pelham. In 1756, his uncle the Duke of Newcastle upon Tyne was created Duke of Newcastle-under-Lyne, with remainder to his nephew Lord Lincoln, and on the Duke's death in 1768 Lincoln succeeded as second Duke of Newcastle-under-Lyne according to the special remainder. He assumed by Royal Licence the additional surname of Pelham the same year.

The Duke's two elder sons, George Pelham-Clinton styled Lord Clinton, and Henry Pelham-Clinton, styled Earl of Lincoln, both predeceased him. He was therefore succeeded by his third son, the third Duke, who was a Major-General in the Army. On his early death, the titles passed to his son, the fourth Duke. He served as Lord Lieutenant of Nottinghamshire from 1809 to 1839. He was succeeded by his son, the fifth Duke, a prominent politician who held office as Chief Secretary for Ireland, as Secretary of State for the Colonies and as Secretary of State for War. His eldest son, the sixth Duke, briefly represented Newark in the House of Commons; he married Henrietta Adele, the wealthy heiress and daughter of Henry Thomas Hope MP.

He was succeeded by his eldest son, the seventh Duke, who died childless and was succeeded by his younger brother. In 1881, the eighth Duke assumed by Royal Licence the additional surname of Hope on inheriting the substantial Hope estates through his paternal grandmother. On his death, the titles passed to his only son, the ninth Duke. He had two daughters but no sons, and was succeeded by his third cousin, the tenth Duke. He was the great-grandson of Lord Charles Pelham-Clinton, second son of the fourth Duke. He died unmarried in December 1988, having held the titles for only a month. On his death the dukedom became extinct, while he was succeeded in the earldom by his distant relative, the eighteenth Earl, a descendant in the tenth generation (via Clinton Fiennes-Clinton MP) of the Hon. Sir Henry Fynes-Clinton, third son of the second Earl. Lord Lincoln lived all his life in Australia, and reportedly learned of his succession from a British newspaper. He wrote a book: Memoirs of an Embryo Earl. As of 2025 the title is held by his grandson, the nineteenth Earl, whose father had died in 1999. A Fellow of the Zoological Society of London, the present earl lives in Western Australia.

Numerous members of the Clinton family have also gained distinction. Edward, Lord Clinton, son of the fourth Earl, was Member of Parliament for Callington. Admiral the Hon. George Clinton, youngest son of the sixth Earl, was a naval commander, politician and colonial administrator. His son General Sir Henry Clinton was Commander-in-Chief of British North America from 1778 to 1782. His sons General Sir William Henry Clinton and Lieutenant-General Sir Henry Clinton were also successful military commanders. Lord Edward Pelham-Clinton GCVO, second son of the fifth Duke, was a soldier and courtier.

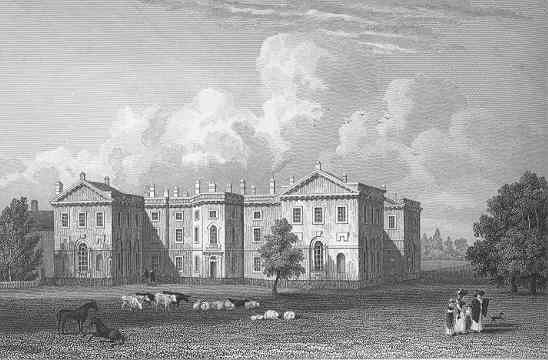
Clumber Park, Nottinghamshire in 1829

The seat of the Dukes of Newcastle was Clumber House near Worksop, Nottinghamshire. However, the house was demolished in 1938. The surrounding estate was sold to the National Trust in 1946 and is now a country park featuring a walled kitchen garden, open to the public.

An extensive collection of papers of the Pelham-Clinton family, Dukes of Newcastle, is deposited at the Department of Manuscripts and Special Collections at the University of Nottingham.

- Edward Clinton, 1st Earl of Lincoln (1512–1585)
- Henry Clinton, 2nd Earl of Lincoln (1539–1616)
- Thomas Clinton, 3rd Earl of Lincoln (1568–1619)
- Theophilus Clinton, 4th Earl of Lincoln (1600–1667)
- Edward Clinton, 5th Earl of Lincoln (1645–1692)
- Francis Clinton, 6th Earl of Lincoln (1635–1693)
- Henry Clinton, 7th Earl of Lincoln (1684–1728)
- George Clinton, 8th Earl of Lincoln (1718–1730)
- Henry Fiennes Pelham-Clinton, 2nd Duke of Newcastle-under-Lyne, 9th Earl of Lincoln (1720–1794), succeeded as 2nd Duke of Newcastle-under-Lyne in 1768
- Thomas Pelham-Clinton, 3rd Duke of Newcastle, 10th Earl of Lincoln (1752–1795)
- Henry Pelham Fiennes Pelham-Clinton, 4th Duke of Newcastle, 11th Earl of Lincoln (1785–1851)
- Henry Pelham Pelham-Clinton, 5th Duke of Newcastle, 12th Earl of Lincoln (1811–1864)
- Henry Pelham Alexander Pelham-Clinton, 6th Duke of Newcastle, 13th Earl of Lincoln (1834–1879)
- Henry Pelham Archibald Douglas Pelham-Clinton, 7th Duke of Newcastle, 14th Earl of Lincoln (1864–1928)
- Henry Francis Hope Pelham-Clinton-Hope, 8th Duke of Newcastle, 15th Earl of Lincoln (1866–1941)
- Henry Edward Hugh Pelham-Clinton-Hope, 9th Duke of Newcastle, 16th Earl of Lincoln (1907–1988)
- Edward Charles Pelham-Clinton, 10th Duke of Newcastle, 17th Earl of Lincoln (1920–1988), unmarried, the dukedom became extinct; however the earldom of Lincoln devolved upon his tenth cousin in Australia
- Edward Horace Fiennes-Clinton, 18th Earl of Lincoln (1913–2001), succeeded his tenth cousin as 18th Earl
- Robert Edward Fiennes-Clinton, 19th Earl of Lincoln (born 19 June 1972)

== Present peer ==
Assumed arms of Fynes-Clinton, quartering 1. & 4. Clinton with 2. & 3. Fiennes

The elder son of Edward Gordon Fiennes-Clinton (1943–1999), later styled Lord Fynes, and his wife Julia Eleanor Howson, Robert Edward Fiennes-Clinton (born 19 June 1972) succeeded his grandfather in the family title (cr. 1572) on 7 July 2001, becoming the 19th Earl of Lincoln. His mother, the eldest daughter of William Thomas Howson JP and a great-great-niece of the artist Joan Howson, and father separated on 28 August 1989.

Educated at Pinjarra High School, Lord Lincoln was elected a Fellow of the Zoological Society of London in 2013 and is an honorary member of the WACA. Resident at Warnbro in 2003, he now lives at Parmelia, Western Australia.

The heir presumptive to the title is Lord Lincoln's younger brother the Hon. William Roy Fiennes-Clinton (born 1980), who in 1996 assumed in lieu the name of William James Howson by WA Government Licence.

== Family tree ==
Family Tree of the Dukes of Newcastle, Earls of Lincoln (8th creation) and Earls of Clare

Baron Clinton (8th creation), 1298
John Clinton d. 1315; 1st Baron Clinton
Baron de Clynton, cr. 1330
John Clinton d. c. 1335; 2nd Baron Clinton	William de Clinton c. 1304 – 1354; Earl of Huntingdon, Baron de Clynton
Barony de Clynton extinct, 1354
John Clinton d. 1398; 3rd Baron Clinton
William Clinton dvp. 1383
William Clinton; 1378–1431; 4th Baron Clinton
Baron Ogle, 1461
John Clinton; 1410–1464; 5th Baron Clinton; Attainted, 1459; restored, 1461	Robert Ogle; 1406–1469; 1st Baron Ogle
John Clinton c. 1429 – 1488; 6th Baron Clinton	Owen (Ewyn) Ogle; 1440–1486; 2nd Baron Ogle
John Clinton c. 1470 – 1514; 7th Baron Clinton	Ralph Ogle; 1468–1513; 3rd Baron Ogle
Thomas Clinton; 1490–1517; 8th Baron Clinton	Robert Ogle; 1490–1530; 4th Baron Ogle
Earl of Lincoln (8th creation), 1572
Edward Clinton; 1512–1585; 1st Earl of Lincoln, 9th Baron Clinton	Robert Ogle; 1513/1527 – 1545; 5th Baron Ogle
Henry Clinton; 1539–1616; 2nd Earl of Lincoln, 10th Baron Clinton	Robert Ogle; 1529–1562; 6th Baron Ogle	Cuthbert Ogle c. 1540 – 1597; 7th Baron Ogle	William Cavendish c. 1505 – 1557	Bess of Hardwick c. 1527 – 1608
Earldom of Ogle abeyant, 1597
Earl of Ogle abeyance ended, 1628
Thomas Clinton; 1568–1619; 3rd Earl of Lincoln, 11th Baron Clinton	Edward Clinton; 1572–1623	Catherine Ogle; 1568/69/1570–1629; 8th Baroness Ogle	Charles Cavendish; 1553–1617	Frances Cavendish; 1548–1632	Henry Pierrepont; 1546–1615	see Earls & Dukes of Devonshire
Viscount Mansfield, 1620; Earl of Newcastle upon Tyne, 1628; Marquess of Newcastle-upon-Tyne, 1643; Duke of Newcastle-Upon-Tyne (1st creation) and Earl of Ogle, 1665	Earl of Clare (1st creation, 1624)
Henry Clinton later Fynes; 1587–1641	William Cavendish; 1592–1676; 1st Duke (and Marquess and Earl) of Newcastle-upon-Tyne and Viscount Mansfield, 9th Baron Ogle	Robert Pierrepont; 1584–1643; 1st Earl of Kingston-upon-Hull	John Holles; 1564–1637; 1st Earl of Clare
Baron Holles of Ifield in the County of Sussex
Theophilus Clinton; 1600–1667; 4th Earl of Lincoln, 12th Baron Clinton	Francis Clinton; 1610–1681	William Pierrepont c. 1607 – 1678	John Holles; 1595–1666; 2nd Earl of Clare	Denzil Holles; 1599–1680; 1st Baron Holles
Baronet of Winterbourne in the County of Dorset, 1660
Edward Clinton; 1624–1657	Francis Clinton; 1635–1693; 6th Earl of Lincoln	Norreys Fynes; 1617–1693	Henry Cavendish; 1630–1691; 2nd Duke (and Marquess and Earl) of Newcastle-upon-Tyne and Viscount Mansfield, 9th Baron Ogle	Frances Pierrepont; 1630–1695	Grace Pierrepont; 1633–1702	Gilbert Holles; 1633–1689; 3rd Earl of Clare	Francis Holles; 1627–1690; 2nd Baron Holles, 1st Baronet
Barony Ogle abeyant and all other titles extinct, 1691
Duke of Newcastle-Upon-Tyne (2nd creation) and Marquess of Clare (1st creation), 1694	Baron Pelham of Laughton, 1706; Baron Pelham of Stanmer, 1762
Edward Clinton; 1645–1692; 5th Earl of Lincoln, 13th Baron Clinton	Norreys Fynes; 1651–1736	Margaret Cavendish; 1661–1716	John Holles; 1662–1711; Duke of Newcastle-upon-Tyne and Marquess of Clare, 4th Earl of Clare	Grace Holles c. 1668 – 1700	Thomas Pelham; 1653–1712; Baron Pelham of Laughton and of Stanmer, 4th Pelham baronet, of Laughton	Denzil Holles; 1675–c. 1692; 3rd Baron Holles, 1st Baronet
All titles extinct, 1711	Both titles extinct, c. 1692
Earl of Clare (2nd creation, 1714; Duke of Newcastle-Upon-Tyne (3rd creation) and Marquess of Clare (2nd creation), 1715; Duke of Newcastle-Under-Lyne, 1756
Kendal Fynes; 1692–1740	Henry Clinton; 1684–1728; 7th Earl of Lincoln	Lucy Pelham; 1695–1736	Henry Pelham; 1694–1754	Thomas Pelham-Holles; 1693–1768; Duke of Newcastle-upon-Tyne, 1st Duke of Newcastle-under-Lyne, Marquess of Clare, Earl of Clare
All titles except Dukedom of Newcastle-under-Lyne extinct, 1768
Duke of Newcastle-Under-Lyne, 1756 (succeeded by special remainder, 1768)
Norreys Fynes; 1720–1764	George Clinton; 1718–1730; 8th Earl of Lincoln	Henry Pelham-Clinton; 1720–1794; 2nd Duke of Newcastle-under-Lyne, 9th Earl of Lincoln	Catherine Pelham; 1727–1760
Baron FitzGibbon, of Lower Connello in the County of Limerick (Ire), 1789; Viscount of Clare (Ire), 1793; Earl of Clare (Ire 3rd creation), 1795; Baron FitzGibbon, of Sidbury in the County of Devon (GB), 1799
John FitzGibbon; 1748–1802; 1st Earl of Clare	The FitzGibbon Earls of Clare are seemingly unrelated to the Holles family, the previous Earls of Clare.	Charles Fynes later Fynes Clinton; 1748–1827	Henry Pelham-Clinton; 1750–1778; Earl of Lincoln	Thomas Pelham-Clinton; 1752–1795; 3rd Duke of Newcastle-under-Lyne, 10th Earl of Lincoln
John FitzGibbon; 1792–1851; 2nd Earl of Clare	Richard Hobart FitzGibbon; 1793–1864; 3rd Earl of Clare	Clinton James Fynes Clinton later Fiennes-Clinton; 1792–1833	Henry Pelham-Clinton; 1785–1851; 4th Duke of Newcastle-under-Lyne, 11th Earl of Lincoln
Earldom of Clare extinct, 1864
Henry Fiennes-Clinton; 1826–1911	Henry Pelham-Clinton; 1811–1864; 5th Duke of Newcastle-under-Lyne, 12th Earl of Lincoln	Charles Pelham-Clinton; 1813–1894
Charles Edward Fiennes-Clinton; 1855–1888	Henry Pelham-Clinton; 1834–1879; 6th Duke of Newcastle-under-Lyne, 13th Earl of Lincoln	Charles Pelham-Clinton; 1857–1911
Edward Henry Fiennes-Clinton; 1886–1916	Henry Pelham-Clinton; 1864–1928; 7th Duke of Newcastle-under-Lyne, 14th Earl of Lincoln	Francis Pelham-Clinton-Hope; 1866–1941; 8th Duke of Newcastle-under-Lyne, 15th Earl of Lincoln	Guy Pelham-Clinton; 1894–1934
Edward Horace Fiennes-Clinton; 1913–2001; 18th Earl of Lincoln	Henry Pelham-Clinton-Hope; 1907–1988; 9th Duke of Newcastle-under-Lyne, 16th Earl of Lincoln	Edward Pelham-Clinton; 1920–1988; 10th Duke of Newcastle-under-Lyne, 17th Earl of Lincoln
Dukedom of Newcastle-upon-Tyne extinct, 1988
Edward Gordon Fiennes-Clinton; 1943–1999
Robert Edward Fiennes-Clinton b. 1972; 19th Earl of Lincoln	William James (Fiennes-Clinton) Howson b. 1980
Heir presumptive to his elder brother in the earldom of Lincoln

== See also ==
- Duke of Lancaster
- Duke of Suffolk
- Duke of Newcastle
- Earl of Chichester
- Baron Clinton
- Rt Hon. Henry Pelham
