= Maud de Lacy, Countess of Gloucester =

Countess of Hertford and Gloucester

Maud de Lacy
- Countess of Hertford and Gloucester
- Born: 25 January 1223; Lincoln, Lincolnshire, England
- Died: 1287/10 March 1288/9
- Noble family: de Lacy (by birth) de Clare (by marriage)
- Spouse: Richard de Clare, 5th Earl of Hertford, 6th Earl of Gloucester
- Issue: Isabel de Clare; Gilbert de Clare, 6th Earl of Hertford, 7th Earl of Gloucester; Thomas de Clare, Lord of Thomond; Bovo de Clare, Chancellor of Llandaff; Margaret, Countess of Cornwall; Rohese de Clare; Eglantine de Clare
- Father: John de Lacy, 2nd Earl of Lincoln
- Mother: Margaret de Quincy, 2nd Countess of Lincoln

Maud de Lacy (25 January 1223 – 10 March 1289) was an English noblewoman, being the eldest child of John de Lacy, 2nd Earl of Lincoln, and the wife of Richard de Clare, 5th Earl of Hertford, 6th Earl of Gloucester.

== Life ==
Maud de Lacy had a personality that was described as "highly competitive and somewhat embittered". She became known as one of the most litigious women in the 13th century as she was involved in numerous litigations and lawsuits with her tenants, neighbours, and relatives, including her own son. Author Linda Elizabeth Mitchell, in her Portraits of Medieval Women: Family, Marriage, and Politics in England 1225-1350', states that Maud's life has received "considerable attention by historians".

Maud was styled Countess of Hertford and Countess of Gloucester upon her marriage to Richard de Clare. Although her mother, Lady Margaret de Quincy, was suo jure Countess of Lincoln, this title never passed to Maud as her mother's heir was Henry de Lacy, 3rd Earl of Lincoln, the son of Maud's deceased younger brother Edmund de Lacy, Baron of Pontefract.

Her eldest son was Gilbert de Clare, 6th Earl of Hertford, 7th Earl of Gloucester, a powerful noble during the reigns of kings Henry III of England and Edward I.

== Family ==
Maud de Lacy was born on 25 January 1223 in Lincoln, Lincolnshire, England, the eldest child of John de Lacy, 2nd Earl of Lincoln, a Magna Carta Surety, and Margaret de Quincy, 2nd Countess of Lincoln suo jure.

Her paternal grandparents were Roger de Lacy, Baron of Pontefract and Maud de Clere, and her maternal grandparents were Robert de Quincy and Hawise of Chester, 1st Countess of Lincoln suo jure.

Maud and her mother, Margaret, were never close; in point of fact, relations between the two women were described as strained. Throughout Maud's marriage, the only interactions between Maud and her mother were quarrels regarding finances, pertaining to the substantial Marshal family property Margaret owned and controlled due to the latter's second marriage on 6 January 1242 to Walter Marshal, 5th Earl of Pembroke almost two years after the death of Maud's father, John de Lacy in 1240. Despite their poor rapport with one another, Maud was, nevertheless, strongly influenced by her mother.

The fact that her mother preferred her grandson, Henry over Maud did not help their relationship; Henry, who was also her mother's ward, was made her heir, and he later succeeded to the earldom of Lincoln.

== Marriage to the Earl of Gloucester ==
On 25 January 1238 which was her fifteenth birthday, Maud married Richard de Clare, 5th Earl of Hertford, and 6th Earl of Gloucester, son of Gilbert de Clare, 4th Earl of Hertford, 5th Earl of Gloucester, and Isabel Marshal. Maud was his second wife. Maud's parents paid King Henry III the enormous sum of 5,000 pounds to obtain his agreement to the marriage. The King supplied her dowry which consisted of the castle of Usk, the manor of Clere, as well as other lands and manors.

Throughout her marriage, Maud's position as the wife of the most politically significant nobleman of the 13th century was diminished by her mother's control of a third of the Marshal inheritance and her rank as Countess of Lincoln and dowager countess of Pembroke.

Richard being the heir to one-fifth of the Pembroke earldom was also the guarantor of his mother-in-law's dowry.

In about 1249/50, Maud ostensibly agreed to the transfer of the manor of Naseby in Northamptonshire, which had formed the greatest part of her maritagium [marriage portion], to her husband's young niece Isabella and her husband, William de Forz, 4th Earl of Albemarle as part of Isabella's own maritagium. Years later, after the deaths of both women's husbands, Maud sued Isabella for the property, claiming that it had been transferred against her will. Isabella, however, was able to produce the chirograph that showed Maud's participation in the writing of the document; this according to the Common Law signified Maud's agreement to the transaction, and Maud herself was "amerced for litigating a false claim".

=== Issue ===
Richard and Maud had:

- Isabel de Clare (1240 – before 1271), married as his first wife, William VII, Marquess of Montferrat,
- Gilbert de Clare, 6th Earl of Hertford, 7th Earl of Gloucester (2 September 1243 – 7 December 1295), married firstly Alice de Lusignan of Angouleme; he married secondly Joan of Acre, by whom he had issue.
- Thomas de Clare, Lord of Thomond (1245 – 29 August 1287), married Juliana FitzGerald, daughter of Maurice FitzGerald, 3rd Lord of Offaly and Maud de Prendergast
- Bovo de Clare, Chancellor of Llandaff (21 July 1248 – 1294)
- Margaret de Clare (1250 – 1312/1313), married Edmund, 2nd Earl of Cornwall. Their marriage was childless.
- Rohese de Clare (17 October 1252 – after 1316), married Roger de Mowbray, 1st Baron Mowbray, by whom she had issue.
- Eglantine de Clare (1257 – 1257)

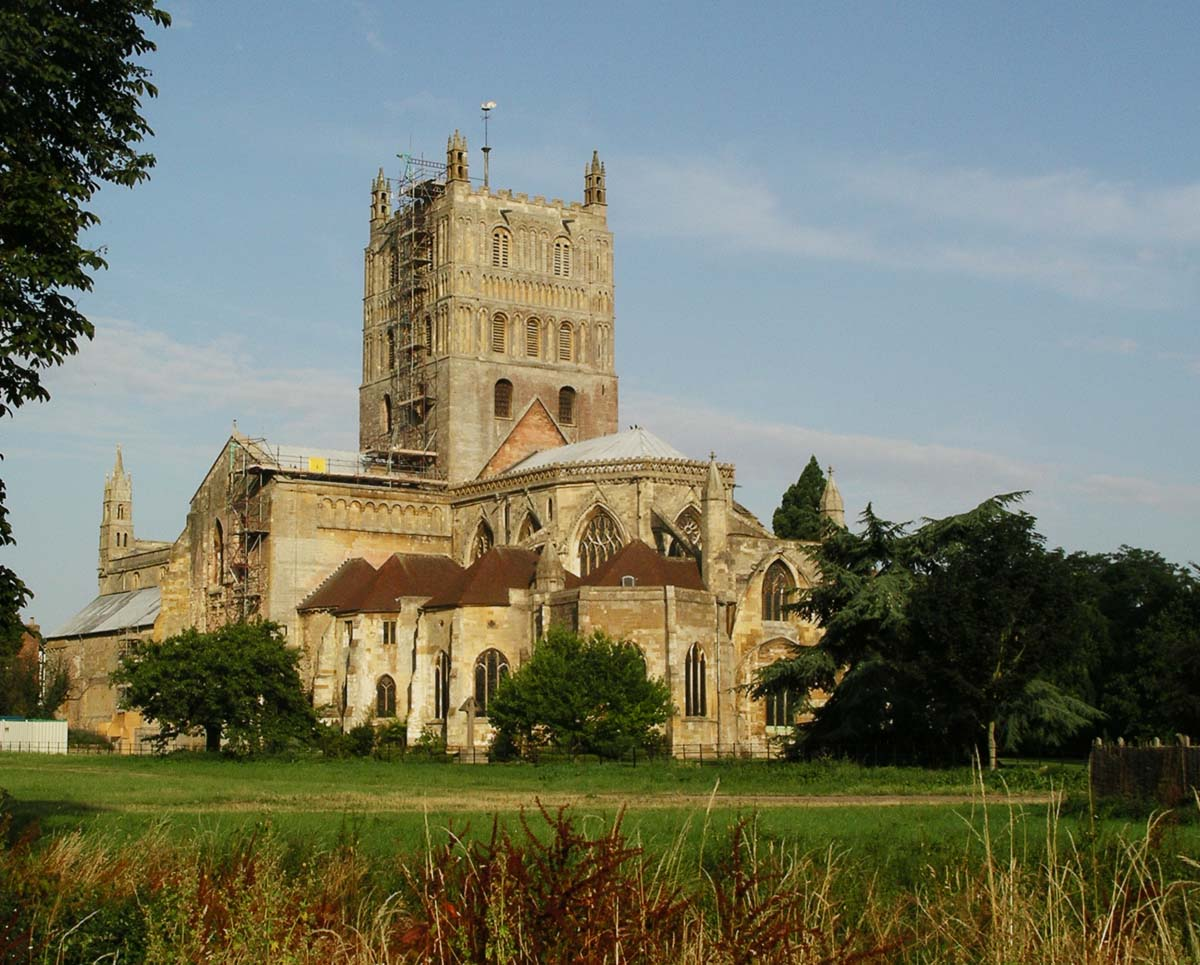
Tewkesbury Abbey, where Maud designed and commissioned a splendid tomb for her husband Richard de Clare, 6th Earl of Gloucester

== Widowhood ==
On 15 July 1262, her husband died near Canterbury. Maud designed and commissioned a magnificent tomb for him at Tewkesbury Abbey where he was buried. She also donated the manor of Sydinghowe to the "Priory of Leigh" (i.e. Canonsleigh Abbey, Devon, for the soul of Richard, formerly her husband, Earl of Gloucester and Hertford by charter dated to 1280. Their eldest son Gilbert succeeded Richard as the 6th Earl of Hertford and 7th Earl of Gloucester. Although Maud carefully arranged the marriages of her daughters, the King owned her sons' marriage rights.

She was involved in numerous lawsuits and litigations with her tenants, neighbours, and relatives, including her eldest son Gilbert, who sued her for admeasurement of her dowry. In her 27 years of widowhood, Maud brought 33 suits into the central courts; and she herself was sued a total of 44 times. As a result, she was known as one of the most litigious women in the 13th century. She endowed many religious houses, including the Benedictine Stoke-by-Clare Priory, Suffolk (re-established in 1124 by Richard de Clare, 1st Earl of Hertford having been moved from Clare Castle) and Canonsleigh Abbey, Devon, which she re-founded as a nunnery. She also vigorously promoted the clerical career of her son, Bovo, and did much to encourage his ambitions and acquisitiveness. She was largely responsible for many of the benefices that were bestowed on him, which made him the richest churchman of the period. Although not an heiress, Maud herself was most likely the wealthiest widow in 13th century England.

Maud died sometime between 1287 and 10 March 1288/9.

== Sources ==
- Altschul, Michael (2019). A Baronial Family in Medieval England: The Clares, 1217-1314. Johns Hopkins University Press.
- Blakely, Ruth Margaret (2005). The Brus Family in England and Scotland, 1100-1295. The Boydell Press.
- Mitchell, Linda Elizabeth (2002). Portraits of Medieval Women: Family, Marriage, and Politics in England 1225-1350. Saint Martin's Press Inc. ISBN 978-0-312-29297-3.
