= Countess of Lincoln =

Countess of Lincoln is a title that may be held by a female in her own right or given to the wife of the Earl of Lincoln. Those who have held the title include:

== Countesses of Lincoln in their own right ==
- Hawise of Chester, 1st Countess of Lincoln (1180–1243)
- Margaret de Quincy, Countess of Lincoln (c.1206-1266)
- Alice de Lacy, 4th Countess of Lincoln (1281–1348)

== Countesses of Lincoln by marriage ==
- Elizabeth FitzGerald, Countess of Lincoln (1527–1590)
- Elizabeth Clinton, Countess of Lincoln (née Knyvet; c.1570-1638)
- Bridget Clinton, Countess of Lincoln (17th century; exact dates unknown)
