= Bogo de Clare =

English ecclesiastic (1248–1294)

Bogo (Note: Perhaps a Latin equivalent to Bevis.) de Clare (21 July 1248 – October 1294) was a member of the Anglo-Norman de Clare family, as third son of Richard de Clare (1222–1262), 5th Earl of Hertford and 6th Earl of Gloucester. He was the brother of Gilbert and Thomas.

== Early life ==
As the earl's third son, he was destined for the Church. (Note: In medieval times the first son inherited via primogeniture, the second son became a soldier, and the third son went into the priesthood.) At the age of eleven, Bogo was appointed Dean of Stafford.

== Career and reputation ==
Through his father's influence, and that of his brother and their friends, and even King Henry III ("who should have known better") he became Chancellor of Llandaff, (Note: Whether of Landaff Cathedral or Diocese of Llandaff is not stated.) Treasurer of York Minster (see also Treasurer's House, York) and the rector of at least 20 clerical livings. (Note: Described in the Flores Historiarum of Matthew Paris as "multarum rector ecclesiarum vel potius incubator", which is cited by King & Perks and interpreted as "incumbent, or rather incumbrance, of an altogether remarkable number of benefices".) Despite a 1283 order from William de Wickwane, Archbishop of York (died 1285), there is no evidence that he was ever ordained priest.

In June 1282 in a highly critical letter, Archbishop Peckham had accused Bogo of being a (raptor) or plunderer of churches rather than a rector. "At that time lord Bogo de Clare had powerfully interfered with the proceeds of the York treasury; to whom the lord archbishop opposed himself with all his strength; at last, I do not know how, the storm completely calmed down."

Some years before his death he became the owner of Tregrug Castle, near the village of Llangybi, in Monmouthshire.

He died suddenly in October 1294 ("before the Feast of All Saints"), his passing noticed by several chroniclers. The Worcester annalist commented that "God only knows if his life was worthy of praise, but no-one thought it worthy of imitation".

== Works cited ==
- Giuseppi, M. S. (1920). "I.—The Wardrobe and Household Accounts of Bogo de Clare, A. D., 1284–6" (PDF). Archaeologia. 70: 1–56. doi:10.1017/S0261340900011024 – via the Internet Archive.
- King, D. J. Cathcart; Perks, J. Clifford (1957). "Llangibby Castle". Archaeologia Cambrensis. 105 (1956): 96–132 – via the National Library of Wales.
- Luard, Henry Richards, ed. (1869) [entry dated 1294]. "Annales prioratus de Wigornia". Annales monastici. Rolls Series (in Latin). Vol. IV. London: Longmans, Green, Reader and Dyer. pp. 353–564 – via the Internet Archive.
- Luard, Henry Richards, ed. (1890) [entry dated 1294]. "Anno gratiæ MCCXCIV". Flores historiarum. Rolls Series (in Latin). Vol. III. London: Printed for H.M.S.O. by Eyre & Spottiswoode. pp. 88–93 – via the Internet Archive.
- Peckham, John (1882) [letter dated 8 June 1282]. "To Bogo de Clare". In Martin, Charles Trice (ed.). Registrum epistolarum fratris Johannis Peckham, archiepiscopi Cantuariensis. Rolls Series (in Latin). Vol. I. London: Longman & Co., Trübner & Co., et al. pp. 371–2 – via the Internet Archive.
- Summerson, Henry (11 June 2020) [2004]. "Clare, Bogo de (1248–1294)". Oxford Dictionary of National Biography (online ed.). Oxford University Press. (Subscription, Wikipedia Library access or UK public library membership required.)
- Wykes, Thomas (1869) [entry dated 1285]. "Annales monasterii de Oseneia et Chronicon vulgo dictum Thomæ Wykes". In Luard, Henry Richards (ed.). Annales monastici. Rolls Series (in Latin). Vol. IV. London: Longmans, Green, Reader and Dyer. pp. 1–352 – via the Internet Archive.
