= Margaret Longespée, 4th Countess of Salisbury =

English noblewoman

Margaret Longespée, 4th Countess of Salisbury (died 1309) was an English noblewoman.

Margaret was the only child of William III Longespée, son of William Longespée the Younger, and Maud de Clifford, granddaughter of the prince of North Wales, Llywelyn ab Iorwerth. After her father was badly wounded at a tournament at Blyth, Nottinghamshire on 4 July 1256, he began negotiations for Margaret's marriage to Henry, the heir by Edmund de Lacy of Pontefract. The marriage was confirmed by King Henry III of England on 23 December 1256.

After Margaret's father died, the king appointed her father-in-law Edmund, as her guardian. When Edmund died suddenly in 1258, the king appointed Margaret de Quincy, Countess of Lincoln and Edmund's widow Alésia of Saluzzo, as guardians.

She was married to Henry in 1257. From her marriage to Henry, Margaret had at least three children:

- Edmund de Lacy (died 1308)
- John de Lacy
- Alice de Lacy (1281–1348)

Both her sons died in accidents and left no heirs, leaving her daughter Alice, who was married to Thomas of Lancaster, as her heir.

== Citations ==
Peerage of England
Preceded by Ela of Salisbury	Countess of Salisbury; 1261—1309 with Henry de Lacy (1261-1309)	Succeeded by Alice de Lacy
