= Henry de Lacy, Earl of Lincoln =

English noble

Henry de Lacy
- Earl of Lincoln; Baron of Pontefract
- Arms of Henry de Lacy: Or, a lion rampant purpure
- Predecessor: Margaret de Quincy, Countess of Lincoln
- Successor: Alice de Lacy, 4th Countess of Lincoln
- Born: 1251
- Died: February 1311 (aged around 54); Lincoln's Inn, London, England
- Buried: St Paul's Cathedral
- Spouses: Margaret Longespée; Joan Fitz Martin
- Issue: Alice de Lacy; Edmund de Lacy; John de Lacy
- Father: Edmund de Lacy, Baron of Pontefract
- Mother: Alésia of Saluzzo

Henry de Lacy, Earl of Lincoln (c. 1251 – February 1311), Baron of Pontefract, Lord of Bowland, Baron of Halton and hereditary Constable of Chester, was an English nobleman and confidant of King Edward I. He served Edward in Wales, France, and Scotland, both as a soldier and a diplomat. Through his mother he was a great-grandson of Amadeus IV, Count of Savoy. He is the addressee, or joint composer, of a poem (a tenson) by Walter of Bibbesworth about crusading, La pleinte par entre missire Henry de Lacy et sire Wauter de Bybelesworthe pur la croiserie en la terre seinte.

== Origins ==
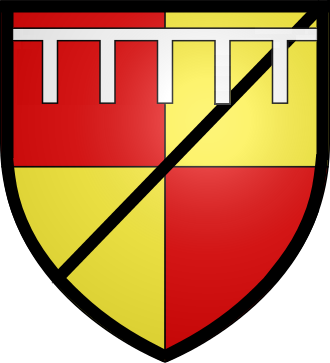
Arms of Henry de Lacy from early in his life, as displayed in Westminster Abbey

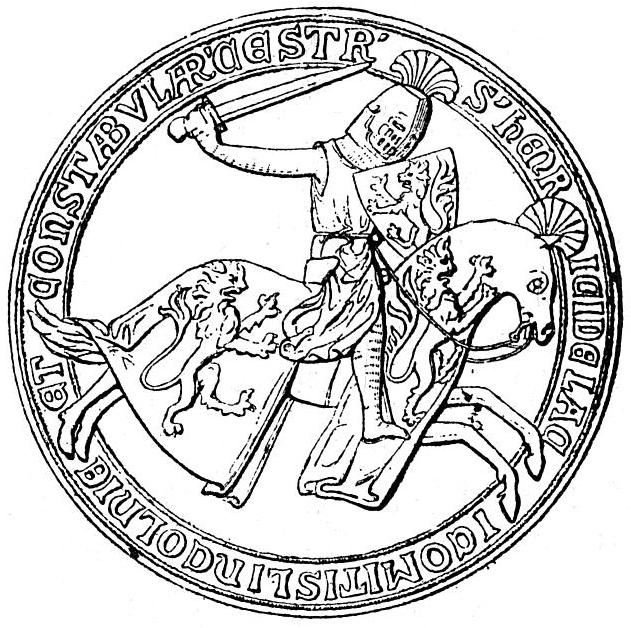
Seal of Henry de Lacy, Earl of Lincoln.

Henry was the son and heir of Edmund de Lacy, Baron of Pontefract (c. 1230–1258) (eldest son and heir apparent of John de Lacy, Earl of Lincoln (c. 1192–1240) and Margaret de Quincy suo jure Countess of Lincoln (c. 1206–1266)) by his wife Alice of Saluzzo, a Savoyard noblewoman descended from Amadeus IV, Count of Savoy, of the Royal House of Savoy. Alice was the daughter of Manfred III of Saluzzo.

== Inheritance ==
Henry's father died in 1258 when he was a young child aged about 7, and he went into wardship, which was re-purchased by his mother, with the help of his grandmother. As his father had predeceased his own mother, suo jure the Countess of Lincoln, Henry became her heir when she died in 1266, when he was aged 15 and still in wardship. As the ward to large and important estates from both his father and more importantly his grandmother, he was educated at the court of King Henry III.

In 1258, he inherited from his father the titles and offices Baron of Pontefract, Baron of Halton and hereditary Constable of Chester and in about 1266 from his paternal grandmother, Margaret de Quincy, he inherited lands and titles including Earl of Lincoln. In 1272, he attained the age of majority (21), was knighted and became the Earl of Lincoln.

== Career ==
He became chief councillor to King Edward I, son and successor of Henry III. While Edward was engaged in military conflicts with the Scots, Henry was appointed Protector of the Realm. Having taken part in the Conquest of Wales in 1282, Henry was granted the Lordship of Denbigh and built Denbigh Castle.

In 1296, he went to France with the king's younger brother Edmund Crouchback as part of the 1294–1303 Gascon War. Upon Edmund's death that year, he succeeded as commander of the English forces in Aquitaine. He commanded the English army that was routed by the French under Robert II of Artois at the battle of Bonnegarde in 1297. He returned to England early in 1298. He was at the Battle of Falkirk in 1298 and at the Siege of Carlaverock Castle in 1300, both in Scotland. The Roll of Carlaverock records his coat of arms in verse as "Or, a lion rampant purpure".

In 1299, he was one of the chief English negotiators at Montreuil and arranged the betrothal of Edward's son Prince Edward of Caernarfon with Philip IV's daughter Princess Isabella. In November 1300, he was sent on a mission to Rome to complain to the Pope about injury done by the Scots. In 1302, he was again appointed to negotiate a peace with France. The 1303 Treaty of Paris returned Aquitaine to Edward.

He was present at King Edward's death in July 1307. For a short time he was friendly with the new king Edward II and with the king's favourite Piers Gaveston, but quickly changed his loyalties and joined Thomas, 2nd Earl of Lancaster, and the baronial party. He was one of the "Ordainers" appointed in 1311 and was Regent of the Kingdom during the king's absence in Scotland in the same year. He transferred Stanlow Abbey, the Cistercian monastery of which his family was patron, to Whalley Abbey.

== Marriage and issue ==
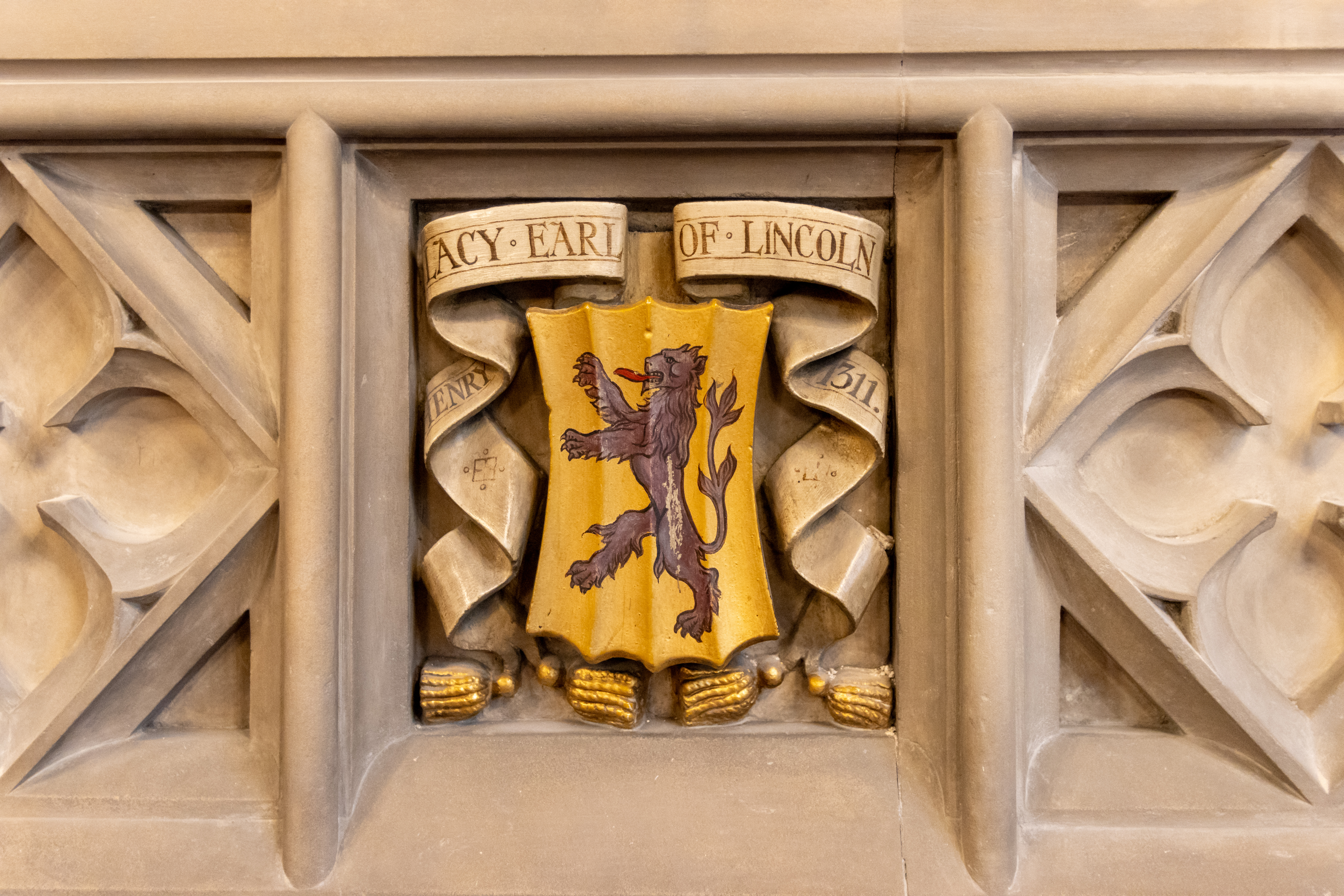
Engraving and coat of arms above a fireplace at Lincoln's Inn, London

He married twice:

- Firstly to Margaret Longespée, daughter of William Longespée III and Maud de Clifford, by whom he had two sons who died young and an only daughter and heiress:
  - Alice de Lacy, 4th Countess of Lincoln (25 December 1281–1348) who married Thomas, 2nd Earl of Lancaster.
  - Edmund de Lacy, drowned in a well at Denbigh Castle.
  - John de Lacy, fell to his death from a parapet at Pontefract Castle.
- Secondly, he married Joan FitzMartin (died 1322), daughter of William Martin, 1st Baron Martin, and sister of William II FitzMartin (died 1326), Feudal baron of Barnstaple in Devon, without issue.

He also had an illegitimate son also named John. It may be that there was only ever one son named John, the illegitimate one, and it has been suggested that stories of the death of a legitimate son named John is a conflation with the death of Edmund.

== Death and burial ==
He died at Lincoln's Inn, his City of London townhouse, and was buried in nearby St Paul's Cathedral. His grave and monument in the choir were destroyed when the Cathedral was burnt down during the Great Fire of London in 1666. A modern monument in the crypt lists De Lacy among the important graves lost.

== Ancestry ==
Ancestors of Henry de Lacy, Earl of Lincoln

Roger de Lacy, Baron of Pontefract
John de Lacy, Earl of Lincoln
Maud or Matilda de Clere
Edmund de Lacy, Baron of Pontefract
Robert de Quincy
Margaret de Quincy, Countess of Lincoln
Hawise of Chester, Countess of Lincoln suo jure
Henry de Lacy, Earl of Lincoln
Boniface of Saluzzo
Manfred III, Marquess of Saluzzo
Maria di Torres of Sassari
Alice Saluzzo
Amadeus IV, Count of Savoy
Beatrice of Savoy
Marguerite of Burgundy

Peerage of England
Preceded by Margaret de Quincy; Countess of Lincoln suo jure	Earl of Lincoln; 1272–1311	Succeeded by together with her spouse Thomas, 2nd Earl of Lancaster, Earl of Lincoln jure uxoris Alice de Lacy; Countess of Lincoln suo jure
