= Eubulus le Strange, 1st Baron Strange =

14th-century English nobleman

Eubulus le Strange, 1st Baron Strange (died 1335) was an English baron and an especially competent and trusted military officer under King Edward III.

Coat of arms of Eubulo le Strange: Gules, two lions passant Argent, a label of three points Or, each point charged with a lion rampant of the field.

== Biography ==
Eubulo was a younger son of John le Strange and Alianora de Montz.

He married Alice de Lacy, 4th Countess of Lincoln, 5th Countess of Salisbury (both suo jure), as her second husband in 1324. He has been incongruously considered as her lover during her unhappy and childless first marriage to her royal first husband, Thomas, 2nd Earl of Lancaster, who was executed in 1322. (Note: Alice's first marriage lasted from 1294 to Thomas' execution in 1322, though they were divorced in 1318 following an abduction in 1317.) Eubulo and Alice had no children.

Eubulo died on 8 September 1335 while on campaign in the Second War of Scottish Independence (1332–1357). His nephew, Roger le Strange, 4th Baron Strange of Knockyn, aged forty years and more, was his heir.

== Bibliography ==
- Cokayne, George Edward, "The Complete Peerage of England, Scotland, Ireland, Great Britain and the United Kingdom", London: William Pollard & Co, 1953, Ed. 2 Vol XII Part 1.
