= Gilbert de Clare, 7th Earl of Gloucester =

English nobleman (1243–1295)

Gilbert de Clare
- Earl of Hertford; Earl of Gloucester; Lord of Glamorgan
- Coat of Arms of Clare family
- Tenure: 1262–1295
- Predecessor: Richard de Clare, 5th Earl of Hertford
- Successor: Gilbert de Clare, 7th Earl of Hertford
- Other titles: 9th Lord of Clare; 9th Lord of Tonbridge; 8th Lord of Cardigan
- Born: 2 September 1243; Christchurch, Hampshire
- Died: 7 December 1295 (aged 52); Monmouth Castle
- Buried: Tewkesbury Abbey; 51.9903°N 2.1604°W
- Wars and battles: Second Barons' War; Welsh war of 1282
- Noble family: de Clare
- Spouses: Alice de Lusignan of Angoulême; Joan of Acre
- Issue: Isabella de Clare; Joan de Clare; Gilbert de Clare; Eleanor de Clare; Margaret de Clare; Elizabeth de Clare
- Parents: Richard de Clare; Maud de Lacy

Gilbert de Clare, 6th Earl of Hertford, 7th Earl of Gloucester (2 September 1243 – 7 December 1295) was a powerful English magnate. He was also known as "Red" Gilbert de Clare or "The Red Earl", probably because of his hair colour or fiery temper in battle. He held the Lordship of Glamorgan which was one of the most powerful and wealthy of the Welsh Marcher Lordships as well as over 200 English manors (172 in the Honour of Clare).

== Lineage ==
Gilbert de Clare was born at Christchurch, Hampshire, the son of Richard de Clare, Earl of Hertford and Gloucester, and of Maud de Lacy, daughter of John de Lacy and Margaret de Quincy. Gilbert inherited his father's estates in 1262. He took on the titles, including Lord of Glamorgan, from 1263. Being underage at his father's death, he was made a ward of Humphrey de Bohun, 2nd Earl of Hereford.

== Massacre of the Jews at Canterbury ==
During the Second Barons' War in April 1264, Gilbert de Clare led the massacre of the Jews at Canterbury, as Simon de Montfort's supporters had done elsewhere. Gilbert de Clare's castles of Kingston and Tonbridge were taken by the King, Henry III. However, the King allowed Clare's Countess Alice de Lusignan, who was in the latter, to go free because she was his niece; but on 12 May Clare and Montfort were denounced as traitors.

== The Battle of Lewes ==
Two days later, just before the Battle of Lewes, on 14 May, Simon de Montfort knighted the Earl and his brother Thomas. The Earl commanded the central division of the Baronial army, which formed up on the Downs west of Lewes. When Prince Edward had left the field in pursuit of Montfort's routed left wing, the King and Earl of Cornwall were thrown back to the town. Henry took refuge in the Priory of St Pancras, and Gilbert accepted the surrender of the Earl of Cornwall, who had hidden in a windmill. Montfort and the Earl were now supreme and Montfort in effect de facto King of England.

== Excommunication ==
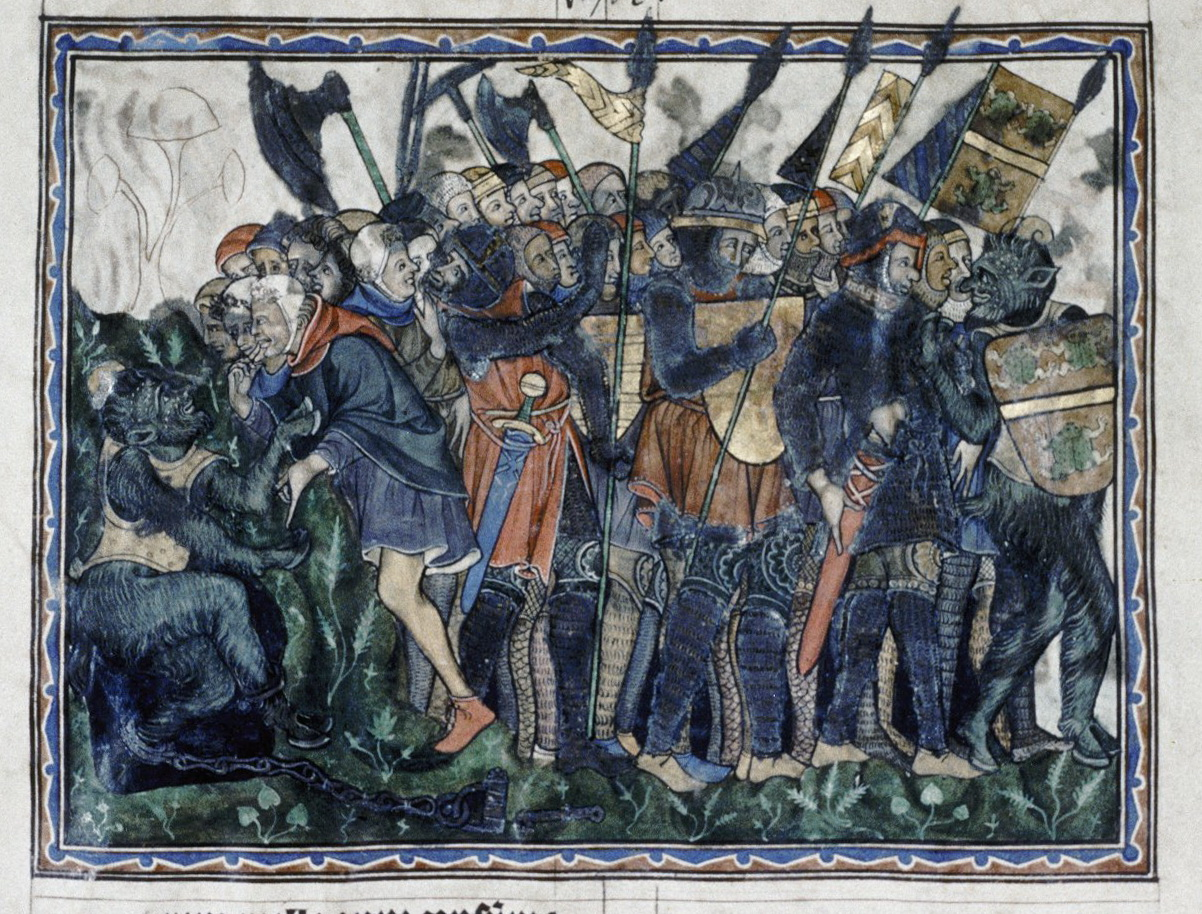
Douce Apocalypse, c. 1265–70. The dragon, who is Satan, comes forth again (Rev. 20:7). Among the flags of the host of Satan is that of Gilbert de Clare, Earl of Gloucester, who had opposed Henry III.

On 20 October 1264, Gilbert and his associates were excommunicated by Pope Clement IV, and his lands were placed under an interdict. In the following month, by which time they had obtained possession of Gloucester and Bristol, the Earl was proclaimed to be a rebel. However at this point he changed sides as he fell out with Montfort and the Earl, to prevent Montfort's escape, destroyed ships at the port of Bristol and the bridge over the River Severn at Gloucester. Having changed sides, Clare shared the Prince's victory at Kenilworth on 16 July, and in the Battle of Evesham, 4 August, in which Montfort was slain, he commanded the second division and contributed largely to the victory. On 24 June 1268, having been reconciled to Prince Edward, he and the prince took the cross together at Northampton.

== Activities as a Marcher Lord ==
In October 1265, as a reward for supporting Prince Edward, Gilbert was given the castle and title of Abergavenny and the honour and castle of Brecknock. At Michaelmas his disputes with Llewelyn the Last were submitted to arbitration, but without a final settlement. Meanwhile, he was building Caerphilly Castle into a fortress. On 6 October 1265 he received the papal absolution of his excommunication, and on 9 October that year the pardon of the King for his former support of Montfort.

At the end of 1268 he refused to obey the King's summons to attend parliament, alleging that, owing to the constant inroads of Llewelyn the Last, his Welsh estates needed his presence for their defence. At the death of Henry III, 16 November 1272, the Earl took the lead in swearing fealty to Edward I, who was then in Sicily on his return from the Crusade. The next day, with the Archbishop of York, he entered London and proclaimed peace to all, Christians and Jews, and for the first time, secured the acknowledgement of the right of the King's eldest son to succeed to the throne immediately. Thereafter, he was joint Guardian of England, during the King's absence, and on the new King's arrival in England, in August 1274, entertained him at Tonbridge Castle.

== The Welsh war in 1282 ==
During Edward's invasion of Wales in 1282, Clare insisted on leading an attack into southern Wales. King Edward made Clare the commander of the southern army invading Wales. However, Clare's army faced disaster after being heavily defeated at the Battle of Llandeilo Fawr. Following this defeat, Clare was relieved of his position as the southern commander and was replaced by William de Valence, 1st Earl of Pembroke (whose son had died during the battle).

== Private Marcher War ==
In 1291, he quarrelled with the Earl of Hereford, Humphrey de Bohun, 3rd Earl of Hereford, grandson of his onetime guardian, about the Lordship of Brecknock, where Bohun accused Clare of building a castle on his land culminated in a private war between them. Although it was a given right for Marcher Lords to wage private war the King tested this right in this case: he first called them before a court of their Marcher peers; then, realising the outcome would be coloured by their likely avoidance of prejudicing one of their greatest rights, they were both called before the superior court, the King's own. At this both were imprisoned by the King, both sentenced to having their lands forfeit for life and Clare, the Earl of Gloucester, as the aggressor, was fined 10,000 marks, and the Earl of Hereford 1,000 marks. They were released almost immediately and both of their lands were completely restored to them—however, they had both been taught a very public lesson and their prestige diminished and the King's authority shown for all.

== Marriage and succession ==
Gilbert married (1st) Alice de Lusignan, also known as Alice de Valence, daughter of Hugh XI of Lusignan and of the family that succeeded the Marshal family to the title of the Earl of Pembroke in the person of William de Valence, 1st Earl of Pembroke. They married in 1253 when Gilbert was ten years old. She was of high birth, being a niece of King Henry (Hugh XI was the king's half-brother). Gilbert and Alice separated in 1267; allegedly, Alice's affections lay with her cousin, Prince Edward. Previous to this, Gilbert and Alice had produced two daughters:

- Isabel de Clare (10 March 1262 – 1333), after a marriage with Guy de Beauchamp, 10th Earl of Warwick having been contemplated, or possibly having taken place and then annulled, married Maurice de Berkeley, 2nd Baron Berkeley
- Joan de Clare (1264 – after 1302), married (1st) Duncan Macduff, 7th Earl of Fife; (2nd) Gervase Avenel.

After his marriage to Alice de Lusignan was annulled in 1285, Gilbert married (2nd) Joan of Acre, a daughter of King Edward I of England and his first wife Eleanor of Castile. King Edward sought to bind Clare, and his assets, more closely to the Crown by this means. By the provisions of the marriage contract, their joint possessions and Clare's extensive lands could only be inherited by a direct descendant, i.e. close to the Crown, and if the marriage proved childless, the lands would pass to any children Joan may have by further marriage.

On 3 July 1290, the Earl gave a great banquet at Clerkenwell to celebrate his marriage of 30 April 1290 with Joan of Acre (1272 – 23 April 1307) after waiting for the Pope to sanction the marriage. Edward then gave large estates to Gilbert, including one in Malvern. Disputed hunting rights on these led to several armed conflicts with Humphrey de Bohun, 3rd Earl of Hereford, that Edward resolved. Gilbert made gifts to the Priory, and also had a "great conflict" about hunting rights and a ditch that he dug, with Thomas de Cantilupe, Bishop of Hereford, that was settled by costly litigation. Gilbert had a similar conflict with Godfrey Giffard, Bishop and Administrator of Worcester Cathedral (and formerly Chancellor of England). Godfrey, who had granted land to the Priory, had jurisdictional disputes about Malvern Priory, resolved by Robert Burnell, the then Chancellor. Thereafter, Gilbert and Joan are said to have taken the Cross and set out for the Holy Land. In September, he signed the Barons' letter to the Pope, and on 2 November, surrendered to the King his claim to the advowson of the Bishopric of Llandaff.

Gilbert and Joan had one son, Gilbert, and three daughters: Eleanor, Margaret and Elizabeth.

- Gilbert, Earl of Hertford and Gloucester, (1291–1314) succeeded to his father's titles, married Maud de Burgh daughter of Richard de Burgh, Earl of Ulster. He was killed at the Battle of Bannockburn.
- Eleanor de Clare (1292–1337) married (1st) Hugh Despenser the Younger, a favourite of her uncle Edward II. Hugh was executed in 1326, and Eleanor married (2nd) William la Zouche Mortimer.
- Margaret de Clare (1293–1342) married (1st) Piers Gaveston, a favourite of her uncle Edward II. Piers was executed in 1312, and Margaret later married (2nd) Hugh de Audley, 1st Earl of Gloucester.
- Elizabeth de Clare (1295–1360) married (1st) in 1308 at Waltham Abbey John de Burgh, (2nd) Theobald of Verdun in 1316, and (3rd) Roger d'Amory in 1317. Each marriage was brief, each produced one child (a son by the 1st, daughters by the 2nd and 3rd), and each left Elizabeth a widow. When her third and last husband died in 1321/22, Elizabeth was at most 27 years old.

== Death and burial ==
He died at Monmouth Castle on 7 December 1295, and was buried at Tewkesbury Abbey, on the left side of his grandfather Gilbert de Clare. His extensive lands were enjoyed by his surviving wife Joan of Acre until her death in 1307.

== Sources ==
- Altschul, Michael (2019). A Baronial Family in Medieval England: The Clares, 1217–1314. Annapolis, Md.: Johns Hopkins University Press. ISBN 9781421436197. OCLC 1326227491.

Gilbert de Clare, 6th Earl of Hertford Born: 2 September 1243 Died: 7 December 1295
Peerage of England
Preceded by Richard de Clare	Earl of Hertford; 1262–1295	Succeeded by Gilbert de Clare
Preceded by Richard de Clare	Earl of Gloucester; 1262–1295	Succeeded by Gilbert de Clare
