= Richard de Clare, 6th Earl of Gloucester =

English nobleman (1222–1262)

Richard de Clare
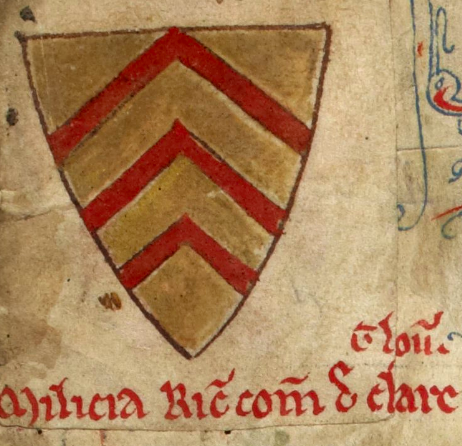
- Arms of Richard referring to his knighting

5th Earl of Hertford; 6th Earl of Gloucester; 2nd Lord of Glamorgan
- Reign: 1230–1262
- Predecessor: Gilbert de Clare, 4th Earl of Hertford
- Successor: Gilbert de Clare, 6th Earl of Hertford
- Other titles: 8th Lord of Clare; 8th Lord of Tonbridge; 7th Lord of Cardigan
- Born: 4 August 1222; Clare Castle, Clare, Suffolk, Kingdom of England
- Died: 14 July 1262 (aged 39); Waltham, Bridge Hundred, Lathe of Borough, Kent, Kingdom of England
- Buried: Tewkesbury Abbey
- Family: de Clare
- Spouse: Margaret de Burgh; Maud de Lacy
- Issue: Isabel, Marchioness of Montferrat; Gilbert de Clare, 7th Earl of Gloucester; Thomas de Clare, Lord of Thomond; Bogo de Clare; Margaret, Countess of Cornwall; Rohese de Mowbray, Baroness de Mowbray; Eglentina de Clare
- Father: Gilbert de Clare, 4th Earl of Hertford
- Mother: Isabel Marshal

Richard de Clare, 5th Earl of Hertford, 6th Earl of Gloucester, 2nd Lord of Glamorgan, 8th Lord of Clare (4 August 1222 – 14 July 1262) was the son of Gilbert de Clare, 4th Earl of Hertford, and Isabel Marshal. He was also a powerful Marcher Lord in Wales and inherited the Lordship of Glamorgan upon the death of his father. He played a prominent role in the constitutional crisis of 1258–1263.

== Early life ==
On his father's death, when he became Earl of Gloucester (October 1230), Richard was entrusted first to the guardianship of Hubert de Burgh. On Hubert's fall, his guardianship was given to Peter des Roches (c. October 1232); and in 1235 to Gilbert, Earl Marshall.

== Marriage ==
Richard's first marriage to Margaret or Megotta, as she was also called, ended with either an annulment or her death in November 1237. They were both about 14 or 15. The marriage of Hubert de Burgh's daughter Margaret to Richard de Clare, the young Earl of Gloucester, brought de Burgh into some trouble in 1236, for the earl was as yet a minor and in the wardship of King Henry III, and the marriage had been celebrated without the royal licence. Hubert, however, protested that the match was not of his making, and promised to pay the king some money, so the matter passed by for the time. Even before Margaret died, the Earl of Lincoln offered 5,000 marks to King Henry to secure Richard for his own daughter. This offer was accepted, and Richard's second marriage, on 2 February 1238, was to Maud de Lacy, daughter of John de Lacy, 1st Earl of Lincoln.

== Military career ==
Richard joined in the Barons' letter to the Pope in 1246 against the exactions of the Curia in England. He was among those in opposition to the King's half-brothers, who in 1247 visited England, where they were very unpopular, but afterwards, he was reconciled to them.

In August 1252/3 the King crossed over to Gascony with his army, and to his great indignation, Richard refused to accompany him and went to Ireland instead. In August 1255 the king sent him and John Maunsel to Edinburgh to find out the truth about reports which had reached the King that his son-in-law, Alexander III, King of Scotland, was being coerced by Robert de Roos and John Balliol. They were to try to bring the young King and Queen to him. The Earl and his companion, pretending to be the two of Roos's knights, obtained entry to Edinburgh Castle, and gradually introduced their attendants, so that they had a force sufficient for their defence. They gained access to the Scottish Queen, who complained to them that she and her husband had been kept apart. They threatened Roos with dire punishments, so that he promised to go to the King.

Meanwhile, the Scottish magnates, indignant that their castle of Edinburgh was in English hands, proposed to besiege it, but they desisted when they found they would be besieging their King and Queen. The King of Scotland apparently travelled south with Richard, for on 24 September they were with King Henry III at Newminster, Northumberland. In July 1258 he fell ill, supposedly poisoned together with his brother William by his steward, Walter de Scotenay. He recovered, but his brother died.

== Death and legacy ==
Richard died at John de Criol's Manor of Asbenfield in Waltham, near Canterbury, on 14 July 1262 at the age of 39. On the following Monday, he was carried to Canterbury where a requiem mass was sung; his body was then transported about 45 miles (72 km) to the canons' church at Tonbridge and interred in the choir. From there it was taken to Tewkesbury Abbey and buried on 28 July 1262, with great solemnity in the presence of two bishops and eight abbots in the presbytery at his father's right hand. Richard's own arms were: Or, three chevronels gules.

Richard left extensive property, distributed across numerous counties. Details of these holdings were reported in a series of inquisitions post-mortem that took place after his death.

== Family ==
Richard had no children by his first wife, Margaret de Burgh. By his second wife, Maud de Lacy, daughter of the Surety John de Lacy and Margaret de Quincy. They had:

- Isabel de Clare (1240 – before 1271), married as his first wife, William VII, Marquess of Montferrat,
- Gilbert de Clare, 6th Earl of Hertford, 7th Earl of Gloucester (2 September 1243 – 7 December 1295),; he married secondly Joan of Acre, by whom he had issue.
- Thomas de Clare, Lord of Thomond (1245 – 29 August 1287),
- Bogo de Clare, Chancellor of Llandaff (21 July 1248 – 1294)
- Margaret de Clare (1250 – 1312/1313), married Edmund, 2nd Earl of Cornwall.
- Rohese de Clare (17 October 1252 – after 1316), married Roger de Mowbray, 1st Baron Mowbray,
- Eglantine de Clare (1257 – 1257)

Richard's widow Maud, who had the Manor of Clare and the Manor and Castle of Usk and other lands for her dower, erected a splendid tomb for her late husband at Tewkesbury. She arranged for the marriages of her children. She died before 10 March 1288/9.

== Ancestry ==
Ancestors of Richard de Clare, 6th Earl of Gloucester

8. Roger de Clare, 2nd Earl of Hertford
4. Richard de Clare, 3rd Earl of Hertford
9. Maud de St. Hilary
2. Gilbert de Clare, 4th Earl of Hertford
10. William Fitz Robert, 2nd Earl of Gloucester
5. Amice FitzRobert, Countess of Gloucester
11. Hawise de Beaumont
1. Richard de Clare, 6th Earl of Gloucester
12. John Marshal
6. William Marshal, 1st Earl of Pembroke
13. Sybil of Salisbury
3. Isabel Marshal
14. Richard de Clare, 2nd Earl of Pembroke
7. Isabel de Clare, 4th Countess of Pembroke
15. Eva MacMurrough

== See also ==
- Holy Jesus Hospital

== Sources ==
- Altschul, Michael (2019). A Baronial Family in Medieval England: The Clares, 1217-1314. Johns Hopkins University Press.
- Blakely, Ruth Margaret (2005). The Brus Family in England and Scotland, 1100-1295. The Boydell Press.
- Kinkade, Richard P. (2004). "Beatrice "Contesson" of Savoy (c. 1250–1290): The Mother of Juan Manuel". La corónica: A Journal of Medieval Hispanic Languages, Literatures, and Cultures. 2, Number 3, Summer (3): 163–225. doi:10.1353/cor.2004.0017. S2CID 163041548.
- Weikert, Katherine (2017). "The Princesses Who Might Have Been Hostages: The Custody and Marriages of Margaret and Isabella of Scotland, 1209-1220s". In Bennett, Matthew; Weikert, Katherine (eds.). Medieval Hostageship c.700-c.1500: Hostage, Captive, Prisoner of War, Guarantee, Peacemaker. Routledge. pp. 122–139.
- Wilkinson, Louise J. (2016). "Reformers and Royalists: Aristocratic Women in Politics, 1258-1267". In Jobson, Adrian (ed.). Baronial Reform and Revolution in England, 1258-1267. The Boydell Press. pp. 152–166.

Peerage of England
Preceded by Gilbert de Clare	Earl of Hertford; 1230–1262	Succeeded by Gilbert de Clare
Preceded by Gilbert de Clare	Earl of Gloucester; 1230–1262	Succeeded by Gilbert de Clare
