= Alice de Lacy, Countess of Lincoln =

4th Countess of Lincoln; born in Wales

Alice de Lacy
- Countess of Lincoln and Salisbury
- Born: 25 December 1281; Denbigh Castle, Denbigh
- Died: 2 October 1348 (aged 66); Barlings Abbey, Lincolnshire
- Spouses: Thomas, 2nd Earl of Lancaster m. 1294; his d. 1322 (or div. c. 1318); Eubulus le Strange, 1st Baron Strange m. bef. 1324; dec. 1335; Hugh de Freyne, Baron Freyne m. bef. 1336; dec. c. 1336
- Father: Henry de Lacy, Earl of Lincoln
- Mother: Margaret Longespée

Alice de Lacy, suo jure 4th Countess of Lincoln, suo jure 5th Countess of Salisbury (25 December 1281 – 2 October 1348) was an English peeress, descendant of both English and Welsh royalty.

== Life ==
Born on Christmas Day 1281 at Denbigh Castle, Alice was the only daughter and heir of Henry de Lacy, Earl of Lincoln and Margaret Longespée, Countess of Salisbury suo jure (in her own right). Her mother Margaret was the granddaughter of the prince of North Wales, Llywelyn ab Iorwerth, and the great-granddaughter and ultimate heir of one of the illegitimate sons of Henry II of England, William Longespée (Longsword), whose nickname became his surname.

Tragic accidents resulted in the deaths of Alice's two brothers in childhood. Edmund drowned in a well at Denbigh Castle and John fell to his death from a parapet at Pontefract Castle. This made Alice the heir presumptive to two earldoms, one from her father and one from her mother, which she would inherit if her parents had no further children. With Alice belonging to such an influential and wealthy family, King Edward I arranged for her betrothal "in her 9th year" to his nephew, Thomas of Lancaster, himself heir to the earldoms of Lancaster, Leicester and Derby. They were married on 28 October 1294, when Alice was 13 years old and Thomas about 16.

By this time, the probability of Alice's parents begetting a male heir had considerably diminished, and the marriage settlement reflects the strong probability that Alice would be one of the great heiresses of the land. The bulk of her vast inheritance from her father, which included the Earldom of Lincoln and many other estates, was to go to Thomas, with reversion to Thomas's heirs. In other words, even if Alice and Thomas had no children together, her estate would devolve upon her husband's heirs rather than upon her blood relatives. Also, if Alice outlived Thomas, then on her own death, her father's inheritance would pass to Thomas's heirs as her father had come to an agreement with the King that, should Alice have no children, her father's Earldom of Lincoln would pass into the royal family on her death. The marriage was not successful. The couple had no children, and they lived quite separate lives. Alice mostly lived alone in her castle of Pickering, Yorkshire, while Thomas took a host of mistresses and fathered at least two illegitimate children.

== Countess ==
Alice's mother died in 1309 or 1310, some fifteen years after the wedding. Alice inherited her titles and estates, becoming the countess of Salisbury. Her husband, Thomas, became the earl of Salisbury jure uxoris (by right of his wife).

A couple of years later, on the death of her father in February 1311, Alice became the countess of Lincoln. Her husband, Thomas of Lancaster, became the earl of Lincoln jure uxoris, inherited all the lands of Alice's father by right of his wife, and paid homage to Edward II of England for them shortly after his father-in-law's death.

With the three earldoms that he had inherited from his father in 1296, and the control of the two earldoms of his wife, this made Thomas of Lancaster the richest and most powerful man in England.

== First abduction ==
In the spring of 1317 Alice was abducted from her manor of Canford, Dorset, by some of the household Knights of John de Warenne, Earl of Surrey and taken to the Warenne stronghold of Castle Reigate, though questions were raised by contemporary chroniclers over the degree to which Alice may have been complicit. The disreputable Warenne is thought to have carried out the abduction in order to humiliate Thomas of Lancaster, who had helped block Warenne's divorce, and had persuaded the Bishop of Chichester to prosecute Warenne for his adultery with his mistress which had resulted in Warenne's excommunication in 1316.

There is a story that one of the Knights who abducted her on Warenne's behalf, described as an undersized hunchback named Richard de St. Martin, claimed that Alice was his wife on the ground that he had carried her off and married her before she was betrothed to the Earl of Lancaster. There can be no truth in this story as she was only "in her 9th year" when she was betrothed, and only 12 years old when she married Thomas. This story, however, shows the lengths to which Warenne may have stooped to humiliate Thomas.

After Alice was abducted her husband Thomas then waged a private war on Warenne, but never once asked for Alice's return. Thomas also thought King Edward II, his cousin, had been involved in the planning of the abduction. It is not known when Alice was released, and her whereabouts from 1317 to 1322 are uncertain. Some also believe, based on an old ballad, that she divorced Thomas during this time. However, her subsequent treatment by the King indicates that she had remained married to Thomas.

Thomas of Lancaster was captured at Boroughbridge after the failure of his rebellion against the King. On 22 March 1322 he was executed for treason at what had been Alice's family home of Pontefract Castle but that had become his favourite residence. With Thomas gone Alice should have had control of the vast inheritances from both of her parents for the first time. Thomas's estates were forfeited to the Crown, but that could not legally include the estates that he controlled by right of his wife and that was her inheritance. However, the King found other ways to punish the traitor's widow and confiscate her lands.

== Imprisonment ==
A few days later in March 1322, the King had Alice arrested and imprisoned at York, along with her stepmother, Joan Martin, whose second husband, Nicholas de Audeley, had died 5 years earlier in 1316. (Joan died in October 1322.) Why Joan, who was a similar age to Alice was also imprisoned is unknown. It could have been out of spite from the King who in 1318 had accused Joan of "scheming to thwart" the hearing of a legal case, or simply because she was there at the time of Alice's arrest.

Imprisoned and under the threat of execution, Alice surrendered into the King's hands on 26 June 1322, a great part of the lands which she had inherited from her father, in order to secure the confirmation of some portion of these possessions to herself. This was effectively the extortion by the King of her father's family estates that had predated the Earldom of Lincoln such as Pontefract, though she was then permitted to hold some of her estates in life tenure by the king's "special grace". Many of her extorted estates were given by the King to the elder Hugh Despenser and his son Hugh Despenser the Younger, the King's nephew-by-marriage and favourite, who had both returned to England from exile in May 1322 and were now both involved in assisting the King in his attempt to "legally" obtain Alice's estates. Notably the elder Hugh Despenser was given Denbigh. To help add credence to the "legality" of the disposal of her lands to the Despenser's the King had Alice style Hugh le Despenser the younger as "kinsman".

Alice was not released until she paid a staggering indemnity of £20,000 to the Crown. Only by paying the indemnity was she to be allowed to remarry if she so wished, and to be granted those lands that remained of her inheritance. On 20 September 1322, Edward granted the Constableship of Lincoln Castle to Alice as her right and inheritance, and restored to her for life the annuity which her father had received in lieu of the third penny of the county of Lincoln. Her Earldom of Salisbury had reverted to the Crown in March 1322, but her Earldom of Lincoln was restored to her in December 1322.

Even so, on her release, Alice was placed on virtual house arrest for her "own protection". During this time she was compelled to dispose of more of her inheritance, this time from lands she had inherited from her mother. John de Warenne, the man who had abducted her in 1317, was given a life grant of many of her manors in the West, and Hugh Despenser the Younger was given one of her manors in Lincolnshire. Some of her many forfeited lands were returned to her, but only for life, by Edward III of England in 1331.

== Second marriage ==
In 1324, possibly before Easter and definitely before 10 November, Alice married Eubulus le Strange. At the age of 42, it was not expected that she would bear any children in this union, and this was to be the case. This marriage appears to have been a loving, happy union. Eubulus described her in documents as his 'dear and loving companion' and never claimed the title of Earl of Lincoln by right of his wife as he was entitled to do. The King was worried, however, and required that all the estates that Alice had been forced to relinquish before this marriage had to be confirmed so that Eubulus could not make a claim on them by right of his wife. As a reward for Alice's co-operation, the King confirmed the life grants he had made to Alice, and discharged her of her first husband Thomas's debts.

In January 1327 Edward II, who had been imprisoned in 1326 by his Queen Isabella and Roger Mortimer, was forced to abdicate in favour of his son - it was generally believed that Edward II was then murdered by an agent of Isabella and Mortimer in September 1327. As her son Edward was still in his minority, Isabella became regent. Alice's estates that had been given to the Despensers, reverted to Edward II in 1326 when the Despensers were executed by Isabella. Isabella now had control of these estates which nominally belonged to her son. Isabella appropriated for herself much of Alice's rightful inheritance, while Roger Mortimer took possession of Denbigh.

In 1330, Edward III gained control of the government from his mother and Mortimer. He assumed most of Alice's inheritance and gave it, including the lordship of Denbigh, to William Montacute, his great friend who had helped him to overthrow Mortimer. Montacute also received Alice's earldom of Salisbury which had been taken from Alice in 1322. Since Alice's husband Eubulus was involved in Edward III's plot of 1330 to bring down Isabella and Mortimer, Alice and he were rewarded by the return of some of her estates. This was probably the most secure time in Alice's adult life. Alice and her second husband were the recipients of many honours, grants of land and money, and responsibility. Eubulus died in September 1335. In her mourning, Alice took a vow of chastity.

== Second abduction ==
Alice, with her rich inheritance, did not remain a widow for long, though she was at this time 54 years of age. Late in 1335 or early in 1336 she was abducted from the castle of Bolingbroke and, ignoring her vow of chastity, 'raped' by Hugh de Freyne, Baron Freyne. (A letter from the Pope seems to reproach Alice for "allowing" the rape to happen.) Alice became de Freyne's wife before 20 March 1336. Historian Michael Prestwich describes the abduction thus, in his The Three Edwards:

[I]n a dramatic scene in Bolingbroke Castle in 1336 she was again abducted, this time by Hugh de Frenes. He entered the castle with the complicity of some of her servants and seized her in the hall. She was permitted to go up to her chamber to collect her things together, and when she came down was placed firmly on horseback. Only then did she realize the gravity of her situation, and she promptly fell off in an attempt to escape. She was put back, with a groom mounted behind her to hold her on, and led off to Somerton Castle. There, according to the record, Hugh raped her in breach of the king's peace. Since she was by then in her mid-fifties, it is likely Hugh was attracted more by her vast estates than by her physical charms. As frequently happened in medieval cases of rape, the couple soon married; it is possible that she was not a wholly unwilling victim.

The marriage had taken place without the King's licence, so orders were sent to the Sheriffs of Lincoln, Oxford, and many other counties, to take into the King's hands the lands, goods, and chattels of Hugh de Freyne and Alice, Countess of Lincoln, and to keep the same until further order; the said Hugh and Alice having escaped from the castle of Somerton, where the King had ordered them to be kept separately, because Hugh took her from the castle of Bolingbroke by force. Apparently, the offence was condoned, probably by payment of a fine, as an order was issued on 20 March 1336, to deliver to Alice and Hugh de Freyne a message at Newbury, Berkshire, and other manors were restored to her in the following year.

Hugh de Freyne didn't live very long to enjoy her vast inheritance as he died in December 1336 or early 1337, and she returned to her vow of chastity.

== Second imprisonment ==
On 4 May 1337 Alice complained that she had been imprisoned yet again. Eubulus's nephew and heir Roger le Strange (who would succeed on Alice's death to such property as Eubulus had held in his own right), together with Sir John de Lacy of Lacyes (Alice's illegitimate half-brother), and others, broke into her castle of Bolingbroke, imprisoned her there, took away 20 of her horses, carried away her goods, and assaulted her men and servants. The quarrel was made up with Roger before long, and on 20 June 1337, Alice obtained licence to grant to Roger her life estate in some manors that had been granted by the King jointly to Alice and Eubulus.

Alice is referred to in documents of Edward II's reign (during the time of her marriage to Thomas, her first widowhood, and the early years of her marriage to Eubulus) as Lady Alice, or Alice de Lacy, Countess of Lincoln. In later life, she called herself Countess of Lincoln or Widow of Eubulus Lestrange. Alice lived until the age of 66 in October 1348 and was buried next to her beloved Eubulus at Barlings Abbey. A few months before her death, Alice's nephew-by-marriage from her first marriage to Thomas of Lancaster, Henry of Grosmont, 1st Duke of Lancaster, appeared as a petitioner on Alice's behalf in a legal action (an oyer and terminer) about vandalism to one of the estates. His actions, however, were not without personal motive as by her first marriage settlement he was the heir to the remaining lands that she held from her father's estate, and the legal action was about vandalism to and poaching from one of the estates that he was to inherit. Nevertheless, historian Linda Mitchell believes that his assumption of responsibility on Alice's behalf can be seen "as a mark of respect for the woman wronged so shamefully by his family." For the last 10 years of her life, after the death of de Freyne, Alice also appears to have had the support of Edward III in the commissions of oyer and terminers that Alice requested during this time seem to have been promptly appointed and thoroughly investigated.

== Death ==
Alice died childless at Barlings Abbey in 1348. Her Earldom of Lincoln became extinct upon her death. By the terms of her first marriage settlement, her remaining lands from her father's inheritance went to her nephew-by-marriage Henry of Grosmont, 1st Duke of Lancaster, and the remaining lands from her mother's inheritance were inherited by James de Audley, her Longespee cousin through his paternal line, who also happened to be her stepmother and father's widow Joan Martin's son from her second marriage. However, weighed against the extensive manors which Alice had once possessed in right of her inheritance as Countess of Lincoln and of Salisbury, she had comparatively little to leave after her death. Many of her lands had been forfeited to the Crown in 1322 and 1323, and for those lands that were restored, she had accepted a life interest. Other grants of lands from the King jointly to Alice and her second husband, Eubulus le Strange, she held a life estate in after Eubulus' death, and these went to Eubulus' heir, his nephew Roger le Strange.

== Bibliography ==
- Mitchell, Linda E., Portraits of medieval women: family, marriage, and politics in England, 1255-1350
- Warner, Kathryn Abandonment and Abduction: The Eventful Life of Alice de Lacy
- Le Strange, Hamon, Le Strange records: a chronicle of the early Le Stranges of Norfolk and the March of Wales A.D. 1100-1310, with the lines of Knockin and Blackmere continued to their extinction (1916)
- Whittaker, T.D., An History of the Original parish of Whalley and Honor of Clitheroe, 1872
- Fryde, Natalie (1979). The tyranny and fall of Edward II, 1321-1326. Cambridge: Cambridge University Press. ISBN 0-521-54806-3.
- Holmes, G. A. (1955). "A Protest against the Despensers, 1326". Speculum. 30 (2). Speculum, Vol. 30, No. 2: 207–212. doi:10.2307/2848467. JSTOR 2848467. S2CID 162866779.
- J. R. Maddicott, ‘Thomas of Lancaster, second earl of Lancaster, second earl of Leicester, and earl of Lincoln (c.1278–1322)’, Oxford Dictionary of National Biography, Oxford University Press, September 2004; online edn, January 2007

Peerage of England
Preceded by Henry de Lacy	Countess of Lincoln; 1311–1348 with Thomas (1311-1322)	reverted to Crown
Preceded by Margaret Longespée	Countess of Salisbury; 1309–1322 with Thomas	reverted to Crown
