= Hawise of Chester, 1st Countess of Lincoln =

Anglo-Norman noblewoman and wealthy heiress

Hawise of Chester
- Countess of Lincoln suo jure
- Born: 1180; Chester, Cheshire, England
- Died: 6 June 1241/3 May 1243
- Noble family: de Kevelioc
- Spouse: Robert de Quincy
- Issue: Margaret de Quincy, 2nd Countess of Lincoln suo jure
- Father: Hugh de Kevelioc, 5th Earl of Chester
- Mother: Bertrade de Montfort of Evreux

Hawise of Chester, 1st Countess of Lincoln suo jure (1180 – March 1243), was an Anglo-Norman noblewoman and a wealthy heiress. Her father was Hugh de Kevelioc, 5th Earl of Chester. She was the sister and a co-heiress of Ranulf de Blondeville, 6th Earl of Chester. She was created suo jure 1st Countess of Lincoln in 1232. She was the wife of Robert de Quincy, by whom she had one daughter, Margaret, who became heiress to her title and estates. She was also known as Hawise of Kevelioc.

== Family ==
Hawise was born in 1180 in Chester, Cheshire, England, the youngest child of Hugh de Kevelioc, 5th Earl of Chester and Bertrade de Montfort of Évreux, a cousin of King Henry II of England. Hawise had five siblings, including Maud of Chester, Countess of Huntingdon, Mabel of Chester, Countess of Arundel, Agnes of Chester, Countess of Derby, Beatrice de Kevelioc and a brother Ranulf de Blondeville, 6th Earl of Chester. She also had an illegitimate half-sister, Amice of Chester who married Ralph de Mainwaring, Justice of Chester by whom she had children.

Hawise's paternal grandparents were Ranulf de Gernon, 4th Earl of Chester, and Maud of Gloucester, the granddaughter of King Henry I of England, and her maternal grandparents were Simon III de Montfort and Mahaut.

In 1181, when Hawise was a year old, her father died. He had served in Henry II's Irish campaigns after his estates had been restored to him in 1177. They had been confiscated by the King as a result of his having taken part in the baronial Revolt of 1173–1174. Her only brother Ranulf succeeded him as the 6th Earl of Chester.

Hawise inherited the castle and manor of Bolingbroke, and other large estates from her brother to whom she was co-heiress after his death on 26 October 1232. Hawise had already become 1st Countess of Lincoln in April 1231, when her brother Ranulf de Blondeville, 1st Earl of Lincoln resigned the title in her favour. He granted her the title by a formal charter under his seal which was confirmed by King Henry III. She was formally invested as suo jure 1st Countess of Lincoln by King Henry III on 27 October 1232 the day after her brother's death.

Less than a month later, in the same manner as her brother Ranulf de Blondeville, 1st Earl of Lincoln, Hawise likewise made an inter vivos gift, after receiving dispensation from the crown, of the Earldom of Lincoln to her daughter Margaret de Quincy who then became 2nd Countess of Lincoln suo jure and her son-in-law John de Lacy, Baron of Pontefract who then became the 2nd Earl of Lincoln by right of his wife. (John de Lacy is mistakenly called the 1st Earl of Lincoln in many references.) They were formally invested by King Henry III as Countess and Earl of Lincoln on 23 November 1232.

== Marriage and issue ==
Sometime before 1206, Hawise married Robert de Quincy, oldest son of Saer de Quincy, 1st Earl of Winchester and his wife Margaret de Beaumont of Leicester. The marriage produced one daughter:

- Margaret de Quincy, 2nd Countess of Lincoln suo jure (c.1206 – March 1266), married firstly in 1221 John de Lacy, 2nd Earl of Lincoln by whom she had two children, Edmund de Lacy, Baron of Pontefract, and Maud de Lacy; she married secondly on 6 January 1242 Walter Marshal, 5th Earl of Pembroke.

Hawise's husband Robert died in 1217 in London. He had been accidentally poisoned through medicine prepared by a Cistercian monk. Robert and his father had both been excommunicated in December 1215 as a result of the latter having been one of the 25 sureties of Magna Carta six months before. Hawise died March 1243. She was more than sixty years of age.

Hawise married second Warren de Bostoke.

== Sources ==
- Cokayne, George Edward (1959). The Complete Peerage of England, Scotland, Ireland, Great Britain and the United Kingdom: pt. 1. Skelmersdale to Towton. St. Catherine Press.
- Crouch, David, ed. (2015). The Acts and Letters of the Marshal Family: Marshals of England and Earls of Pembroke, 1145–1248. Cambridge University Press.
- Gee, Loveday Lewes (2002). Women, Art and Patronage from Henry III to Edward III: 1216-1377. The Boydell Press. ISBN 978-0851158617.
- Wilkinson, Louise J. (2015). Women in Thirteenth-Century Lincolnshire. Boydell Press.

Peerage of England
Preceded by Ranulf de Blondeville	Countess of Lincoln suo jure 1231–1232	Succeeded by John de Lacy together with and by right of his wife Margaret de Quincy suo jure
