= John de Lacy, Earl of Lincoln =

English Constable of Chester (1192–1240)

John de Lacy
- 2nd Earl of Lincoln, of the fourth creation
- Arms of John de Lacy, as Lord of Pontefract Castle, and at the sealing of Magna Carta: Or, a lion rampant purpure
- Predecessor: Hawise of Chester, 1st Countess of Lincoln (suo jure)
- Successor: Margaret de Quincy, Countess of Lincoln (suo jure)
- Born: c. 1192
- Died: 22 July 1240
- Buried: Cistercian Abbey of Stanlow, in County Chester
- Offices: Constable of Chester
- Noble family: de Lacy
- Spouses: Alice de L'Aigle; Margaret de Quincy
- Issue: Joan de Lacy; Edmund de Lacy, Baron of Pontefract; Maud de Lacy
- Parents: Roger de Lacy; Maud de Clare

John de Lacy, 2nd Earl of Lincoln (c. 1192 – 22 July 1240) was hereditary Constable of Chester, 7th Baron of Pontefract, 8th Baron of Halton and 8th Lord of Bowland.

== Origins ==
John was the eldest son and heir of Roger de Lacy (1170–1211), hereditary Constable of Chester, and Maud de Clare.

== Career ==
John was hereditary Constable of Chester and in 1214 undertook the payment of 7,000 marks to King John, in the space of four years, for livery of the lands of his inheritance, and to be discharged of all his father's debts due to the Exchequer, further obligating himself by oath, that in case he should ever swerve from his allegiance, and adhere to the king's enemies, all of his possessions should devolve upon the crown, promising also, that he would not marry without the king's licence. By this agreement it was arranged that the king should retain the castles of Pontefract and Dunnington, still in his own hands; and that he, the said John, should allow 40 pounds per year, for the custody of those fortresses. But the next year he had Dunnington restored to him, upon hostages.

John was one of the earliest who took up arms at the time of Magna Carta, and was appointed to see that the new statutes were properly carried into effect and observed in the counties of York and Nottingham. He was one of the twenty-five barons charged with overseeing the observance of Magna Carta in 1215.

John was excommunicated by the Pope. Upon the accession of King Henry III (1216-1272), he joined a party of noblemen and made a pilgrimage to the Holy Land, and did good service at the Siege of Damietta (1218–19). In 1232 he was made Earl of Lincoln and in 1240, Governor of Chester and Beeston Castles. In 1237 his lordship was one of those appointed to prohibit Oto, the pope's prelate, from establishing anything derogatory to the king's crown and dignity, in the council of prelates then assembled; and the same year he was appointed Sheriff of Cheshire, being likewise constituted Governor of Chester Castle.

In the contest which occurred in 1232 between the king and Richard Marshal, 3rd Earl of Pembroke, Earl Marshal, Matthew Paris states that the Earl of Lincoln was brought over to the king's party, with John of Scotland, 7th Earl of Chester, by Peter des Roches, Bishop of Winchester, for a bribe of 1,000 marks.

== Marriage and issue ==
John married twice:

First in 1214 at Pontefract, to Alice (d.1216, Pontefract), daughter of Gilbert, lord of L'Aigle, by whom he had one daughter: Joan de Lacy.

Second, in 1221 he married Margaret de Quincy, only daughter and heiress of Robert de Quincy (son of Saer de Quincy, 1st Earl of Winchester) by his wife Hawyse de Blondeville/de Mechines, 4th sister and co-heiress of Ranulph de Blondeville/de Mechines, 4th Earl of Chester, Earl of Lincoln. Ranulph granted the Earldom of Lincoln to his sister Hawyse, "to the end that she might be countess, and that her heirs might also enjoy the earldom"; the grant was confirmed by the king, and at Hawyse's special request John de Lacy received royal licence to succeed de Blondeville and by charter dated at Northampton 23 November 1232, was created Earl of Lincoln, with remainder to the heirs of his body by his wife Margaret de Quincy. John and Margaret had one son and two daughters, including: Edmund de Lacy, Baron of Pontefract, son and heir; and Maud de Lacy, who married Richard de Clare, 6th Earl of Gloucester. Margaret survived John and remarried twice, to Walter Marshal, 5th Earl of Pembroke in 1242, and c. 1252 to Richard de Wiltshire. She had no issue with either of her later spouses.

== Death and burial ==
He died on 22 July 1240 and was buried at Stanlow Abbey, in County Chester. The monk Matthew Paris, recorded: "On the 22nd day of July, in the year 1240, which was St. Magdalen's Day, John, Earl of Lincoln, after suffering from a long illness went the way of all flesh".

Peerage of England
| Preceded by Hawise of Chester; 1st Countess of Lincoln suo jure | Earl of Lincoln together with his wife Margaret de Quincy; 2nd Countess of Lincoln suo jure 1232–1240 | Succeeded by reverted solely to his wife Margaret de Quincy; 2nd Countess of Lincoln suo jure |
