= Thomas, 2nd Earl of Lancaster =

English nobleman (c. 1278–1322)

Thomas
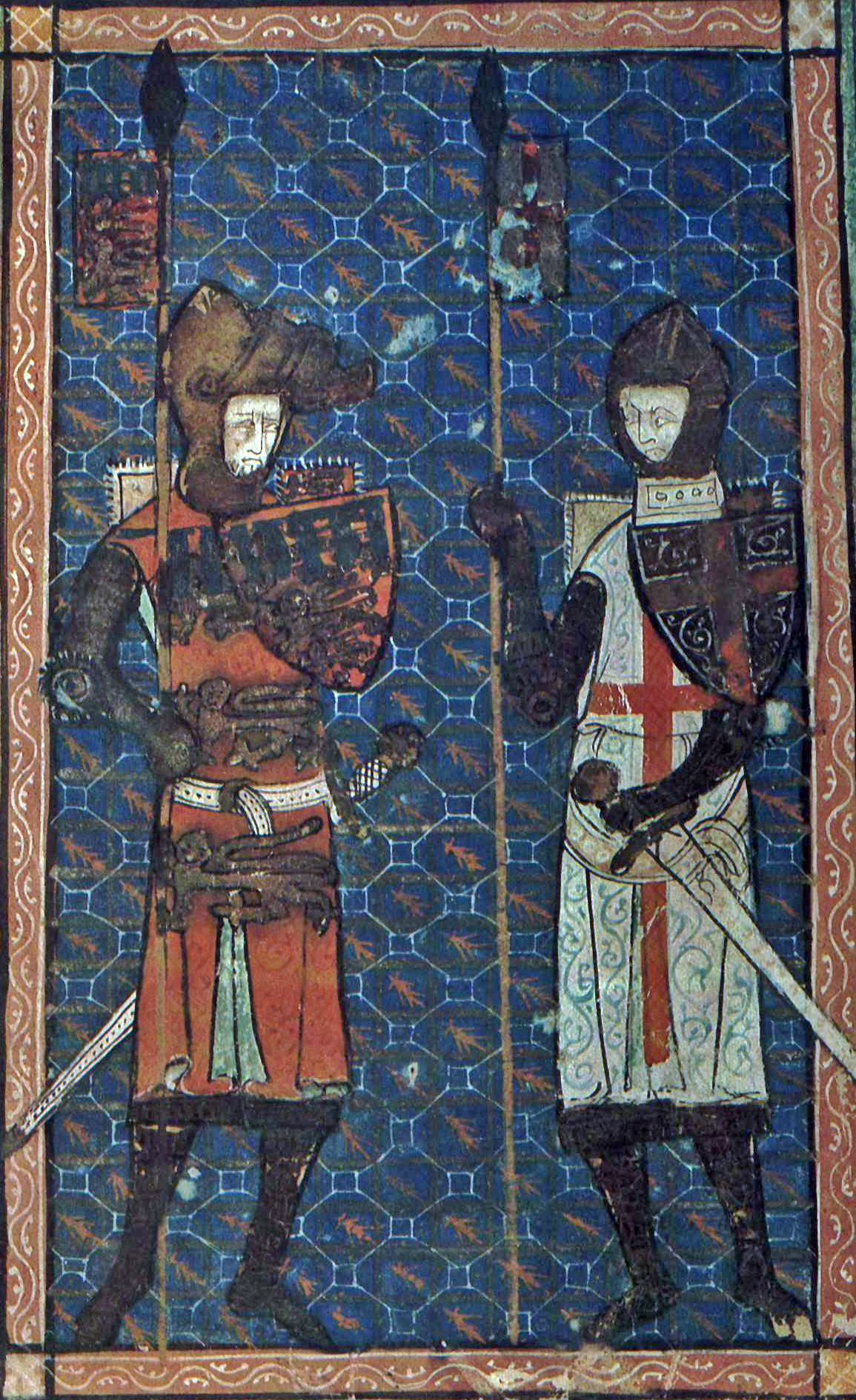
- Thomas (left) with St. George (right)

Earl of Lancaster, Leicester, Derby, Lincoln, and Salisbury
- Predecessor: Edmund Crouchback, 1st Earl of Lancaster
- Successor: Henry, 3rd Earl of Lancaster
- Born: c. 1278
- Died: 22 March 1322 (aged ~43–44); Pontefract, Yorkshire
- Cause of death: Execution by beheading
- Noble family: Lancaster
- Spouse: Alice de Lacy, 4th Countess of Lincoln (m. 1294; div. c. 1318)
- Father: Edmund Crouchback
- Mother: Blanche of Artois

Thomas, 2nd Earl of Lancaster (c. 1278 – 22 March 1322) was an English nobleman of the first House of Lancaster, a cadet branch of the royal Plantagenet dynasty. He held the titles of Earl of Lancaster, Leicester, and Derby from 1296 until his death in 1322, and also those of Earl of Lincoln and Salisbury jure uxoris from 1311 to 1322. As one of the most powerful barons in England, Thomas became a leading figure in the baronial opposition to his first cousin, King Edward II.

== Early life and marriage ==
Thomas was the eldest son of Edmund Crouchback and Blanche of Artois, Queen Dowager of Navarre and niece of King Louis IX of France. Crouchback was a son of King Henry III of England. Through his mother, Thomas was a half-brother of Queen Joan I of Navarre.

His marriage to Alice de Lacy was not successful. They had no children together, while he fathered, illegitimately, two sons named John and Thomas. In 1317, Alice was abducted from her manor at Canford, Dorset, by Richard de St Martin, a knight in the service of John de Warenne, 7th Earl of Surrey. This incident caused a feud between Lancaster and Surrey; Lancaster seized two of Surrey's castles in retaliation. King Edward then intervened, and the two earls came to an uneasy truce. Thomas continued to hold the powerful earldoms of Lincoln and Salisbury. This was due to the marriage contract the two families had agreed upon; upon the death of his father-in-law, Thomas would hold these earldoms in his own right, not, as would be expected, in right of his wife.

== Earl of Lancaster ==
Arms of Thomas: Gules, three lions passant guardant in pale or, armed and langued azure, overall a label of three points azure, each point charged with three Fleur-de-lis or

On reaching full age, he became hereditary sheriff of Lancashire. However, he spent most of the next ten years fighting for Edward I in Scotland, leaving the shrievalty in the care of deputies. He was present at the Battle of Falkirk in 1298 as part of Edward I's wing of the army.

He served in the coronation of his cousin, King Edward II of England, on 25 February 1308, carrying Curtana, the sword of Edward the Confessor. At the beginning of the king's reign, Lancaster openly supported Edward, but as the conflict between the king and the nobles wore on, Lancaster's allegiances changed. He despised the royal favourite, Piers Gaveston, who mocked him as "the Fiddler" and swore revenge when Gaveston demanded that the king dismiss one of Lancaster's retainers.

Lancaster was one of the Lords Ordainers who demanded the banishment of Gaveston and the establishment of a baronial oligarchy. His private army helped separate the king and Gaveston, and Lancaster was one of the "judges" who convicted Gaveston and saw him executed in 1312.

After the disaster at Bannockburn in 1314, Edward submitted to Lancaster, who in effect became ruler of England. He attempted to govern for the next four years, but could not keep order or prevent the Scots from raiding and retaking territory in the North. In 1318, his popularity with the barons declined, and he was persuaded "to accept a diminished authority".

== Death ==
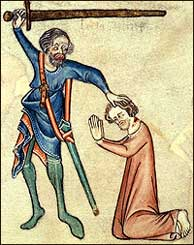
A medieval depiction of the execution of Thomas, Earl of Lancaster

The new leadership, eventually headed by Hugh le Despenser, 1st Earl of Winchester, and his son Hugh Despenser the Younger, proved no more popular with the baronage, and in 1321 Lancaster was again at the head of a rebellion. This time, he was defeated at the Battle of Boroughbridge on 16 March 1322 and taken prisoner.

Lancaster was tried by a tribunal consisting of, among others, the two Despensers; Edmund Fitzalan, 9th Earl of Arundel; and King Edward. Lancaster was not allowed to speak in his defence, nor was he allowed to have anyone speak for him. He was convicted of treason and sentenced to death. Because of their kinship and Lancaster's royal blood, the king commuted the sentence to beheading, as opposed to being hanged, drawn and beheaded, and Lancaster was executed on 22 March 1322 near Pontefract Castle.

Upon his death, his titles and estates were forfeited, and the Scots, whom Lancaster gained aid from in his rebellion, mainly to weaken the English in their war, seized the opportunity to take his inheritance in the Great Raid of 1322. In 1323, his younger brother Henry successfully petitioned to take possession of the earldom of Leicester, and in 1326 or 1327, Parliament posthumously reversed Thomas's conviction. Henry was further permitted to take possession of the earldoms of Lancaster, Derby, Salisbury and Lincoln.

Soon after Thomas's death, miracles were reported at his tomb at Pontefract, and he became venerated as a martyr and saint. In 1327, the Commons petitioned Edward III to ask for his canonisation, and popular veneration continued until the reformation.

In 1822, it was alleged that Thomas's remains had been discovered on Monday 25 March of that year, in a large stone coffin buried in a field in the parish of Ferry Fryston (precisely five hundred years after his execution and precisely one week before April Fools' Day). This story was syndicated in stereotype in the first week of April, credited to "the Leeds Mercury of Saturday last" (i.e. 30 March 1822); in the second week of April syndicated in a new stereotype without crediting the Mercury (and paired with an apparently true story about the February discovery in Capelle of a "fossil ship"); and then disappeared from the public eye.

In 1942, E. J. Rudsdale wrote that he had encountered a box of bones, labeled as Thomas's and as having been "removed from Pomfret Castle" in 1885, at Paskell's auctioneers in Colchester, Essex.

== Titles and lands ==
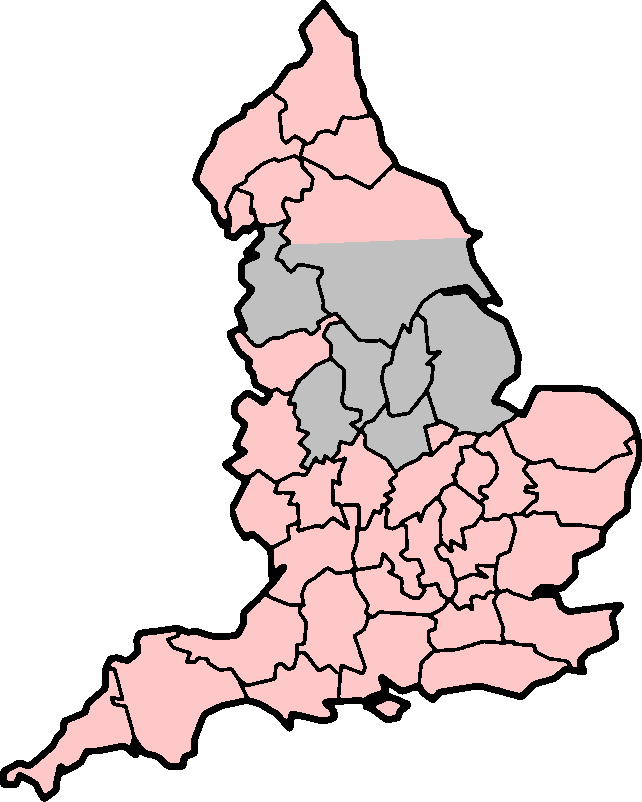
Thomas of Lancaster's main possessions (Maddicott)

Thomas inherited the earldoms of Lancaster, Leicester and the Ferrers earldom of Derby from his father. By his marriage to Alice de Lacy, Countess of Lincoln, daughter and heiress of Henry de Lacy, 3rd Earl of Lincoln, he became Earl of Lincoln, Earl of Salisbury, 11th Baron of Halton and 7th Lord of Bowland upon the death of his father-in-law in 1311. Master of five earldoms, he was one of England's wealthiest and most powerful men. Thomas was in possession of many key fortresses, including Clitheroe Castle, particularly in northern England. He was responsible for the extension of Pontefract Castle, and in 1313, he began the construction of Dunstanburgh Castle, a massive fortress in Northumberland.

== Arms ==
Inherited from his father, Thomas bore the arms of the kingdom, differenced by a label France of three points (that is to say, azure three fleur-de-lys or, each).

== Genealogical table ==
Thomas was closely related to the Capetian kings of France and the Plantagenet kings of England. His contemporaries commented, "as each parent was of royal stock, he was clearly of nobler descent than the other earls".

Henry III of England	Eleanor of Provence
Edward I of England	Henry I of Navarre	Blanche of Artois	Edmund Crouchback
Philip IV of France	Joan I of Navarre	Thomas of Lancaster	Henry of Lancaster
Edward II of England	Isabella of France	Louis X of France	Philip V of France	Charles IV of France
Edward III of England

== Footnotes ==
Thomas, 2nd Earl of Lancaster House of Plantagenet Born: c. 1278 Died: 22 March 1322
Honorary titles
Preceded by Edmund Crouchback	Lord High Steward; 1296–1322	Succeeded by Henry of Lancaster
Peerage of England
Preceded by Edmund Crouchback	Earl of Lancaster and Leicester; 1296–1322	Succeeded by Henry of Lancaster
