= Margaret de Quincy, Countess of Lincoln =

English noblewoman

Margaret de Quincy
- Suo Jure Countess of Lincoln Countess of Pembroke
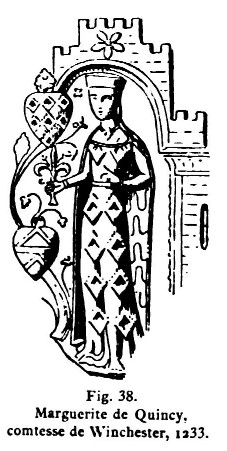
- Born: c. 1206; England
- Died: March 1266; Hampstead
- Buried: Church of The Hospitallers, Clerkenwell
- Noble family: de Quincy
- Spouses: John de Lacy, 2nd Earl of Lincoln; Walter Marshal, 5th Earl of Pembroke
- Issue: Maud de Lacy; Edmund de Lacy, Baron of Pontefract
- Father: Robert de Quincy
- Mother: Hawise of Chester; Countess of Lincoln suo jure

Margaret de Quincy, suo jure 2nd Countess of Lincoln (c. 1206 – March 1266) was a wealthy English noblewoman and heiress having inherited in her own right the Earldom of Lincoln and honours of Bolingbroke from her mother Hawise of Chester, received a dower from the estates of her first husband, and acquired a dower third from the extensive earldom of Pembroke following the death of her second husband, Walter Marshal, 5th Earl of Pembroke. Her first husband was John de Lacy, 2nd Earl of Lincoln, by whom she had two children. He was created 2nd Earl of Lincoln by right of his marriage to Margaret. Margaret has been described as "one of the two towering female figures of the mid-13th century".

== Family ==
Margaret was born in about 1206, the daughter and only child of Robert de Quincy and Hawise of Chester, who was the co-heiress of her uncle Ranulf de Blondeville, 6th Earl of Chester. Hawise became suo jure Countess of Chester in April 1231 when her brother resigned the title in her favour.

Margaret's paternal grandfather, Saer de Quincy, 1st Earl of Winchester was one of the 25 sureties of Magna Carta; as a result, he was excommunicated by the Church in December 1215. Two years later, her father died after having been accidentally poisoned through medicine prepared by a Cistercian monk.

== Life ==
On 23 November 1232, Margaret and her husband John de Lacy, Baron of Pontefract were formally invested by King Henry III as Countess and Earl of Lincoln. In April 1231, her maternal uncle Ranulf de Blondeville, 1st Earl of Lincoln had made an inter vivos gift, after receiving dispensation from the crown, of the Earldom of Lincoln to her mother, Hawise. Her uncle granted her mother the title by a formal charter under his seal, which was confirmed by King Henry III. Her mother was formally invested as suo jure 1st Countess of Lincoln on 27 October 1232, the day after her uncle's death. Likewise, her mother, Hawise of Chester, received permission from King Henry III to grant the Earldom of Lincoln jointly to Margaret and her husband John, and less than a month later, a second formal investiture took place, but this time for Margaret and her husband John de Lacy. Margaret became 2nd Countess of Lincoln suo jure (in her own right), and John de Lacy became 2nd Earl of Lincoln by right of his wife. (John de Lacy is mistakenly called the 1st Earl of Lincoln in many references.)

In 1238, Margaret and her husband paid King Henry the large sum of 5,000 pounds to obtain his agreement to the marriage of their daughter Maud to Richard de Clare, 6th Earl of Hertford, 2nd Earl of Gloucester.

On 22 July 1240, Margaret's first husband, John de Lacy, died. Although he was nominally succeeded by their only son Edmund de Lacy (c.1227–1258) for titles and lands that included Baron of Pontefract, Baron of Halton, and Constable of Chester, Margaret at first controlled the estates in lieu of her son who was still in his minority and being brought up at the court of Henry III and Eleanor of Provence. In 1243, Margaret inherited the manor of Grantchester on the death of her mother Hawise.

Edmund was allowed to succeed to his titles and estates at the age of 18. Edmund was also Margaret's heir to the Earldom of Lincoln and her other extensive estates that included a third of the Earldom of Pembroke that she had inherited from her second husband in 1248. Edmund was never able to become Earl of Lincoln, however, as he predeceased his mother by eight years.

As the widowed Countess of Lincoln suo jure, Margaret was brought into contact with some of the most important people in the county of Lincolnshire. Among these included Robert Grosseteste, Bishop of Lincoln, the most significant intellectual in England at the time, who recognised Margaret's position as Countess of Lincoln to be legitimate and important, and he viewed Margaret as both patron and peer. He dedicated Les Reules Seynt Robert, his treatise on estate and household management, to her.

Margaret died in 1266 and left her estates to her grandson, Henry de Lacy, Earl of Lincoln.

== Marriages and issue ==
Sometime before 21 June 1221, Margaret married as his second wife, her first husband John de Lacy of Pontefract. The purpose of the alliance was to bring the rich Lincoln and Bolingbroke inheritance of her mother to the de Lacy family. Although John's first marriage to Alice de l'Aigle had not produced issue, John and Margaret together had two children:

- Maud de Lacy (25 January 1223- 1287/10 March 1289), married in 1238 Richard de Clare, 6th Earl of Hertford, 2nd Earl of Gloucester, by whom she had seven children.
- Edmund de Lacy, Baron of Pontefract (died 2 June 1258), married in 1247 Alasia of Saluzzo, daughter of Manfredo III of Saluzzo, by whom he had three children, including Henry de Lacy, 3rd Earl of Lincoln.

Margaret married secondly on 6 January 1242, Walter Marshal, the fifth Earl of Pembroke, Lord of Striguil, Lord of Leinster, Earl Marshal of England, one of the ten children of William Marshal, 1st Earl of Pembroke and Isabel de Clare, 4th Countess of Pembroke. This marriage, like those of his four brothers, did not produce any children; therefore, when he died at Goodrich Castle on 24 November 1245, Margaret inherited a third of the Earldom of Pembroke as well as the properties and lordship of Kildare.

Margaret's dower third outweighed any of the individual holdings of the 13 different co-heirs of the five Marshal sisters which meant she would end up controlling more of the earldom of Pembroke and lordship of Leinster than any of the other co-heirs; this brought her into direct conflict with her own daughter, Maud, whose husband was by virtue of his mother Isabel Marshal one of the co-heirs of the Pembroke earldom. As a result of her quarrels with her daughter, Margaret preferred her grandson Henry de Lacy, who would become the third Earl of Lincoln on reaching majority (21) in 1272. She and her Italian daughter-in-law, Alasia of Saluzzo, shared in the wardship of Henry, who was Margaret's heir, and the relationship between the two women appears to have been cordial.

== Death and legacy ==
Margaret was a careful overseer of her property and tenants, and gracious in her dealings with her son's children, neighbours and tenants. She received two papal dispensations in 1251, the first to erect a portable altar; the other so that she could hear mass in the Cistercian monastery. Margaret died in March 1266 at Hampstead. Her death was recorded in the Annals of Worcester and in the Annals of Winchester. She was buried in The Order of St. John Cemetery, Farringdon, London.

Margaret was described as "one of the two towering female figures of the mid-13th century"; the other being Ela, Countess of Salisbury.

== Notes ==
Peerage of England
Preceded by Hawise of Chester; Countess of Lincoln suo jure	from 1232 to 1240 together with her spouse John de Lacy, 2nd Earl of Lincoln jure uxoris Countess of Lincoln suo jure 1232–c.1266	Succeeded by Henry de Lacy; 3rd Earl of Lincoln
