= Edmund de Lacy, Baron of Pontefract =

Baron of Pontefract

Edmund de Lacy, Earl of Lincoln (c. 1230–1258) was an important landholder in Northern England, with a strategic manor at Stanbury which was important for east–west communication, and as Lord of the Honour of Pontefract he possessed Pontefract Castle.

== Origins ==
Edmund was the son and heir of John de Lacy, jure uxoris Earl of Lincoln (c. 1192–1240) 8th Baron of Halton, 8th Hereditary Constable of Chester, and feudal baron of Pontefract. His father was one of the 25 barons who forced John, King of England to sign Magna Carta in 1215. Edmund's mother was Margaret de Quincy, suo jure Countess of Lincoln (c.1206–1266).

== Earl of Lincoln ==
There is doubt as to whether Edmund de Lacy became Earl of Lincoln, as he predeceased his mother, but not his father. The Complete Peerage gives him as the 3rd Earl, but notes that "he does not appear to have been formally invested with the earldom, presumably because his mother outlived him". Although he signed as Constable of Chester on documents, contemporaries would refer to him as Earl of Lincoln and he is known to have held the estates of the earldom.

== Tournament ==
Somewhere between 1248 and his death in 1258 he was the leader of a group of twenty knights headed for a tournament between Tickhill Castle and Blyth. A knight who gave him hospitality is known to have written a letter to his baillif;

A knight to his bailiff, greetings. You will have heard that on the morrow of the Purification [February 3] we are to arrive with all our household at the estate that we have committed to your faithful keeping. We shall be coming to you with Lord E[dmund] de Lacy, constable of Chester, who will be traveling through those parts with twenty knights to the tournament at Blyth. Therefore, I order you to provide for the needs of the said constable and myself in all matters, so that I may have cause to speak well of your service.

== Career ==
When his father died in 1240 he inherited his father's titles and thus became 9th Baron of Halton, 9th Constable of Chester, feudal baron of Pontefract, Lord of Bowland, etc. He also became Earl of Lincoln, even though his mother, suo jure Countess was still alive. As he was a minor he became a ward of the king, which wardship was later acquired by his mother. Normally his inheritance would have been held in wardship until he reached the age of majority (21). However, Edmund was allowed to succeed his father at only 18 years of age. He was brought up at the royal court of King Henry III and Eleanor of Provence.

== Marriage and issue ==
Having been brought up at the royal court of Henry III and Eleanor of Provence, in May 1247 at Woodstock Palace he made a 'Savoyard' marriage to Alésia of Saluzzo (Alice de Saluces), who had been brought to England by Peter II, Count of Savoy Eleanor's uncle. She was the daughter of Manfred III of Saluzzo in Piedmont, and sister of Thomas I of Saluzzo. By his wife he had issue including:

- Henry de Lacy, 3rd Earl of Lincoln.

== Death and burial ==
He died 2 June 1258 and was buried at Stanlow Abbey founded by his paternal grandfather John fitz Richard (died 1190), 6th Baron of Halton, 6th Hereditary Constable of Chester.

== Ancestry ==
Ancestors of Edmund de Lacy, Baron of Pontefract

Roger de Lacy, Baron of Pontefract
John de Lacy, Earl of Lincoln
Maud or Matilda de Clere
Edmund de Lacy, Baron of Pontefract
Saer de Quincy, 1st Earl of Winchester
Robert de Quincy
Matilda of St Liz
Margaret de Quincy, Countess of Lincoln
Hugh de Kevelioc, 5th Earl of Chester
Hawise of Chester, 1st Countess of Lincoln suo jure
Bertrade de Montfort of Evreux

== Sources ==
- Carlin, Martha; Crouch, David (2013). Lost Letters of Medieval Life: English Society, 1200-1250. University of Pennsylvania Press. p. 222. ISBN 978-0-8122-4459-5.
- Cox, Eugene L. (1974). The Eagle of Savoy: The House of Savoy in the Thirteenth Century. Princeton University Press.
- Fritze, Ronald H.; Robison, William Baxter, eds. (2002). "Henry Lacy 3rd Earl of Lincoln". Historical Dictionary of Late Medieval England, 1272–1485. Greenwood Press.
- Gee, Loveday Lewes (2002). Women, Art and Patronage from Henry III to Edward III: 1216-1377. Boydell Press.

Peerage of England
Preceded by John de Lacy	Baron of Pontefract c.1248–1258	Succeeded by Henry de Lacy
