= Walter Marshal, 5th Earl of Pembroke =

Anglo-Norman nobleman in Wales (1196–1245)

Walter Marshal
- 5th Earl of Pembroke
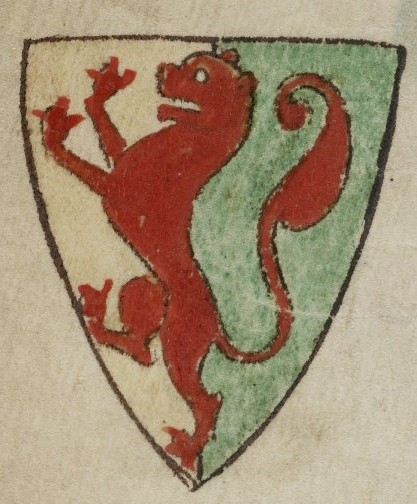
- Arms of Marshal by Matthew Paris
- Born: 1199; Leinster
- Died: 27 November 1245 (aged 45–46); Goodrich Castle
- Noble family: Marshal of Hamstead
- Spouse: Margaret de Quincy, Countess of Lincoln
- Father: William Marshal, 1st Earl of Pembroke
- Mother: Isabel de Clare, 4th Countess of Pembroke

Walter Marshal, 5th Earl of Pembroke (1199 – 27 November 1245) was the fourth son of William Marshal, 1st Earl of Pembroke and Countess Isabel, the daughter of Richard de Clare. He was a member of the Marshal Family.

== Early life ==
Walter was born in 1199 (or early in 1200) in Leinster during his father's long period of exile in Ireland between 1208 and 1213. He was the fourth son and one of the ten children of William Marshal, 1st Earl of Pembroke, and his wife Isabel, the heir of Richard de Clare. He had been preceded in the earldom by three of his older brothers, who had each died young without legitimate children. His father's biographer talks of him in 1226 as not yet knighted though a very promising youth. His date of birth of 1209 two years after his brother Gilbert can be calculated from his coming of age in the summer of 1231. He was left the small barony of Goodrich Castle in Herefordshire in his father's last will and testament along with the large Marshal manors of Bere Regis and Sturminster Marshall in Dorset. As a child he was fostered for some time into the household of Richard Siward, the prominent banneret knight of Walter's eldest brother William.

Walter Marshal made his career as a young man as a knight in the households of his elder brothers Earl Richard and Earl Gilbert. He was at the battle of the Curragh of Kildare on 1 April 1234 where he fought alongside his brother Richard, but evaded capture in his defeat. In 1240 Walter was delegated command of his brother Gilbert's campaign in west Wales, and was responsible for ending Welsh power in Pembrokeshire and Ceredigion. He was in the tournament retinue of his brother Gilbert at Ware on 27 June 1241 where Gilbert died of his injuries.

== Earl of Pembroke ==
As Gilbert had just one illegitimate daughter Isabel by an unknown mistress, Walter became the next earl of Pembroke. His succession was fraught. King Henry III was angered at Walter for having disobeyed royal orders, which had forbidden the tournament at Ware. Knowing this, Walter fled to Wales immediately after his brother's funeral and put his castles in defence, so that royal custodians could not take them over. The king though infuriated did not take this as an act of rebellion. The two met at a conference in mid-July 1241 at Llanthony Priory on the borders of Wales. The king is said to have vented a lot of pent-up anger on the Marshal family, but relented and allowed Walter's officers to legally occupy the castles. After a period of penance for Walter at the court, the king finally delivered the earldom to him on 28 October 1241 after his performance of homage. Walter had a confirmation of the office of marshal of England a week later. On 6 January 1242 Walter married the wealthy widow Margaret de Quincy, Countess of Lincoln. Margaret brought him her maternal inheritance of the honour of Bolingbroke in Lincolnshire in 1243 after the death of her mother, Hawise of Chester. The marriage was childless however.

Earl Walter made a point of dutifully following the royal court for several months after his rehabilitation, and promptly answered the summons for the king's campaign in Gascony in the summer of 1242, supplying ships and knights. On his return from Bordeaux in October with his nephew, Earl Richard of Gloucester and Earl Richard of Cornwall, his ships were caught in an Atlantic gale, and forced to take refuge on the Scilly Isles. In 1244 Walter was deployed to contain the military threat of Prince Dafydd ap Llywelyn of Wales to the southern March. On 6 June 1244 at Westminster Walter made a final settlement of the state of mortal enmity that had existed between the Marshals and Maurice Fitz Gerald as a result of Maurice's involvement with the death of Earl Richard Marshal in 1234.

== Death ==
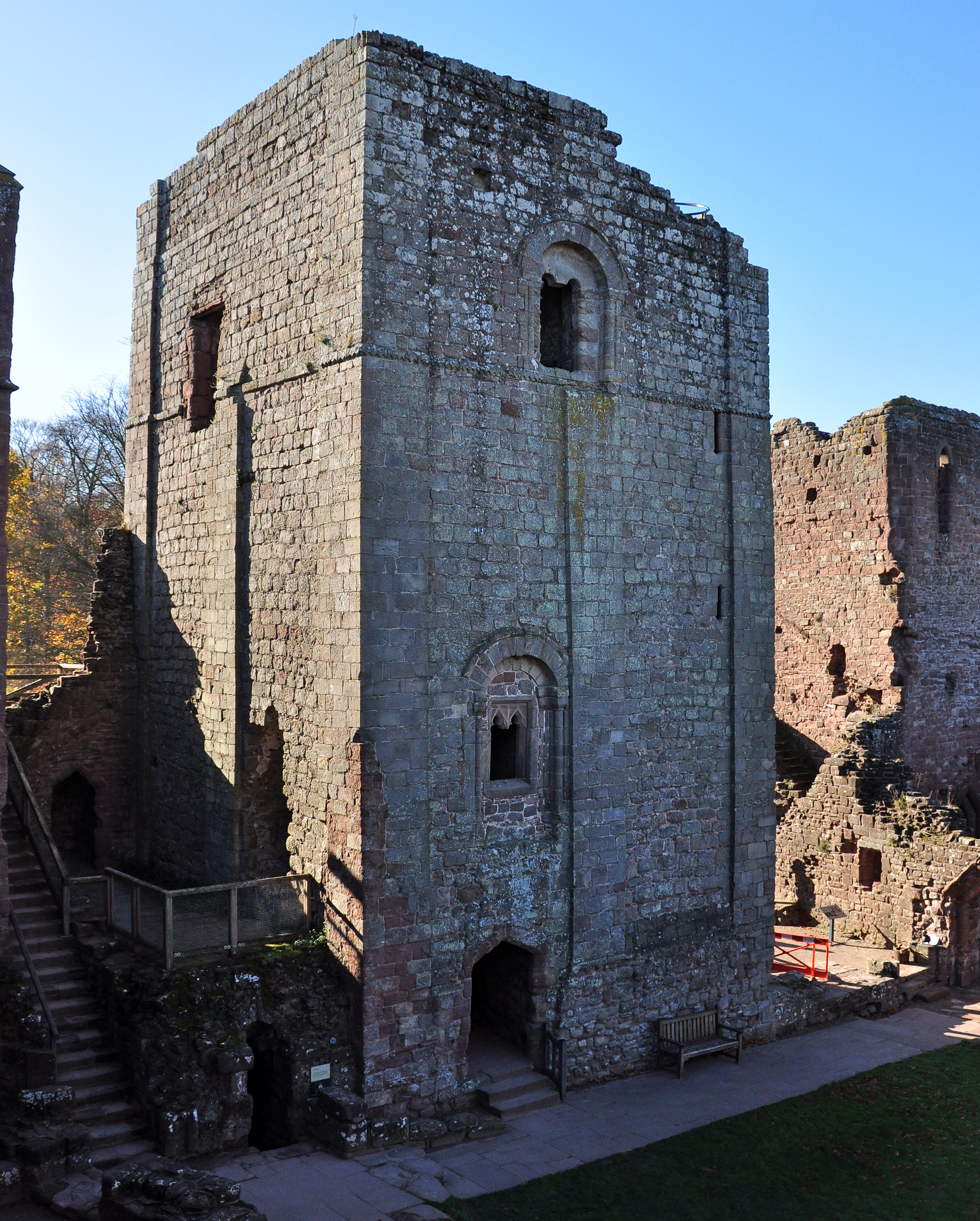
Keep of Goodrich Castle, where Walter died

Walter crossed over to Leinster at the end of 1244 and remained there till the early summer of 1245 settling his Irish affairs. After landing at Haverfordwest he moved to his lands in Gwent and it appears had fallen seriously ill by July. He died after a long illness on 27 November 1245 at Goodrich Castle. He was buried near his mother in the choir of Tintern Abbey. As he was childless the earldom passed to his younger surviving brother, Ansel. Walter's widow, Margaret received a full dower third from the Pembroke earldom and lordships, including the county of Kildare in Ireland. Her dower was larger than the individual holdings of the 13 eventual co-heirs of the Marshal estate after Ansel's subsequent death.

== Sources ==
- Acts and Letters of the Marshal Family 1156-1248: Earls of Pembroke and Marshals of England, ed. David Crouch, Camden Society 5th series, 47 (Cambridge: CUP, 2015).
- Cokayne, George E. (1945), The New Complete Peerage, vol. 10, St. Catherine Press Limited
- D. Crouch, 'Earl Gilbert Marshal and his mortal enemies,' Historical Research, 87 (2014), 393–403.
- R.F. Walker, 'The Earls of Pembroke, 1138-1389' in, Pembrokeshire County History ii, Medieval Pembrokeshire, ed. R.F. Walker (Haverfordwest, 2002).
- Louise Wilkinson, 'Pawn and political player: observations on the life of a thirteenth-century countess,' Historical Research, 73 (2000), 105-23

Political offices
Preceded by Gilbert Marshal	Earl Marshal; 1242–1245	Succeeded by Anselm Marshal
Peerage of England
Preceded by Gilbert Marshal	Earl of Pembroke; 1242–1245	Succeeded by Anselm Marshal
