= Richard de Clare =

Richard de Clare may refer to:

- Richard fitz Gilbert (1030–1091), lord of Clare and of Tonbridge, ancestor of the Clare family
- Richard Fitz Gilbert de Clare (died 1136), a.k.a. Richard de Clare, 1st Earl of Hertford, Anglo-Norman lord
- Richard de Clare, 2nd Earl of Pembroke (1130–1176), Anglo-Norman lord known as "Strongbow"
- Richard de Clare, 3rd Earl of Hertford (1153–1217), known as Earl of Clare, led in negotiations for Magna Carta
- Richard de Clare, 5th Earl of Hertford (1222–1262), also 2nd Earl of Gloucester
- Richard de Clare, Steward of Forest of Essex (1278–1318), killed at the Battle of Dysert O'Dea in Ireland

== See also ==
- de Clare
