= Shouldham Priory =

Priory in Norfolk, England

- Location within Norfolk

Religion
- Affiliation: Christianity
- Sect: Gilbertine Order

Location
- Country: England
- Coordinates: 52°39′27.04″N 0°28′59.62″E grid reference TF 68054 09540

Architecture
- Founder: Geoffrey Fitz Peter, 1st Earl of Essex
- Established: c. 1190
- Demolished: c. 1831
- Scheduled monument
- Designated: 23 October 1970
- Reference no.: 1010572

Shouldham Priory was a priory in the village of Shouldham, Norfolk, England. It was founded about 1190, and was surrendered in 1538 during the Dissolution of the Monasteries.

== History ==
The priory, dedicated to the Holy Cross and the Blessed Virgin, was founded by Geoffrey Fitz Peter, 1st Earl of Essex about 1190; it was a double house, for canons and nuns of the Gilbertine Order. It was one of the last of twelve double houses of the Gilbertine Order, later communities being for men only.

On the foundation of the priory, Geoffrey Fitz Peter removed the body of his first wife Beatrice from Chicksands Priory to this priory. He died in 1212, and was buried by his first wife.

The original endowment was the founder's manor of Shouldham, the churches of All Saints and St Margaret in Shouldham, and the churches of Carbaysthorp, Stoke Ferry, and Wereham. He later bestowed on the priory twelve shops in London. In 1291 the priory held property in 26 parishes in Norfolk and the shops in London, and its annual income was £207.

The house was surrendered, during the Dissolution of the Monasteries, in 1538. The document was signed by members of the priory: Robert Swift, prior, Richard Foster, sub-prior, and eight other canons; Elizabeth Fincham, prioress, Joan Plomstede, sub-prioress, and five other nuns. They afterwards received pensions. The house belonged to the Crown until 1553, when it was sold to Thomas Mildmay. It later passed to Sir John Hare.

== Description ==
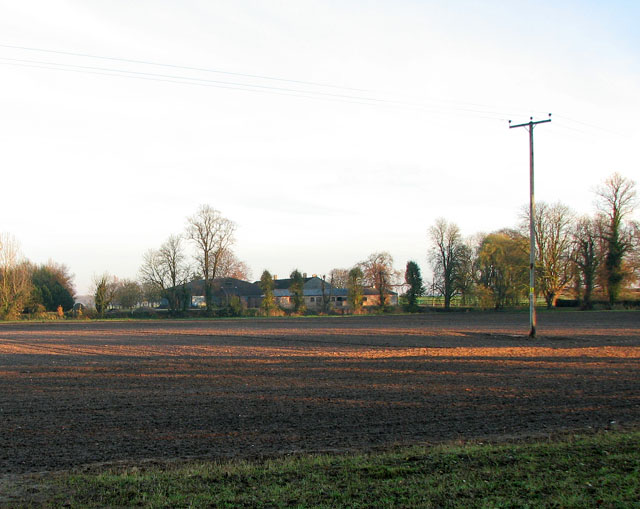
Abbey Farm, Shouldham, on the site of the priory

The ruins of the priory were demolished about 1831. In and around the area of the present Abbey Farm, there are buried remains of the priory church, earthworks showing remains of buildings probably associated with the priory, and traces of fishponds, channels and sluices; these are a scheduled monument.

Cropmarks east of the farmhouse show locations and dimensions of particular buildings of the priory. There is a scatter of building materials on the surface of the field.

There was some excavation of the monastic cemetery in 1954, when the remains of about 22 individuals, male and female, were uncovered. A medieval tile kiln, probably associated with the priory, was excavated in 1969–70.

== Burials at this priory ==
- William FitzGeoffrey de Mandeville, 3rd Earl of Essex
- Geoffrey Fitz Peter, 1st Earl of Essex
- Aveline de Clare, Countess of Essex
- Robert de Montalt (1270/74 -1329), Steward of Chester
