= Aveline Fitz Peter, Countess of Essex =

English noblewoman (c. 1178–1225)

Aveline de Clare, Countess of Essex
- Born: c. 1178
- Died: 1225 (aged 46–47)
- Spouse(s): William de Munchensy (d. 1204) Geoffrey fitz Peter (m. 1205; died 1213)
- Children: 6, including John
- Father: Roger de Clare
- Relatives: Richard de Clare (brother); Richard de Clare (grandfather)

Aveline de Clare, Countess of Essex (c. 1178 – 1225) was an English noble.

== Biography ==
Aveline was a daughter of Roger de Clare, 2nd Earl of Hertford, and his wife, Matilda de St. Hilaire. Aveline married twice. Her first husband, William de Munchensy, died in 1204. She was remarried by 29 May 1205, to Geoffrey fitz Peter, Earl of Essex, as his second wife. She was widowed a second time on 14 October 1213.

King John granted the royal right over Aveline's remarriage to her step-brother, William, Earl of Arundel, along with the guardianship of her children by William de Montchesney/Munchanesy, on 7 May 1204. Soon after her second marriage, she paid the crown for the wardship of John de Wahulle and custody of his land.

In her second widowhood, Aveline made gifts to Holy Trinity, London, for the soul of Geoffrey FitzPeter, part of whose body was buried there. She was buried in Shouldham Priory, founded by Geoffrey FitzPeter in 1198, alongside the rest of her husband's body.

== Children ==
With her first husband, William de Munchensy, Aveline had:

- William died without heirs before 1213
- Warin (b. 1192, d. July 1255); inherited Dec. 1213
- Alice, married (1) John de Wahulle, (2) William de Breauté

With her second husband, Geoffrey FitzPeter, Aveline had:

- John Fitzgeoffrey (b. 1205 Shere, Surrey, England d. 23 November 1258), married Isabel Bigod.
- Hawise
- Cecily
