= Gilbert de Clare =

Gilbert de Clare may refer to:

- Gilbert Fitz Richard known also as Gilbert de Clare (died 1117), lord of Clare, Tonbridge and Ceredigion
- Gilbert de Clare, 1st Earl of Pembroke (1100–1148)
- Gilbert de Clare, 1st Earl of Hertford (1115–1153)
- Gilbert de Clare, 4th Earl of Hertford and 5th Earl of Gloucester (1180–1230)
- Gilbert de Clare, 6th Earl of Hertford and 7th Earl of Gloucester (1243–1295)
- Gilbert de Clare, 7th Earl of Hertford and 8th Earl of Gloucester (1291–1314)
