= De Clare =

Anglo-Norman noble family

House of Clare de Clare
- Noble family
- Parent house: Normandy
- Country: England; Gloucestershire; Hertfordshire; Kent; Suffolk; Wales; Glamorgan; Pembrokeshire; Ireland; Leinster
- Founder: Richard fitz Gilbert
- Titles: Various
- Styles: Earls, Barons, and Knights
- Estates: Various Earldoms, Baronies and over 190 Manorial Lordships

The House of Clare was a prominent Anglo-Norman noble family that ruled the Earldoms of Pembroke, Hertford and Gloucester in England and Wales throughout its history, playing a prominent role in the Norman invasion of Ireland.

They were descended from Richard Fitz Gilbert, Lord of Clare (1035–1090), a kinsman of William the Conqueror who accompanied him into England during the Norman conquest of England. His great-grandfather was Richard I of Normandy who was the son of William Longsword and the grandson of the Viking Rollo. As a reward for his service, Richard was given lands in Suffolk centred on the village of Clare. As a result, Richard and his descendants carried the name of 'de Clare' or 'of Clare'.

The de Clares ranked among the greatest baronial houses of the early Middle Ages and were the proprietors of the monumental Caerphilly Castle, Pembroke Castle, Castell Coch, and over 190 manors in England.

== Origins ==
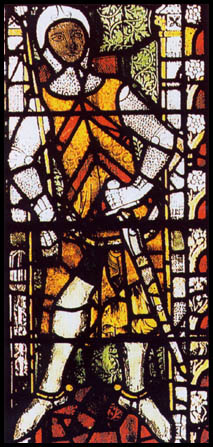
Stained glass window in Tewkesbury Abbey depicting Lord Gilbert de Clare.

The Clare family derived in the male line from Gilbert, Count of Brionne, whose father Geoffrey, Count of Eu was an illegitimate son of Richard I, Duke of Normandy by an unknown mistress. Gilbert de Brionne was one of the guardians of William II, who became Duke of Normandy as a child in 1035. When Gilbert was assassinated in 1039 or 1040, his young sons Baldwin and Richard fitz Gilbert fled with their guardians to Baldwin V, Count of Flanders; they returned to Normandy when William married Baldwin's daughter in 1053, and William took them into high favour. After the conquest of England, Richard fitz Gilbert received extensive estates, notably including Clare and Tonbridge. From his holding the former, the family he founded are usually referred to by historians as 'de Clare' (of Clare)." Historical sources are vague and sometimes contradictory about when the name Clare came into common usage, but Richard fitz Gilbert (of Tonbridge) is once referred to as Richard of Clare in the Suffolk return of the Domesday Survey. His brother Baldwin de Meules was left in charge of Exeter on its submission (1068) and made sheriff of Devonshire. Large estates in Devonshire and Somersetshire are entered to him in Domesday as "Baldwin of Exeter" or "Baldwin the Sheriff".

== Earldoms ==
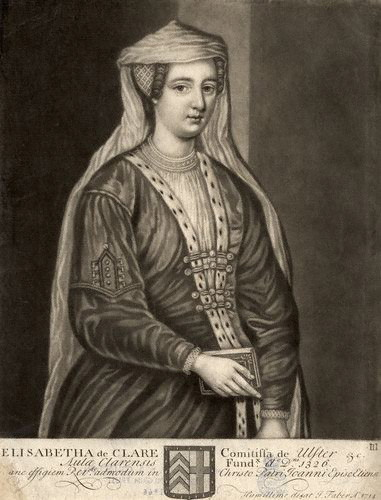
Elizabeth de Clare, 11th Lady of Clare, founder of Clare College, Cambridge

On his death, Richard's English estates passed to his son Gilbert Fitz Richard de Clare (1055–1117), while a younger son, Robert Fitz Richard, would give rise to a lineage that became Barons FitzWalter, as well as having younger branches that took the surnames of Daventry and Fawsley. A younger son of Gilbert fitz Richard, also named Gilbert, establishing himself in Wales, acquired the Earldom of Pembroke in 1138 and the Lordship of Striguil. Earl Gilbert's nephew of the senior line, the son of his older brother, Richard Fitz Gilbert de Clare (1090–1136), would likewise be made an Earl. Gilbert Fitz Richard (d. 1152) was named Earl of Hertford, perhaps in 1138 but at least by 1141, and subsequently, the family would sometimes use the style of Earls of Clare. The first Earl of Hertford died without issue and was succeeded by his brother, Roger de Clare, 2nd Earl of Hertford, from whom the later Earls of Hertford descended.

The son of Gilbert Fitz Gilbert de Clare, Earl of Pembroke, was Richard de Clare, 2nd Earl of Pembroke (died 1176), known as Strongbow, a leader of the Norman invasion of Ireland. His father was also nicknamed Strongbow, so it's possible he inherited the nickname from him.

Richard's only son died while still a minor, and Strongbow's many Irish and Welsh possessions passed with his daughter Isabel, to her husband, William Marshal. Some of these lands would be brought back into the family via the marriage of one of the coheiresses of Isabel de Clare and William Marshal, Isabel Marshal, to her distant cousin, Gilbert de Clare, 4th Earl of Hertford (died 1230). He also inherited from his mother the estates of his maternal grandfather, William Fitz Robert, 2nd Earl of Gloucester (died 1183), including the earldom and honour of Gloucester and the lordship of Glamorgan.

The family continued to hold both Earldoms until the early 14th century, when Gilbert de Clare, 8th Earl of Gloucester died without issue and the Earldoms became extinct, while his lands were divided among several sisters. Richard de Clare, a member of a junior line that had become lords of Thomond, in Ireland, would be summoned to Parliament in 1309 and hence is held to have been made Lord Clare. But, the death of his infant son in 1321, shortly after his own death, brought an end to the last of the lines typically called de Clare, though the male line persisted at least a century later in the Barons FitzWalter.

== Coat of arms ==
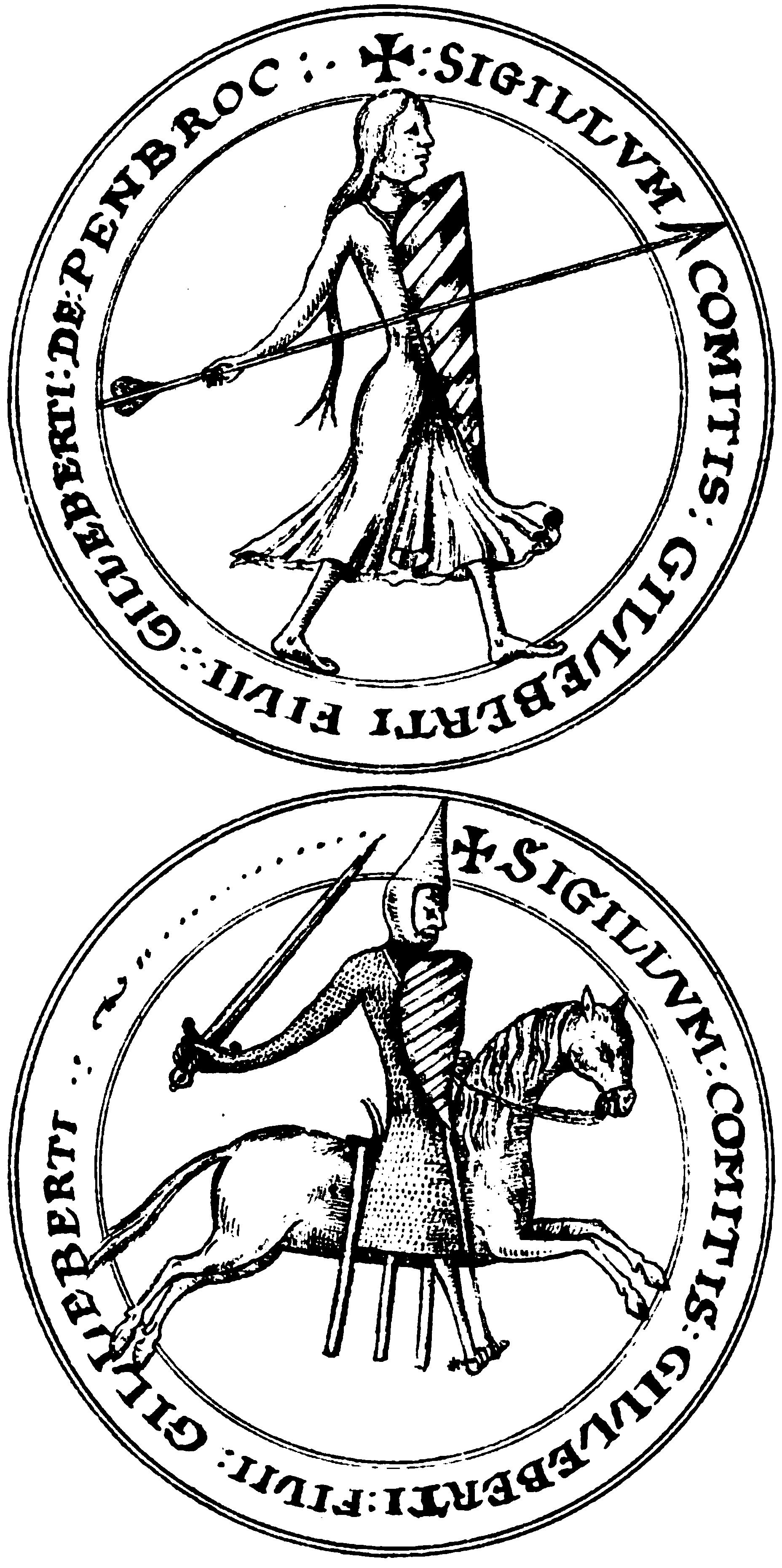
Seal of Gilbert Fitz Gilbert, Earl of Pembroke

The early Clares appear to have used a coat of arms that was chevronny, as seen in the seals of Gilbert, 1st Earl of Pembroke, and of his niece, Rohese, Countess of Lincoln. Richard 'Strongbow', 2nd Earl of Pembroke, would simplify this to a coat with three chevronels, matching the three red chevrons on a gold background that would be the arms of the Clare Earls of Hertford.

== Family tree ==
Tree of Clare

Richard I Duke of Normandy d. 996
Geoffrey; Count of Eu d. 1015
House of Clare	Gilbert; Count of Brionne and Eu d. 1040
Richard fitz Gilbert; Lord of Bienfaite, Orbec, Clare and Tonbridge, joint Chief Justiciar of England d. c. 1090	Baldwin FitzGilbert; Lord of Sap and Meules, baron of Okehampton; Sheriff of Devon d. 1090
Robert fitz Baldwin	William fitz Baldwin baron of Okehampton; Sheriff of Devon fl. 1096	Richard fitz Baldwin baron of Okehampton; Sheriff of Devon d. 1137	Adelise fitz Baldwin eventual heiress	[? Matilda] fitz Baldwin m. William fitzWimund m. Ranulf Avenel
Roger fitz Gilbert de Clare; Lord of Bienfaite and Orbec d. 1131	Gilbert fitz Richard de Clare; Lord of Clare; Tonbridge and Cardigan d. 1117	Walter fitz Richard de Clare; Lord of Netherwent d. c. 1138	Richard fitz Richard de Clare; Abbot of Ely	Robert fitz Richard; Lord of Little, Dunmow (Essex) d. 1136
Richard fitz Gilbert de Clare; Lord of Tunbridge and Cardigan d. 1136	Gilbert fitz Gilbert de Clare; Earl of Pembroke d. 1148/1149	Baldwin fitz Gilbert de Clare; Lord of Bourne d. 1154/1166	Barons FitzWalter male line extinct 1431	Daventry of Daventry male line extinct 1381	Fawlsey of Fawlsey male line extinct 1392
Gilbert fitz Richard de Clare; Earl of Hertford d. 1152	Roger fitz Richard de Clare; Earl of Hertford d. 1173	Rohaise de Clare m. Gilbert de Gant; Earl of Lincoln	Alice de Clare m. Cadwaladr ap Gruffydd; Prince of Gwynedd	Lucy de Clare m. Baldwin de Redvers; Earl of Devon	Richard fitz Gilbert de Clare; Strongbow; Earl of Pembroke d. 1176
Richard de Clare; Earl of Hertford d. 1217	Aveline de Clare d. 1164 m. Geoffrey fitz Piers; Earl of Essex	Isabel de Clare m. William Marshal; Earl of Pembroke d. 1220	Gilbert de Clare of Striguil; Earl of Pembroke d. 1185
Mathilde de Clare m. Rhys Gryg; Prince of Deheubarth d. 1234	Gilbert de Clare; Earl of Hertford and Gloucester d. 1230	Isabel Marshal coheiress of her mother	other coheiresses
Isabel de Clare d. 1264	Richard de Clare; Earl of Hertford and Gloucester d. 1262
Bruce; Kings of Scotland	Gilbert de Clare the Red Earl; Earl of Hertford and Gloucester, Guardian of England d. 1295	Bogo de Clare; Clergyman d. 1294	Thomas de Clare; Lord of Thomond, Chancellor of Ireland d. 1287
Gilbert de Clare; Earl of Hertford and Gloucester d. 1314	Eleanor de Clare m. Hugh Baron Despenser m. William de la Zouche	Margaret de Clare m. Piers Gaveston, Earl of Cornwall m. Hugh de Audley, Earl of Gloucester	Elizabeth de Clare m. John de Burgh m. Theobald de Verdun m. Roger, Baron d'Amory	Gilbert de Clare; Lord of Thomond d. 1308	Richard de Clare; Lord Clare, Lord of Thomond d. 1318	Maud de Clare m. Robert Baron Clifford m. Robert Baron Welles	Margaret de Clare m. Gilbert de Umfraville m. Bartholomew Baron Badlesmere
(coheiresses)	Thomas de Clare d. 1321	(coheiresses)

== Bibliography ==
- Michael Altschul, A Baronial Family in Medieval England: The Clares, 1217–1314, The Johns Hopkins Press, Baltimore, 1965. See online summary.
- Paul R. Davis, "Three Chevrons Red: The Clares: a Marcher Dynasty in Wales, England and Ireland", Logaston Press; UK ed. edition (2013)
- J. C. Ward, "Fashions in monastic endowment: the foundations of the Clare family, 1066–1314", Journal of Ecclesiastical History, vol. 32.4 (1981), p. 427–451.
- J. C. Ward, "Royal service and reward: the Clare family and the crown, 1066–1154", Anglo-Norman Studies, vol. 11 (1988), p. 261–278.
