= Gilbert de Clare, 1st Earl of Pembroke =

Anglo-Norman nobleman (c. 1100–1148)

Gilbert fitz Gilbert de Clare
- Earl of Pembroke
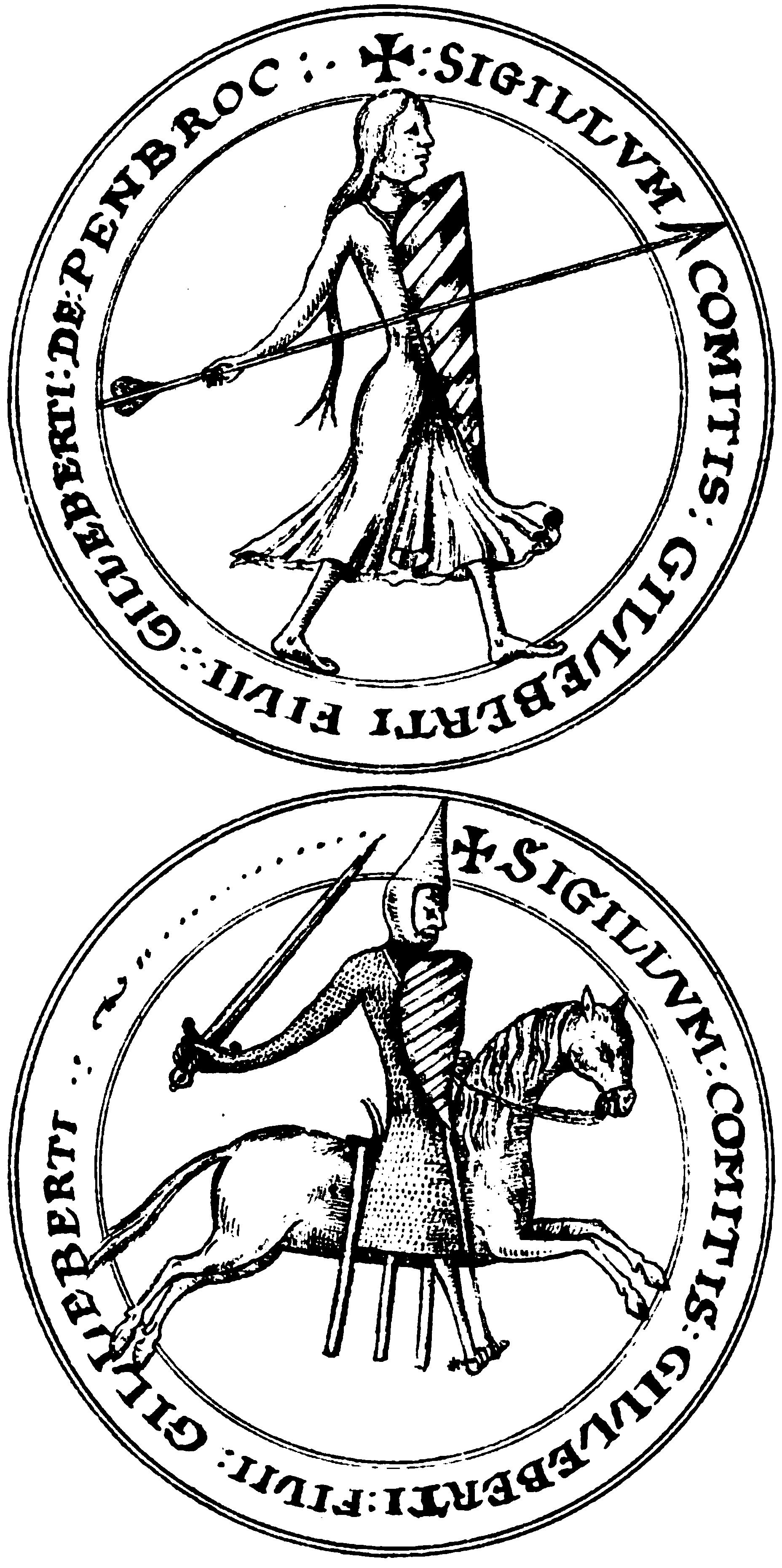
- Seal of Gilbert fitz Gilbert, from Lansdowne MS. 203
- Born: c. 1100; Tonbridge
- Died: 6 January 1148
- Noble family: de Clare
- Spouse: Isabel de Beaumont
- Issue: Richard de Clare; Basilia de Clare; Unknown daughter
- Father: Gilbert Fitz Richard
- Mother: Alice de Claremont

Gilbert Fitz Gilbert de Clare (c. 1100 – 6 January 1148), was created Earl of Pembroke in 1138. (Note: He was called "Strongbow" but his son Richard is much more readily associated with that nickname.)

== Life ==
Born at Tonbridge, Gilbert de Clare was the second son of Gilbert Fitz Richard de Clare and Alice de Claremont. He inherited no substantial land or wealth as his older brother inherited the family properties but was part of the powerful House of de Clare.

In 1136, Gilbert led an expedition against Exmes and burned parts of the town, including the church of Notre Dame, but was interrupted by the forces of William III, Count of Ponthieu, and escaped the resulting melee only after suffering heavy losses.

Gilbert became an English Baron, inheriting the estates of his paternal uncles, Roger and Walter, which included the baronies and castles of Bienfaite and Orbec in Normandy, and in the Welsh March the castle of Striguil (later Chepstow) and the lordship of Nether Gwent.

Welsh forces under Owain Gwynedd had severely defeated Norman settlers in 1136 near Cardigan Norman influence never fully recovered in West Wales, although the disruption following Gruffydd ap Rhys's death in 1137 allowed the Normans to partially recover their position and in 1138 Pembrokeshire became a county palatine with King Stephen creating him Earl of Pembroke. At the same time Stephen gave him the rape and castle of Pevensey in Sussex.

Gilbert fought on Stephen's side at the Battle of Lincoln on 2 February 1141, but after Stephen's defeat he was among those who rallied to Empress Matilda when she recovered London in June, although he was at Canterbury when Stephen was recrowned late in 1141. He then joined Geoffrey's plot against Stephen, but when that conspiracy collapsed, he again adhered to Stephen, being with him at the siege of Oxford late in 1142. In 1147, he rebelled when Stephen refused to give him the castles surrendered by his nephew Gilbert, 1st Earl of Hertford, whereupon the King marched to his nearest castle and nearly captured him. However, the Earl appears to have made his peace with Stephen before his death the following year.

== Family ==
Gilbert married Isabel de Beaumont, before 1130, daughter of Sir Robert de Beaumont, the first Earl of Leicester, Count of Meulan, and Elizabeth de Vermandois. Isabel had previously been the mistress of King Henry I of England.

Gilbert and Isabel had:

- Richard de Clare, 2nd Earl of Pembroke (Note: William Dugdale had credited Gilbert, the first Earl of Pembroke, with a second son who was named Baldwin fitz Gilbert; but Round showed that this Baldwin was really his brother.)
- Basilia de Clare, who married (1) Raymond FitzGerald (Raymond le Gros) and (2) Geoffrey FitzRobert.
- a daughter who married William Bloet.

== Explanatory notes ==
Peerage of England
New creation	Earl of Pembroke; 1138–1148	Succeeded by Richard de Clare
