= Miranda Seymour =

English critic, novelist and biographer (born 1948)

- Born: 8 August 1948 (age 78)
- Education: Bedford College, London
- Occupations: Writer, historian, biographer
- Spouse(s): Andrew Sinclair; Anthony Gottlieb; Ted Lynch
- Relatives: George FitzRoy Seymour (father); Richard Sturgis Seymour (grandfather)
- Writing career
- Period: 1975–present
- Subjects: Women writers, 20th century history
- Notable works: In My Father's House, I Used to Live Here Once, Chaplin's Girl, The Bugatti Queen
- Notable awards: Pen Ackerley Award
- Website: www.mirandaseymour.com

Miranda Jane Seymour (born 8 August 1948) is an English literary critic, novelist and biographer of Robert Graves, Mary Shelley, Ada Lovelace and Jean Rhys among others. She was formerly married to Andrew Sinclair, and Anthony Gottlieb and is now married to Ted Lynch.Her son, Merlin Sinclair, is also a writer (The Cardinal's Man).

== Early life and education ==
Miranda is the daughter of George FitzRoy Seymour (from a cadet branch of Marquess of Hertford and Duke of Somerset) and Rosemary Nest Scott-Ellis (a daughter of Thomas Evelyn Scott-Ellis, 8th Baron Howard de Walden).

Miranda Seymour was two years old when her parents moved into Thrumpton Hall, the family ancestral home. She detailed her unconventional upbringing in her 2008 memoir In My Father's House: Elegy for an Obsessive Love (Simon & Schuster, UK), which appeared in the US as Thrumpton Hall (HarperCollins) and won the 2008 Pen Ackerley Prize for Memoir of the Year.

She studied at Bedford College, London, now part of Royal Holloway, University of London, earning a BA in English in 1981.

== Career ==
Seymour began her literary career in 1975 with an historical novel, The Stones of Maggiare. This was followed by six others concerned with Italy and Greece, including Daughter of Darkness, about Lucrezia Borgia, and Medea (1982).

In 1982, Seymour turned to biography, beginning with a group portrait of Henry James in his later years, entitled A Ring of Conspirators. This was followed by biographies of Lady Ottoline Morrell,(updated in 2024) Mary Shelley and Robert Graves, upon whom she also based a novel, The Telling, and a radio play, Sea Music.

In 2001, she came across material on Hellé Nice, a forgotten French Grand Prix racing driver of the 1930s and in 2004 published a book, The Bugatti Queen, about Nice's ultimately tragic life. The book provided the material for an exhibition about Helle Nice on show until October 2025 at the Mac Museum at Singen, Germany. The Bugatti Queen was followed by another life of an unconventional woman, that of 1930s film star, Virginia Cherrill. This was also based on a substantial archive in private ownership, and published as Chaplin's Girl: The Lives and Loves of Virginia Cherrill in 2009.

In 2002, Seymour published a book about herbs: A Brief History of Thyme. Noble Endeavours: Stories from England; Stories from Germany appeared in September 2013 from Simon & Schuster and was described as being a magnificent, deeply researched and scholarly work of 'unfazed optimism'.

Seymour returned to biography with In Byron's Wake (2018) which covered the lives of Lord Byron's wife and daughter, Annabella Milbanke and Ada Lovelace. I Used to Live Here Once: The Haunted Life of Jean Rhys was published by HarperCollins in 2022. I, Vera: The Many Lives of a Radical Princess was published by HarperCollins in May 2026 and has been widely praised.

Seymour reviews and has written articles for newspapers and literary journals, including The Economist, The Times, the Times Literary Supplement, the Financial Times, the Literary Review, and the New York Review of Books.

Formerly a visiting professor of English Studies at the University of Nottingham Trent, Seymour is a FRSL and FRSA and has served as a Royal Literary Fund Fellow at King's College London.

== Personal life ==
On 17 October 1972, she married, as his second wife, author Andrew Sinclair. They had one son, Merlin George Sinclair (born 1973), and divorced on 6 June 1984.

Seymour later married writer Anthony Gottlieb. They divorced and she married Ted Lynch.

== Bibliography ==
=== Fiction ===
- The Stones of Maggiare: a story of the Sforzas (1975)
- Count Manfred: a Gothic tale (1976)
- Daughter of Darkness: Lucrezia Borgia (1977)
- The Goddess: Helen of Troy (1979)
- Madonna of the Island: stories from a village in Corfu (1980)
- Medea (1981)
- Carrying On (1984)
- The Reluctant Devil (1990)
- The Summer of '39 (1998), published in the UK (1997) as The Telling

=== Juvenile fiction ===
- Mumtaz the Magical Cat (1984)
- Caspar and the Secret Kingdom (1986)
- The Vampire of Verdonia (1986)
- Pierre and the Pamplemousse (1989)

=== Non-fiction ===
- A Ring of Conspirators: Henry James and his literary circle, 1895–1915 (1988)
- Ottoline Morrell: Life on the Grand Scale (1993)
- Robert Graves: Life on the Edge (1995)
- Mary Shelley (2001)
- A Brief History of Thyme (2002)
- The Bugatti Queen: In Search of a Motor-Racing Legend (2004)
- In My Father's House (2007); Thrumpton Hall in the US (2008)
- Chaplin's Girl: The Life and Loves of Virginia Cherrill (2009)
- Noble Endeavours – The Life of Two Countries, England and Germany, in Many Stories (2013)
- In Byron's Wake: The Turbulent Lives of Lord Byron's Wife and Daughter: Annabella Milbanke and Ada Lovelace (2018)
- I Used to Live Here Once: The Haunted Life of Jean Rhys (2022)
