= Marquess of Hertford =

Marquessate in the Peerage of Great Britain

Marquessate of Hertford
- Arms: Sable, on a bend cotised Argent a Rose Gules, between two Annulets of the first (for Conway); quartering Quarterly, 1st and 4th: Or, on a Pile Gules between six Fleurs-de-lys Azure three Lions of England (special grant); 2nd and 3rd: Gules, two Wings conjoined in lure Or (Seymour, arms of Edward Seymour, 1st Duke of Somerset (d.1552)). Crests: 1st: the Bust of a Moor in profile couped at the shoulders proper, and wreathed about the temples Argent and Azure (Conway). 2nd: out of a Ducal Coronet Or, a Phoenix Or, issuing from of flames proper (Seymour). Supporters: On either side a Blackamoor wreathed about the temples Or and Sable, habited in short golden garments and in buskins gold, adorned about their waists with red and green feathers, each holding in his exterior hand a Shield Azure, garnished Or, the dexter charged with a Sun-in-Splendour gold, and the sinister with a Crescent Argent.
- Creation date: 5 July 1793
- Creation: Second
- Created by: George III
- Peerage: Peerage of Great Britain
- First holder: Francis Seymour-Conway, 1st Marquess of Hertford
- Present holder: Henry Seymour, 9th Marquess of Hertford
- Heir apparent: William Seymour, Earl of Yarmouth
- Remainder to: The 1st Marquess's heirs male of the body lawfully begotten
- Subsidiary titles: Earl of Hertford; Earl of Yarmouth; Viscount Beauchamp; Baron Conway; Baron Conway and Killultagh
- Status: Extant
- Seat: Ragley Hall
- Motto: FIDE ET AMORE (By faith and love)
- For the 1st Creation see the Dukedom of Somerset

The titles of Earl of Hertford and Marquess of Hertford have been created several times in the peerages of England and Great Britain.

The third Earldom of Hertford was created in 1559 for Edward Seymour, who was simultaneously created Baron Beauchamp of Hache. His grandson William Seymour was subsequently created Marquess of Hertford and restored to the title of Duke of Somerset; the Marquessate became extinct in 1675 and the other three titles in 1750.

The present Marquessate was created in 1793. Lord Hertford holds the subsidiary titles of Earl of Yarmouth (Peerage of Great Britain, 1793), Earl of Hertford (Peerage of Great Britain, 1750), Viscount Beauchamp (Peerage of Great Britain, 1750), Baron Conway, of Ragley in the County of Warwick (Peerage of England, 1703), and Baron Conway of Killultagh, of Killultagh in the County of Antrim (Peerage of Ireland, 1712). Lord Hertford's heir uses the style Earl of Yarmouth.

The Marquesses of Hertford are members of the Seymour family headed by the Duke of Somerset. Francis Seymour (1679–1732) was the fourth son of Sir Edward Seymour of Berry Pomeroy, 4th Baronet, a descendant of Edward Seymour, 1st Duke of Somerset (Sir Edward's grandson Sir Edward Seymour, 6th Baronet, of Berry Pomeroy succeeded as 8th Duke of Somerset in 1750). Upon the death of his elder brother, Francis succeeded to the estates of his relative Edward Conway, 1st Earl of Conway. In 1703 he was created Baron Conway in the Peerage of England and assumed the additional surname of Conway. In 1712 he was created Baron Conway of Killultagh in the Peerage of Ireland. In 1750 his son Francis Seymour-Conway, 2nd Baron Conway, was created Viscount Beauchamp and Earl of Hertford. These were revivals of titles previously held by the Dukes of Somerset, which had become extinct the same year on the death of Seymour-Conway's kinsman Algernon Seymour, 7th Duke of Somerset. In 1793 he was further honoured when he was made Earl of Yarmouth and Marquess of Hertford. The latter title had also previously been held by the Dukes of Somerset, but had become extinct in 1675 (see below).

The family seat is Ragley Hall, near Alcester, Warwickshire.

== Earls of Hertford, First creation (1138) ==
- Richard Fitz Gilbert de Clare (d. 1136), traditionally but erroneously called Earl of Hertford
- Gilbert de Clare, 1st Earl of Hertford (d. 1153) Son of the above.
- Roger de Clare, 2nd Earl of Hertford (d. 1173) Brother of the above.
- Richard de Clare, 3rd Earl of Hertford (d. 1217) Son of the above.
- Gilbert de Clare, 4th Earl of Hertford (d. 1230) became 5th Earl of Gloucester in 1218
- For further Earls, merged with the Earl of Gloucester.

== Earls of Hertford, Second creation (1537) ==
- Edward Seymour, 1st Duke of Somerset, 1st Earl of Hertford (1500–1552), forfeit 1552

== Earls of Hertford, Third creation (1559) ==
- Edward Seymour, 1st Earl of Hertford (1539–1621)
- William Seymour, 2nd Earl of Hertford (1587–1660) (became Marquess of Hertford in 1641)

== Marquesses of Hertford, First creation (1641) ==
- William Seymour, 2nd Duke of Somerset, 1st Marquess of Hertford, 2nd Earl of Hertford (1587–1660) (restored to the Dukedom of Somerset in 1660)
- William Seymour, 3rd Duke of Somerset, 2nd Marquess of Hertford, 3rd Earl of Hertford (1651–1671)
- John Seymour, 4th Duke of Somerset, 3rd Marquess of Hertford, 4th Earl of Hertford (died 1675) (Marquessate extinct 1675)

== Earls of Hertford, Third creation (1559; Reverted) ==
- Francis Seymour, 5th Duke of Somerset, 5th Earl of Hertford (1658–1678)
- Charles Seymour, 6th Duke of Somerset, 6th Earl of Hertford (1662–1748)
- Algernon Seymour, 7th Duke of Somerset, 7th Earl of Hertford (1684–1750) (Earldom extinct on his death in 1750)

== Barons Conway, Second creation (1703) ==
- Francis Seymour-Conway, 1st Baron Conway (1679–1732)
- Francis Seymour-Conway, 2nd Baron Conway, (1718–1794) (created Earl of Hertford in 1750 and Marquess of Hertford in 1793)

== Earls of Hertford, Fourth creation (1750) ==
- Francis Seymour-Conway, 1st Earl of Hertford, 1st Viscount Beauchamp, 2nd Baron Conway (1718–1794) (created Marquess of Hertford and Earl of Yarmouth in 1793)

== Marquesses of Hertford, Second creation (1793) ==
- Francis Seymour-Conway, 1st Marquess of Hertford (1718–1794)
- Francis Ingram-Seymour-Conway, 2nd Marquess of Hertford (1743–1822)
- Francis Charles Seymour-Conway, 3rd Marquess of Hertford (1777–1842)
- Richard Seymour-Conway, 4th Marquess of Hertford (1800–1870)
- Francis Hugh George Seymour, 5th Marquess of Hertford (1812–1884)
- Hugh de Grey Seymour, 6th Marquess of Hertford (1843–1912)
- George Francis Alexander Seymour, 7th Marquess of Hertford (1871–1940)
- Hugh Edward Conway Seymour, 8th Marquess of Hertford (1930–1997)
- Henry Jocelyn Seymour, 9th Marquess of Hertford (b. 1958)

The heir apparent is the present holder's eldest son, William Francis Seymour, Earl of Yarmouth (b. 1993)
The heir apparent's heir apparent is his eldest son, Clement Andrew Seymour, Viscount Beauchamp (b. 2019)

== Family tree and line of succession ==
Peerage family tree of the Dukes of Beaufort, Lancaster, and Somerset and subsidiary titles

Earl of Dorset (possibly 1st creation), 1070
Roger de Beaumont c. 1015–1094	Saint Osmund d. 1099; Bishop of Salisbury and possibly Earl of Dorset
Earl of Dorset (1st creation) discontinued, 1099
Earl of Leicester (1st creation), 1107
King Henry I c. 1068–1135	King Stephen; 1092/1096–1154	Robert de Beaumont c. 1040/1050–1118; 1st Earl of Leicester	Henry de Beaumont d. 1119; Earl of Warwick
Earl of Worcester (1st creation), 1138
Robert FitzRoy c. 1090–1147; Earl of Gloucester	Matilda (d. bef. 1141)	Waleran de Beaumont; 1104–1166; Earl of Worcester	Robert de Beaumont; 1104–1168; 2nd Earl of Leicester	Hugh de Beaumont b. 1106; Earl of Bedford
Earldom of Worcester (1st creation) extinct, 1166
William FitzRobert; 1116–1183; Earl of Gloucester	Hawise de Beaumont	Robert de Beaumont d. 1190; 3rd Earl of Leicester
Robert de Beaumont d. 1204; 4th Earl of Leicester	Amice; Countess of Rochefort
King John; 1166–1216	Isabella; 1173/1174–1217; Countess of Gloucester	Simon de Montfort c. 1175–1218; 5th Earl of Leicester
King Henry III; 1207–1272	Eleanor of England	Simon de Montfort c. 1208–1265; 6th Earl of Leicester
Earldom of Leicester (1st creation) forfeited, 1265
Earl of Leicester (2nd creation), 1267; Earl of Lancaster, 1276
King Edward I 1239–1307	Edmund Crouchback; 1245–1296; 1st Earl of Leicester, 1st Earl of Lancaster
Earldom of Leicester (2nd creation) restored, 1324; Earldom of Lancaster restored, 1327
King Edward II; 1284–1327	Thomas of Lancaster; 1278–1322; 2nd Earl of Leicester, 2nd Earl of Lancaster	Henry of Lancaster; 1281–1345; 3rd Earl of Leicester, 3rd Earl of Lancaster
Earldom of Leicester (2nd creation) and Earldom of Lancaster forfeited, 1322
Duke of Lancaster, 1351
King Edward III; 1312–1377	Henry of Grosmont c. 1310–1361; Duke of Lancaster, 4th Earl of Lancaster, 4th Earl of Leicester	Joan of Lancaster c. 1312–1349 m. John (II) de Mowbray; 1310–1361; Baron Mowbray	Eleanor of Lancaster; 1318–1372	Mary of Lancaster c. 1320–1362
Earl of Worcester (2nd creation), 1397
John of Gaunt; 1340–1399; Duke of Lancaster, 5th Earl of Lancaster, (6th) Earl of Leicester jure uxoris Earl of Richmond	Blanche of Lancaster; 1342–1368; 5th Countess of Lancaster, (6th) Countess of Leicester	Maud of Lancaster; 1340–1362 a.k.a. Matilda, Countess of Hainault	William; 1330–1389; Duke of Bavaria and Count of Holland, (5th) Earl of Leicester jure uxoris	Richard Fitzalan; 1346–1397; Earl of Arundel	Thomas Percy; 1343–1403; Earl of Worcester
Earldom of Worcester (2nd creation) extinct, 1403
Eleanor Mowbray d. bef. 1387 m. Roger La Warr; 1326–1370
Earl of Somerset (1st creation), 1397; Marquess of Somerset and Marquess of Dorset (1st creation), 1397	Earl of Dorset (2nd creation), 1411
Henry Bolingbroke; 1367–1413; Duke of Lancaster, (7th) Earl of Leicester later King Henry IV	John Beaufort c. 1373–1410; Marquess of Somerset, Marquess of Dorset, 1st Earl of Somerset	Thomas Beaufort c. 1377–1426; Duke of Exeter, Earl of Dorset	Joan Beaufort c. 1379–1440	Joan La Warr m. Thomas West; 1365–1405; Baron West	Joan de Beauchamp; 1375–1435
Earldom of Leicester (2nd creation) and Dukedom of Lancaster merged into the Crown, 1399	Marquessate of Somerset and Marquessate of Dorset (1st creation) revoked, 1399	Earldom of Dorset (2nd creation) extinct, 1426
Duke of Lancaster, 1399	Earl of Worcester (3rd creation), 1421
Henry of Monmouth; 1386–1422; Duke of Lancaster later King Henry V	Richard Beauchamp; 1394–c. 1422; Earl of Worcester	Reginald West; 1395–1450; Baron De La Warr and Baron West
Dukedom of Lancaster merged into the Crown, 1413	Earldom of Worcester (3rd creation) extinct, 1422
Duke of Somerset (1st creation), 1443	Earl of Dorset (3rd creation), 1442; Marquess of Dorset (2nd creation), 1443; Duke of Somerset (2nd creation), 1448
Henry Beaufort; 1401–1418; 2nd Earl of Somerset	John Beaufort; 1404–1444; 1st Duke of Somerset, 3rd Earl of Somerset	Edmund Beaufort; 1406–1455; 2nd Duke of Somerset, 1st Marquess of Dorset, etc., 4th Earl of Somerset	Richard Neville; 1400–1460; Earl of Salisbury	Edward Neville d. 1476; Baron Bergavenny	Elizabeth Beauchamp; 1415–1448	Richard West; 1430–1476; Baron De La Warr, Baron West
Dukedom of Somerset (1st creation) extinct, 1444
Claimed titles here are disputed	Earl of Worcester (4th creation), 1449
Margaret Beaufort; 1443–1509	Elizabeth Woodville c. 1437–1492	Henry Beaufort; 1436–1464; 3rd Duke of Somerset, 2nd Marquess of Dorset, 5th Earl of Dorset	Edmund Beaufort c. 1438–1471; 4th Duke of Somerset, 3rd Marquess of Dorset, 6th Earl of Dorset	Cecily Neville c. 1425–1450	John Tiptoft; 1427–1470; 1st Earl of Worcester
Dukedom of Somerset (2nd creation), Marquessate of Dorset (2nd creation), and Earldom of Dorset attained, 1461, but possibly restored (disputed), 1463	Dukedom of Somerset (2nd creation), Marquessate of Dorset (2nd creation), and Earldom of Dorset extinct, 1471	Earldom of Worcester (4th creation) attainted, 1470
Thomas West c. 1457–1525; Baron De La Warr, Baron West
Marquess of Dorset (3rd creation), 1475	Earl of Worcester (5th creation), 1514	Earl of Worcester (4th creation) restored, 1471
Margery Wentworth c. 1478–1550	King Henry VII; 1457–1509	Elizabeth of York; 1466–1503	Thomas Grey; 1451–1501; 1st Marquess of Dorset	Charles Somerset c. 1460–1526; 1st Earl of Worcester	Elizabeth Somerset c. 1476–1507; 3rd Baroness Herbert suo jure	Edward Tiptoft c. 1469–1485; 2nd Earl of Worcester	Eleanor West b. 1481 m. Edward Guildford c. 1474–1534
Earldom of Worcester (4th creation) extinct, 1485
Viscount Beauchamp "of Hache" (1st creation), 1536; Earl of Hertford (2nd creation), 1537; Duke of Somerset (4th creation), 1547	Duke of Somerset (3rd creation), 1499
Edward Seymour c. 1500–1552; Duke of Somerset, Earl of Hertford, etc.	Jane Seymour c. 1508–1537	King Henry VIII; 1491–1547	Thomas Grey; 1477–1530; 2nd Marquess of Dorset	Henry Somerset c. 1495–1548; 2nd Earl of Worcester, 4th Baron Herbert	Mary Tudor; 1496–1533; Queen of France; Duchess of Suffolk	Edmund Tudor; 1499–1500; 1st Duke of Somerset	Jane Guildford c. 1508/1509–1555 m. John Dudley; 1504–1553; Duke of Northumberland
Dukedom of Somerset (4th creation), Earldom of Hertford (2nd creation), and Viscountcy Beauchamp (1st creation) forfeit, 1552	Dukedom of Somerset (3rd creation) extinct, 1500
Duke of Richmond and Somerset, 1525
King Edward VI; 1537–1553	Henry Fitzroy; 1519–1536; 1st Duke of Richmond and Somerset	Henry Grey; 1517–1554; Duke of Suffolk, 3rd Marquess of Dorset	Frances Brandon; 1517–1559; Duchess of Suffolk
Dukedom of Richmond and Somerset extinct, 1536	Marquessate of Dorset (3rd creation) attainted and honours forfeit, 1554
Earl of Hertford (3rd creation) and Viscount Beauchamp "of Hache" (2nd creation), 1559	Earl of Leicester (3rd creation), 1564	Baron Buckhurst (1st creation), 1567; Earl of Dorset (4th creation), 1604
Edward Seymour c. 1528–1593	Edward Seymour; 1539–1621; Earl of Hertford, etc.	Katherine Grey; 1540–1568	William Somerset c. 1526–1589; 3rd Earl of Worcester, 5th Baron Herbert	John Dudley c. 1527–1554; Earl of Warwick	Robert Dudley; 1532–1588; 1st Earl of Leicester	Mary Dudley c. 1530–1586 m. Henry Sidney	Guildford Dudley c. 1535–1554	Jane Grey; 1537–1554; Disputed Queen of England	Thomas Sackville; 1536–1608; 1st Earl of Dorset, etc.
Earldom of Hertford (3rd creation) forfeit, 1552	Earldom of Leicester (3rd creation) extinct, 1588
Seymour baronets, of Berry Pomeroy, 1611	Earl of Leicester (4th creation), 1618
Edward Seymour c. 1563–1613; 1st Baronet	Edward Seymour; 1561–1612; Viscount Beauchamp	Edward Somerset; 1553–1628; 4th Earl of Worcester, 6th Baron Herbert	Philip Sidney; 1554–1586	Mary Sidney; 1561–1621	Robert Sidney; 1563–1626; 1st Earl of Leicester	Robert Sackville; 1561–1609; 2nd Earl of Dorset, etc.
Marquess of Hertford (1st creation), 1641; Duke of Somerset (4th creation restored), 1660	Baron Seymour of Trowbridge, 1641	Marquess of Worcester, 1642	Viscount Somerset of Cashel, 1626	Viscount Rochester, 1611; Earl of Somerset (3rd creation), 1613
Edward Seymour c. 1580–1659; 2nd Baronet	William Seymour; 1588–1660; 2nd Duke of Somerset, 1st Marquess of Hertford, 2nd Earl of Hertford	Francis Seymour c. 1590–1664; 1st Lord Seymour of Trowbridge	Henry Somerset; 1577–1646; 1st Marquess of Worcester, 5th Earl of Worcester, 7th Baron Herbert	Thomas Somerset; 1579–1651; Viscount Somerset	Robert Sidney; 1595–1677; 2nd Earl of Leicester	Richard Sackville; 1589–1624; 3rd Earl of Dorset, etc.	Edward Sackville; 1591–1652; 4th Earl of Dorset, etc.	Robert Carr c. 1587–1645; Earl of Somerset, etc.
Viscountcy Somerset extinct, 1651	Earldom of Somerset (3rd creation) and Viscountcy Rochester extinct, 1645
Edward Seymour; 1610–1688; 3rd Baronet	Henry Seymour c. 1626–1654; Lord Beauchamp	Charles Seymour c. 1621–1665; 2nd Lord Seymour of Trowbridge	Edward Somerset; 1601–1667; 2nd Marquess of Worcester, 6th Earl of Worcester, 8th Baron Herbert	Philip Sidney; 1619–1698; 3rd Earl of Leicester	Algernon Sidney; 1623–1683	Lucy Sidney; 1630–1685	Henry Sidney; 1641–1704; Earl of Romney	Richard Sackville; 1522–1677; 5th Earl of Dorset, etc.
Duke of Beaufort, 1682	Baron Cranfield, 1674; Earl of Middlesex (2nd creation), 1675
Edward Seymour; 1633–1708; 4th Baronet	William Seymour; 1650–1671; 3rd Duke of Somerset, 2nd Marquess of Hertford, 3rd Earl of Hertford	John Seymour c. 1646–1675; 4th Duke of Somerset, 3rd Marquess of Hertford, 4th Earl of Hertford	Francis Seymour; 1658–1678; 5th Duke of Somerset, 3rd Lord Seymour of Trowbridge	Charles Seymour; 1662–1748; 6th Duke of Somerset	Henry Somerset; 1629–1700; 1st Duke of Beaufort, 3rd Marquess of Worcester, 7th Earl of Worcester, 9th Baron Herbert	Robert Sidney; 1649–1702; 4th Earl of Leicester	Thomas Pelham; 1653–1712	Charles Sackville; 1522–1677; 6th Earl of Dorset, etc., 1st Earl of Middlesex, etc.
Marquessate of Hertford (1st creation) extinct, 1675
Baron Conway of Ragley, 1703; Baron Conway of Killultagh, 1712	Duke of Dorset, 1720
Edward Seymour; 1663–1740; 5th Baronet	Francis Seymour-Conway; 1679–1732; 1st Baron Conway	Edward Coke d. 1707	Algernon Seymour; 1684–1750; 7th Duke of Somerset, Earl of Northumberland	Charles Somerset; 1660–1698 styled Marquess of Worcester	Philip Sidney; 1676–1705; 5th Earl of Leicester	John Sidney; 1680–1737; 6th Earl of Leicester	Jocelyn Sidney; 1682–1743; 7th Earl of Leicester	Elizabeth Pelham; 1681–1711	Lionel Sackville; 1688–1765; 1st Duke of Dorset, 7th Earl of Dorset, etc., 2nd Earl of Middlesex, etc.
Earldom of Leicester (4th creation) extinct, 1743
Baron Lovel, of Minster Lovel, 1728; Earl of Leicester (5th creation) and Viscount Coke, 1744
Edward Seymour; 1695–1757; 8th Duke of Somerset; 6th Baronet	Anne Coke	Thomas Coke; 1697–1759; Earl of Leicester, etc.	Henry Somerset; 1684–1714; 2nd Duke of Beaufort, 4th Marquess of Worcester, 8th Earl of Worcester, 10th Baron Herbert	Charles Townshend; 1700–1764; Viscount Townshend
Earl of Hertford (4th creation) and Viscount Beauchamp (2nd creation), 1850; Marquess of Hertford (2nd creation) and Earl of Yarmouth (3rd creation), 1793	Earldom of Leicester (5th creation) and subsidiary titles extinct, 1759	Viscount Sackville and Baron Bolebrooke, 1782
Edward Seymour; 1717–1792; 9th Duke of Somerset	Webb Seymour; 1718–1793; 10th Duke of Somerset	Francis Seymour; 1726–1799	Francis Seymour-Conway; 1718–1794; 1st Marquess of Hertford, etc., 2nd Baron Conway	Wenman (Roberts) Coke c. 1717–1776	Henry Somerset-Scudamore; 1707–1745; 3rd Duke of Beaufort, 5th Marquess of Worcester, 9th Earl of Worcester, 11th Baron Herbert	Charles Noel Somerset; 1709–1756; 4th Duke of Beaufort, 6th Marquess of Worcester, 10th Earl of Worcester, 12th Baron Herbert	George Townshend; 1724–1807; Marquess Townshend	Charles Sackville; 1711–1769; 2nd Duke of Dorset, 8th Earl of Dorset, etc., 3rd Earl of Middlesex, etc.	John Sackville; 1713–1765	George Germain; 1716–1785; 1st Viscount Sackville, etc.
Earl of Leicester (7th creation) and Viscount Coke (2nd creation), 1837	Baron Botetourt abeyance terminated, 1803	Earl of Leicester (6th creation), 1784
Francis Compton Seymour d. 1822	Francis Ingram-Seymour-Conway; 1743–1822; 2nd Marquess of Hertford, etc., 3rd Baron Conway	Hugh Seymour; 1759–1801	Thomas William Coke; 1754–1842; 1st Earl of Leicester, etc.	Henry Somerset; 1744–1803; 5th Duke of Beaufort, 7th Marquess of Worcester, 11th Earl of Worcester, 13th Baron Herbert, 5th Baron Botetourt	George Townshend; 1753–1811; 2nd Marquess Townshend, 1st Earl of Leicester	John Frederick Sackville; 1745–1799; 3rd Duke of Dorset, 9th Earl of Dorset, etc., 4th Earl of Middlesex, etc.
Baron Raglan, 1852
Edward Adolphus St Maur; 1775–1855; 11th Duke of Somerset	Francis Charles Seymour-Conway; 1777–1842; 3rd Marquess of Hertford, etc., 4th Baron Conway	George Seymour; 1787–1870	Henry Charles Somerset; 1766–1835; 6th Duke of Beaufort, 8th Marquess of Worcester, 12th Earl of Worcester, 14th Baron Herbert, 6th Baron Botetourt	FitzRoy James Henry Somerset; 1788–1855; 1st Baron Raglan	George Townshend; 1778–1855; 3rd Marquess Townshend, 2nd Earl of Leicester	George John Frederick Sackville; 1793–1815; 4th Duke of Dorset, 10th Earl of Dorset, etc., 5th Earl of Middlesex, etc.	John Frederick Sackville; 1767–1843; 5th Duke of Dorset, 11th Earl of Dorset, 6th Earl of Middlesex, etc., 2nd Viscount Sackville, etc.
Earldom of Leicester (6th creation) extinct, 1855	Dukedom of Dorset, Earldoms of Dorset (4th creation) and Middlesex (2nd creation), Viscountcy of Sackville, Baronies of Buckhurst (1st creation), Cranfield, and Bolebrooke extinct, 1843
Francis Edward Seymour; 1788–1866	Richard Seymour-Conway; 1800–1870; 4th Marquess of Hertford, etc., 5th Baron Conway	Francis George Hugh Seymour; 1812–1884; 5th Marquess of Hertford, etc., 6th Baron Conway	Henry Somerset; 1792–1853; 7th Duke of Beaufort, 9th Marquess of Worcester, 13th Earl of Worcester, 15th Baron Herbert, 7th Baron Botetourt
Earl St. Maur, 1863
Edward Adolphus St Maur; 1804–1885; 12th Duke of Somerset	Archibald Henry Algernon St Maur; 1810–1891; 13th Duke of Somerset	Algernon Percy Banks St Maur; 1813–1894; 14th Duke of Somerset	Francis Payne Seymour; 1815–1870	Thomas William Coke; 1822–1909; 2nd Earl of Leicester, etc.	Henry Charles FitzRoy Somerset; 1824–1899; 8th Duke of Beaufort, 10th Marquess of Worcester, 14th Earl of Worcester, 16th Baron Herbert, 8th Baron Botetourt	Richard Henry FitzRoy Somerset; 1817–1884; 2nd Baron Raglan
Earldom St. Maur extinct, 1885
Edward Adolphus Ferdinand St. Maur; 1835–1869	Algernon St Maur; 1846–1923; 15th Duke of Somerset	Edward Hamilton Seymour; 1860–1931; 16th Duke of Somerset	Hugh de Grey Seymour; 1843–1912; 6th Marquess of Hertford, etc., 7th Baron Conway	Thomas William Coke; 1848–1941; 3rd Earl of Leicester, etc.	Henry Adelbert Wellington FitzRoy Somerset; 1847–1924; 9th Duke of Beaufort, 11th Marquess of Worcester, 15th Earl of Worcester, 17th Baron Herbert, 9th Baron Botetourt	Henry Richard Charles Somerset; 1849–1932	George FitzRoy Henry Somerset; 1857–1921; 3rd Baron Raglan
Evelyn Francis Edward Seymour; 1882–1954; 17th Duke of Somerset	George Francis Alexander Seymour; 1871–1940; 7th Marquess of Hertford, etc., 8th Baron Conway	Henry Charles Seymour; 1878–1939	Thomas William Coke; 1880–1949; 4th Earl of Leicester, etc.	Arthur George Coke; 1882–1915	Henry Charles Somers Augustus Somerset; 1874–1945	FitzRoy Richard Somerset; 1885–1964; 4th Baron Raglan
Percy Hamilton Seymour; 1910–1984; 18th Duke of Somerset	Thomas William Edward Coke; 1908–1976; 5th Earl of Leicester, etc.	Anthony Louis Lovel Coke; 1909–1994; 6th Earl of Leicester, etc.	Henry Hugh Arthur FitzRoy Somerset; 1900–1984; 10th Duke of Beaufort, 12th Marquess of Worcester, 16th Earl of Worcester, 18th Baron Herbert, 10th Baron Botetourt	Henry Robert Somers FitzRoy de Vere Somerset; 1898–1965
Barony Botetourt abeyant, 1984
Hugh Edward Conway Seymour; 1930–1997; 8th Marquess of Hertford, etc., 9th Baron Conway	Edward Douglas Coke; 1936–2015; 7th Earl of Leicester, etc.	David Robert Somerset; 1928–2017; 11th Duke of Beaufort, 13th Marquess of Worcester, 17th Earl of Worcester	FitzRoy John Somerset; 1927–2010; 5th Baron Raglan	Geoffrey Somerset; 1932–2025; 6th Baron Raglan
John Michael Edward Seymour b. 1952; 19th Duke of Somerset	Henry (Harry) Jocelyn Seymour b. 1958; 9th Marquess of Hertford, etc., 10th Baron Conway	Thomas Edward Coke b. 1965; 8th Earl of Leicester, etc.	Henry John FitzRoy Somerset b. 1952; 12th Duke of Beaufort, 14th Marquess of Worcester, 18th Earl of Worcester	Arthur Geoffrey Somerset; 1960–2012
Sebastian Edward Seymour b. 1982 styled Lord Seymour	William Francis Seymour b. 1993 styled Earl of Yarmouth	Edward Horatio Coke b. 2003 styled Viscount Coke	Henry Robert FitzRoy Somerset b. 1989 styled Marquess of Worcester	Inigo Arthur Fitzroy Somerset; 7th Baron Raglan b. 2004	Ivo Geoffrey Arthur Tarsus Somerset b. 2007
Heir apparent to the Dukedom of Somerset	Heir apparent to the Marquessate of Hertford	Heir apparent to the Earldom of Leicester	Heir apparent to the Dukedom of Beaufort	Heir presumptive to the Raglan Barony

Line of succession (simplified)
- Francis Seymour-Conway, 1st Marquess of Hertford (1718–1794)
  - Francis Ingram-Seymour-Conway, 2nd Marquess of Hertford (1743–1822)
    - Francis Seymour-Conway, 3rd Marquess of Hertford (1777–1842)
      - Richard Seymour-Conway, 4th Marquess of Hertford (1800–1870)
  - Vice-Admiral Lord Hugh Seymour (1759–1801)
    - Admiral of the Fleet Sir George Francis Seymour (1787–1870)
      - Francis Seymour, 5th Marquess of Hertford (1812–1884)
        - Hugh Seymour, 6th Marquess of Hertford (1843–1912)
          - George Seymour, 7th Marquess of Hertford (1871–1940)
          - Brigadier-General Lord Henry Charles Seymour (1878–1939)
            - Hugh Seymour, 8th Marquess of Hertford (1930–1997)
              - Henry Seymour, 9th Marquess of Hertford (born 1958)
                - (1). William Francis Seymour, Earl of Yarmouth (born 1993)
                  - (2). Clement Andrew Seymour, Viscount Beauchamp (born 2019)
                  - (3). Hon. Jocelyn William Seymour (born 2021)
                - (4). Lord Edward George Seymour (born 1995)
                  - (5). Henry Philip Seymour (born 2024)
          - Lord George Frederick Seymour (1881–1940)
            - Paul de Grey Horatio Seymour (1911–1942)
              - male issue in remainder
            - George Victor Seymour (1912–1953)
              - male issue in remainder
        - Lord Victor Alexander Seymour (1859–1935)
          - Conway Hugh Seymour (1886–1931)
            - male issue in remainder
          - William John Seymour (1900–1967)
            - male issue in remainder
    - Hugh Henry John Seymour (1790–1821)
      - Hugh Horatio Seymour (1821–1892)
        - Hugh Francis Seymour (1855–1930)
          - Horace James Seymour (1885–1978)
            - Hugh Francis Seymour (1926–2010)
              - male issue and descendants in remainder
  - Lord George Seymour (1763–1848)
    - George Hamilton Seymour (1797–1880)
      - Leopold Richard Seymour (1841–1904)
        - Richard Sturgis Seymour (1875–1959)
          - Leopold Richard Seymour (1912–2000)
            - male issue and descendants in remainder
          - George FitzRoy Seymour (1923–1994)
            - male issue and descendants in remainder
        - Sir Edward Seymour (1877–1948)
          - John Edward Seymour (1915–1972)
            - male issue and descendants in remainder
        - Beauchamp Seymour (1878–1965)
          - Julian Conway Seymour (1934–2023)
            - male issue and descendants in remainder
      - George Evelyn Seymour (1848–1884)
        - Archibald George Seymour (1875–1933)
          - Evelyn Roger Seymour (1908–1987)
            - male issue and descendants in remainder
          - Christopher George Seymour (1913–1983)
            - male issue and descendants in remainder

== See also ==
- Duke of Somerset
- Baron Alcester
- Seymour family
- Earl of Conway
