= Basilia de Clare =

Anglo-Norman noblewoman (fl. 1173–1201)

- Born: Before 1149
- Died: After 1201
- Occupation: noblewoman
- Spouse(s): Raymond fitz William; Geoffrey fitz Robert
- Relatives: brother Richard de Clare known as "Strongbow"

Basilia de Clare (fl. 1173–1201) was an Anglo-Norman noblewoman from the de Clare family. She married a supporter of her brother Richard de Clare known as "Strongbow".

== Life ==
Basilia was the daughter of Gilbert de Clare, 1st Earl of Pembroke and Isabel de Beaumont, and she had a brother named Richard de Clare. She must have been born in 1148 or before as her father died and her brother inherited his title early in that year. Her brother was about 18 years old, and Richard inherited the title 'count of Strigoil' Earl of Pembroke. It is probable that this title was not recognized at Henry II's coronation in 1154.

In 1173, Raymond fitz William wanted to marry Basilia, but her brother refused his permission, and Raymond fitz William left to live in Wales. He returned the following year when her brother summoned him. Her brother gave in to popular requests and allowed them to marry, and also made Raymond the constable of Leinster. The marriage took place at Wexford after Raymond and his troops had taken the town. In 1176, her brother died, and Basilia sent a signal to her husband in Munster to warn him that he should return to Dublin. She and Raymond had no children, and after he died, she married Geoffrey fitz Robert. She is believed to have died after 1201.
