= John Fitzgeoffrey =

13th-century English nobleman

- Arms of John Fitzgeoffrey; Quarterly, or and gules, a border vair.
- Born: 1205? Shere, Surrey, Kingdom of England
- Died: 23 November 1258
- Spouse: Isabel Bigod
- Issue: John; Richard; William; Maud; Isabel; Aveline; Joan
- Father: Geoffrey Fitz Peter, 1st Earl of Essex
- Mother: Aveline de Clare

John Fitzgeoffrey, Lord of Shere and Justiciar of Ireland (1205? – 23 November 1258) was an English nobleman and Crown official.

John Fitzgeoffrey was born in Shere, Surrey, son of Geoffrey Fitz Peter, 1st Earl of Essex and Aveline de Clare, daughter of Roger de Clare, 2nd Earl of Hertford and his wife, Maud de Saint-Hilaire.

== Justiciar of Ireland ==
He was appointed Justiciar of Ireland, serving from 1245 to 1255. He proved to be a strong, energetic and capable viceroy. The fact that an unusual number of Anglo-Norman lordships at the time were held by minors gave him an opportunity to assert the royal authority more forcefully than previous viceroys, especially in Ulster and Connacht. His interest in Irish affairs was no doubt partly due to his own large landholdings in Ireland, acquired by his marriage to Isabel Bigod, whose mother Maud Marshal was a great Anglo-Irish heiress. He held an assize in Ulster in 1247–8, during which he reorganised the government of the province. He built a bridge over the River Bann at Coleraine, and a fort nearby. He was determined to subdue the powerful Northern Uí Néill dynasties and had some success in doing so.

== Role in the baronial reform movement of 1258 ==
In 1258 he was one of the leaders of the baronial opposition to king Henry III. On 1 April 1258 Aymer, bishop of Winchester, sent a posse to attack John Fitzgeoffrey's men at Shere in Surrey, killing one of them. When a parliament opened at Westminster a week later, John Fitzgeoffrey demanded justice from the king; Henry excused Aymer, his half-brother, and refused justice thus angering the barons. On 12 April John formed an alliance with six other magnates to achieve reform.

== Marriage ==
He was not entitled to succeed his half-brother as Earl of Essex in 1227, the earldom having devolved from his father's first wife. He was the second husband of Isabel Bigod, daughter of Hugh Bigod, 3rd Earl of Norfolk and his wife Maud Marshal of Pembroke and widow of Gilbert de Lacy. They had six children, one being Maud, who married William de Beauchamp, 9th Earl of Warwick.

== Death ==
He died suddenly on 23 November 1258 and, despite his hostility to the king, Henry III ordered a mass to be celebrated for his soul and donated a cloth of gold to shroud his coffin. He had four daughters and three sons; the eldest of the latter predeceased his father, who was succeeded in turn by younger sons, first John and then Richard.

== Children ==
Note: The males took the FitzJohn surname ("fitz" means "son of").

- John FitzJohn of Shere (died 1275). Married Margary, daughter of Philip Basset of Wycombe (died 1271); no issue.
- Richard FitzJohn of Shere (died 1297). Lord FitzJohn from 1290. Married as her first husband, Emma (died 1332); no issue.
- William FitzJohn of Masworth (died 1270)
- Maud FitzJohn (died 16/18 April 1301). Married firstly to Gerard de Furnival, Lord of Hallamshire (died 1261). Married secondly to William de Beauchamp, 9th Earl of Warwick, son of William de Beauchamp of Elmley, Worcestershire and his wife Isabel Mauduit. Had issue.
- Isabel. Married Robert de Vipont, Lord of Westmorland (died 1264). Had issue.
- Aveline (1229–1274). Married Walter de Burgh, 1st Earl of Ulster (1230–1271). Had issue, including Richard Óg de Burgh, 2nd Earl of Ulster, who in turn married Margaret de Burgh, by whom he had ten children.
- Joan (died 4 April 1303). Married Theobald le Botiller. Had issue, from whom descend the Butler earls of Ormond.
