= Gilbert de Clare, 1st Earl of Hertford =

12th-century English nobleman

Gilbert Fitz Richard
- 1st Earl of Hertford; 4th Lord of Clare

Hereditary
- Earl of Hereford Lord of the Honor of Clare: 1138–1152 1136–1152
- Predecessor: Richard Fitz Gilbert de Clare
- Successor: Roger de Clare
- Other titles: 4th Lord of Tonbridge; Lord of Cardigan
- Born: 1115; Hertford, Hertfordshire, England
- Died: 1152 (aged 36–37)
- Family: de Clare
- Father: Richard Fitz Gilbert de Clare
- Occupation: Peerage of England

Gilbert FitzRichard de Clare, 1st Earl of Hertford (c. 1115–1152), feudal baron of Clare in Suffolk, was created Earl of Hertford by King Stephen.

== Career ==
Gilbert was the eldest son of Richard Fitz Gilbert de Clare and Adeliza. His mother Adeliza was the daughter of Ranulf le Meschin, 3rd Earl of Chester and Countess Lucy as well as the sister of Ranulf de Gernon, 4th Earl of Chester. Gilbert, who was born before 1115, succeeded his father to the honor of Clare including Tonbridge Castle on 15 Apr. 1136.

Gilbert was created Earl of Hertford about 1138, (Note: According to Round, he was created Earl of Hertford before Christmas, 1141.) possibly about the same time his uncle was created Earl of Pembroke. He was a supporter of King Stephen for a time, but seems to have joined the Empress Matilda at some point. When the king took Ranulf de Gernon, the Earl of Chester, prisoner the Earl gave his nephew Geoffrey as a guarantor for his liberation and good conduct.

== Second rebellion ==
In 1147, Ranulf de Gernon rebelled against King Stephen again. The king, in turn, seized Gilbert and held him prisoner until he agreed to surrender all his castles. After doing so the Earl of Hertford was released, but then joined his uncle Ranulf's rebellion. Gilbert, Earl of Pembroke, who up to this time had remained loyal to Stephen, then demanded his nephew Gilbert's castles 'maintaining that they were his by hereditary right'. When Stephen refused, Gilbert the Earl of Pembroke also joined Ranulph's rebellion. Stephen then confiscated his castles as well. Not long after, however, the king reconciled with both Gilberts, however, Ranulf de Gernon joined Henry of Anjou (later Henry II of England).

Gilbert died unmarried and without issue in 1152 and was buried at Clare Priory. He was succeeded by his brother Roger de Clare.

== Notes ==
Peerage of England
New creation	Earl of Hertford; 1138–1152	Succeeded by Roger de Clare
