= William le Deveneys =

13th century Irish administrator

Sir William le Deveneys (died 1319) was a Crown administrator and judge in late thirteenth and early fourteenth century Ireland, who served very briefly as Chief Justice of the Irish Common Pleas.

== Crown Servant ==
He was probably a native of Dublin, where he spent his whole career. The le Deveneys (later called Devenish) family were among the first Anglo-Norman settlers in Ireland. William was probably a relative of Nicholas le Deveneys, who was summoned for service in the Scottish War in 1302, and of another William le Deveneys, who in 1327 made a grant of his lands at Kells in Ossory to William Kenfeg. William is first heard of in 1278 when he was an official of the Exchequer of Ireland. He held several senior positions in the Exchequer, including Marshal, Chief Remembrancer, Engrosser (copier) and Prothonotary (Chief Clerk), at a salary of 100 marks a year. His pluralism gave rise to a good deal of criticism: the contemporary view was that "these offices ought not to be held by one person", and it was probably as a result of such strictures that he was finally removed from office as Remembrancer (the Remembrancer's task was to prepare the memoranda of the lawsuits to be heard by the Exchequer). He became Keeper of the Royal demesne lands in Ireland in 1281. His enemies claimed that he had bribed an eminent cleric to obtain office as Keeper, but there seems to be no evidence of this.

== Landowner ==
He was clearly a valued Crown official: he was given twelve oak trees from the royal forest at Glencree, County Wicklow in 1282. He also received a grant of the lands adjacent to the Royal Forest. Glencree, however, proved to be an almost worthless gift: it was in the Wicklow Mountains, remote from the city, and subject to frequent raids by the local Gaelic clans, the O'Tooles and O'Byrnes, which became a serious problem in the early 1290s. Within a few years after receiving the grant William in a petition to the Crown alleged that all his tenants had fled, and that he would be obliged for his own safety to live closer to Dublin.

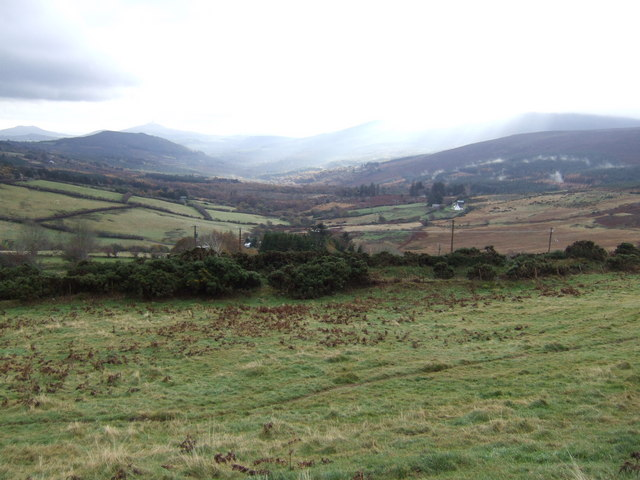
Glencree: le Deveneys was granted lands here, but later complained that they were uninhabitable

In 1283 King Edward I made him a grant of four carucates (480 acres) and 45 acres of land at Dunderg (Rathfarnham) in South County Dublin, "to hold of the King forever" in return for a twice-yearly payment of £7. He received other lands whose precise location is hard to determine, due to the archaic spelling of the place names in the Patent Rolls. In 1299 he was granted a part of the Royal manor of Thorncastle in south County Dublin, roughly corresponding to modern-day Booterstown and Mount Merrion, and the fishery attached to the manor, in return for payment of a knight's fee, "this being to the King's advantage", according to the jury which was empanelled to advise on the matter. Thorncastle had previously been held by the professional soldier Sir Richard FitzJohn (died 1297), who also served as a judge in Ireland. Deveneys also practised as an attorney in the Royal Courts: no doubt the Crown was his main client, but he also worked for private individuals, including a certain Matilda, with whom he seems to have had a long association.

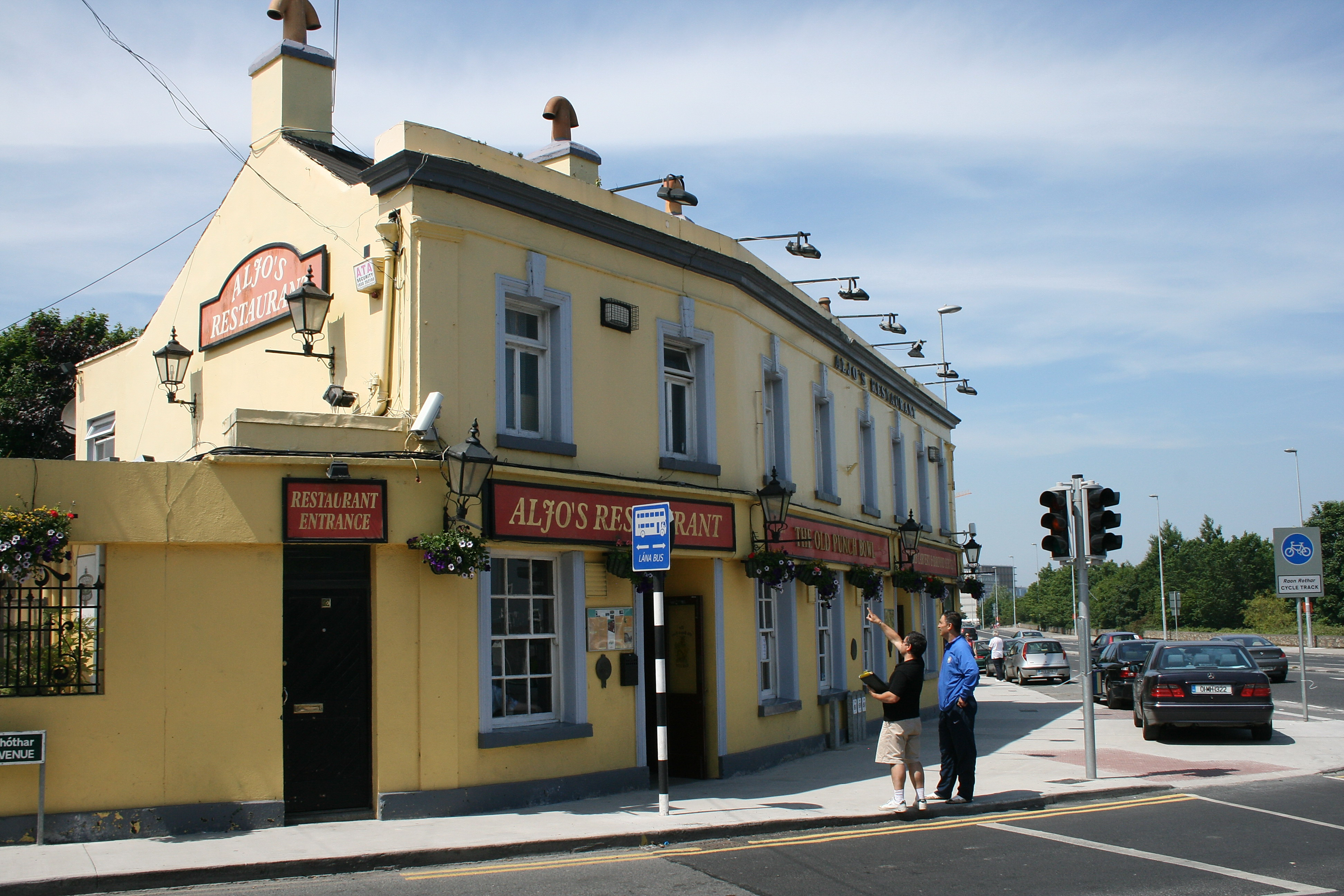
Booterstown, present day. In the Middle Ages, the district was called Thorncastle, where Deveneys had his Dublin estate.

== Judge ==
He was appointed to the Bench as a justice in eyre (itinerant justice) in 1301. He went on assize to County Cork that year. He became a judge of the Court of Common Pleas (Ireland), which was then simply called "the Bench", in 1303. In 1308 he was appointed Chief Justice of the Irish Common Pleas but resigned from that office shortly afterwards: he was reappointed to the Common Pleas in 1313, apparently after vigorous lobbying by his friends on his behalf. He was appointed Sheriff of Dublin City in 1308 (one of the first recorded holders of the office), and was knighted in 1312. An almost illegible entry in the Patent Roll for 1312 suggests that the Crown wished him to act as a mediator in a feud between William Burgh and Richard Clare.

He died in or shortly before 1319, being replaced on the Court of Common Pleas by William de la Hulle (19 August). His manor of Thorncastle was purchased after his death by his judicial colleague Walter de Islip. It subsequently passed to Sir John Cruys (died 1407), who built Merrion Castle on the site in the 1360s, and later became part of the vast Fitzwilliam holdings in South Dublin.

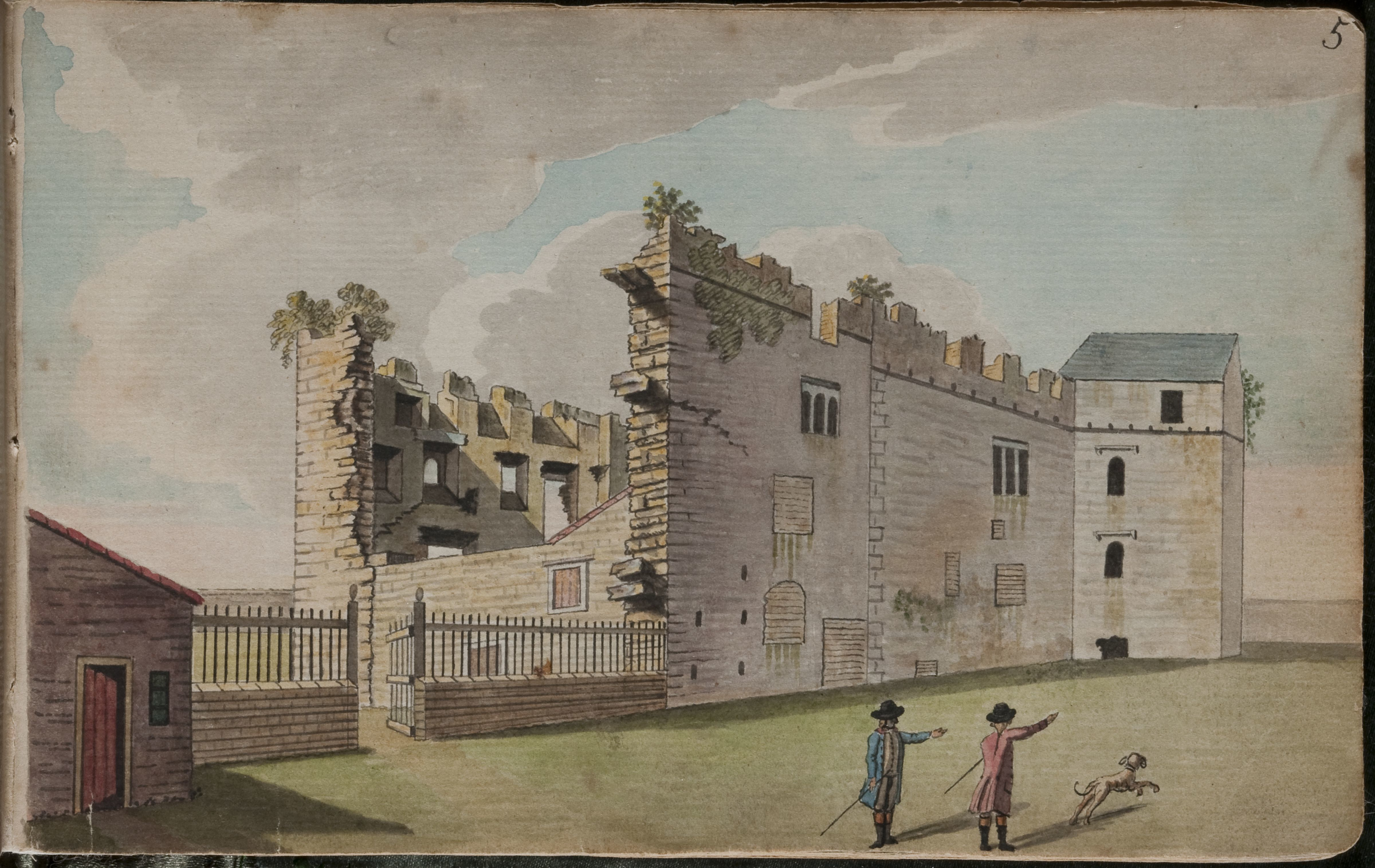
Merrion Castle, Watercolour by Gabriel Beranger, mid-eighteenth century

== Sources ==
- Ball, F. Elrington "History of Dublin" Vol.2 Dublin Alexander Thom and Co 1903
- Ball, F. Elrington The Judges in Ireland 1221-1921 London John Murray 1926
- Calendar of Documents relating to Ireland preserved in the Public Records Office London Longmans 1879
- Calendar of Irish Chancery letters c.1244-1509
- D'Alton, John King James's Irish Army List Privately Published Dublin 1855
- Hamilton, Reverend John G. and Armstrong, E C.R. On the Ancient Deeds of St John's Parish, Dublin (1816) Proceedings of the Royal Irish Academy Vol. 33 p. 175
- Hewer, S.G. Justice for all? Access by ethnic groups to the English Royal Courts in Ireland 1252-1318 Thesis submitted for degree of PhD Trinity College Dublin 2018
- Public Record Office List of Inquisitions 26 Edward I
