= Richard FitzJohn =

13th century English nobleman

- Arms of Richard FitzJohn. Quarterly, or and gules, a border vair.
- Died: 1297; Gascony
- Spouse: Emma
- Father: John Fitzgeoffrey
- Mother: Isabel Bigod

Richard FitzJohn (died 1297) was an English nobleman who fought in Wales and Gascony and served as a judge in Ireland.

== Life ==
Fitz-John was the second son of John Fitzgeoffrey and Isabel Bigod.

Richard is known to have married Emma, whose parentage is currently unknown. He seems to have spent the early 1270s in Ireland, where he served for a time as a judge and acquired lands. He succeeded his elder brother John FitzJohn in 1275, and inherited substantial lands in England. Richard took part during King Edward I of England's great campaign in 1277 against Llywelyn ap Gruffudd in Wales. In 1282 he served in a similar campaign in Wales, when Edward finally crushed Llywelyn.

He was summoned to proceed to Gascony with Edmund Crouchback in 1295 and was appointed Constable of Rockingham Castle. As Captain of Bourg in Gascony, the garrison was besieged by a French army under the command of Henry III de Sully. The town was in danger of starvation, before being relieved by Simon Mountagu. Richard later died in 1297 in Gascony. He died without issue, with his estates being inherited between his four sisters. His widow remarried Robert de Montalt, 1st Baron Montalt.

He was granted substantial estates by the Crown at Thorncastle in south County Dublin (modern-day Booterstown and Mount Merrion), Ireland, no doubt as a reward for his services to the Crown. The King regranted these lands to the Irish judge William le Deveneys two years after Sir Richard's death.
