= Honour of Clare =

Medieval feudal landholding in England

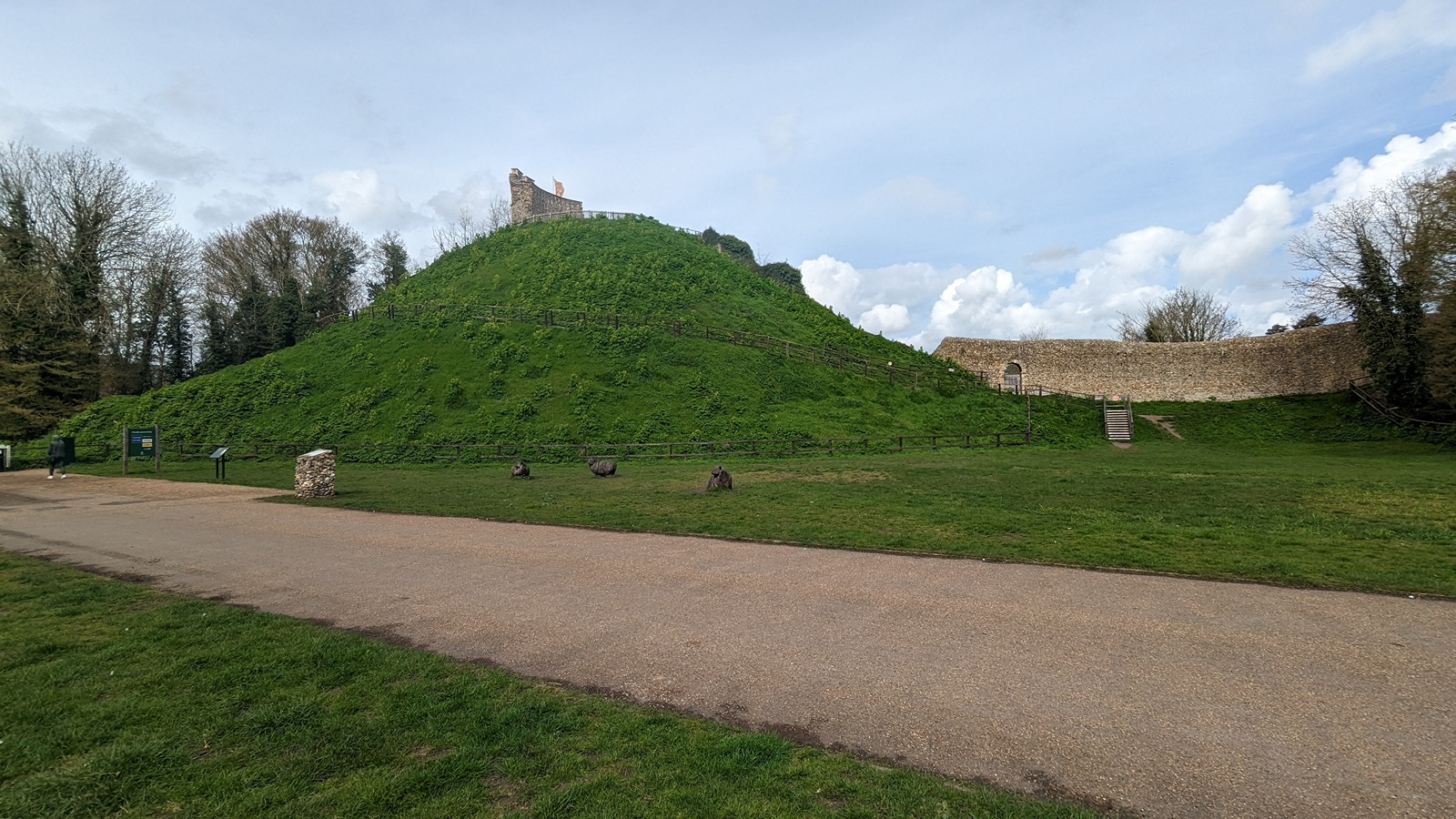
Ruins of Clare Castle

The Honour of Clare was a medieval English feudal barony centred on the town of Clare in Suffolk. It was established following the Norman Conquest and became one of the most important honours in East Anglia. The caput baroniae, or administrative centre, of the honour was Clare Castle, a motte-and-bailey structure later rebuilt in stone.

The honour was originally granted after the Revolt of the Earls in 1075 to Richard fitz Gilbert, a companion of William the Conqueror, who as Chief Justiciar had played a major part in suppressing the rebellion. He took the name "de Clare" from the estate. Originally, it consisted of lands in Essex and Suffolk that had previously belonged to Wihtgar Ælfricsson, an Essex thegn, and to Phin the Dane. During the twelfth century, the honour acquired valuable manors in Norfolk.

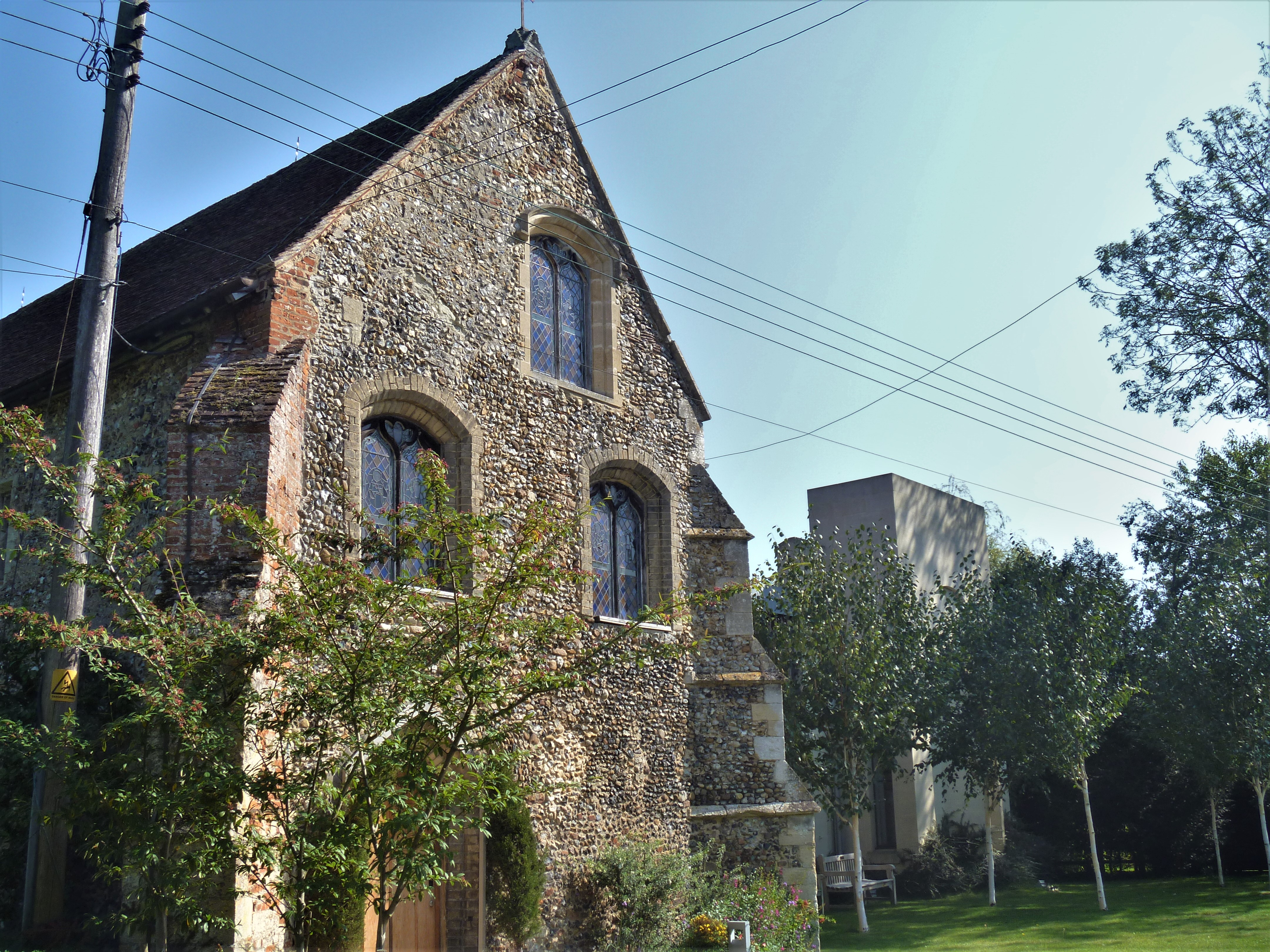
Clare Priory, established in 1248

His descendants, the powerful de Clare family, became Earls of Hertford and later Earls of Gloucester through marriage. At its height, the honour of Clare comprised lands in Suffolk, Essex, and other counties, making its holders among the wealthiest and most influential barons in England.

Gilbert de Clare, 8th Earl of Gloucester, died childless at the Battle of Bannockburn in 1314, and his possessions were divided among his sisters. The honour of Clare went to Elizabeth de Clare. In 1360, it was inherited by her granddaughter Elizabeth de Burgh, Countess of Ulster, wife of the English prince Lionel of Antwerp. In 1362, the title of Duke of Clarence was created for him by his father, King Edward III.

Elizabeth de Burgh died in 1363, and the honour of Clare was inherited by her daughter Philippa. She was the only child of Lionel of Antwerp, and with his death in 1368 the title of Duke of Clarence went extinct. In 1369, Philippa married Edmund Mortimer, 3rd Earl of March. Following her death in late 1370s, the honour of Clare became a possession of her descendants, members of Mortimer family.

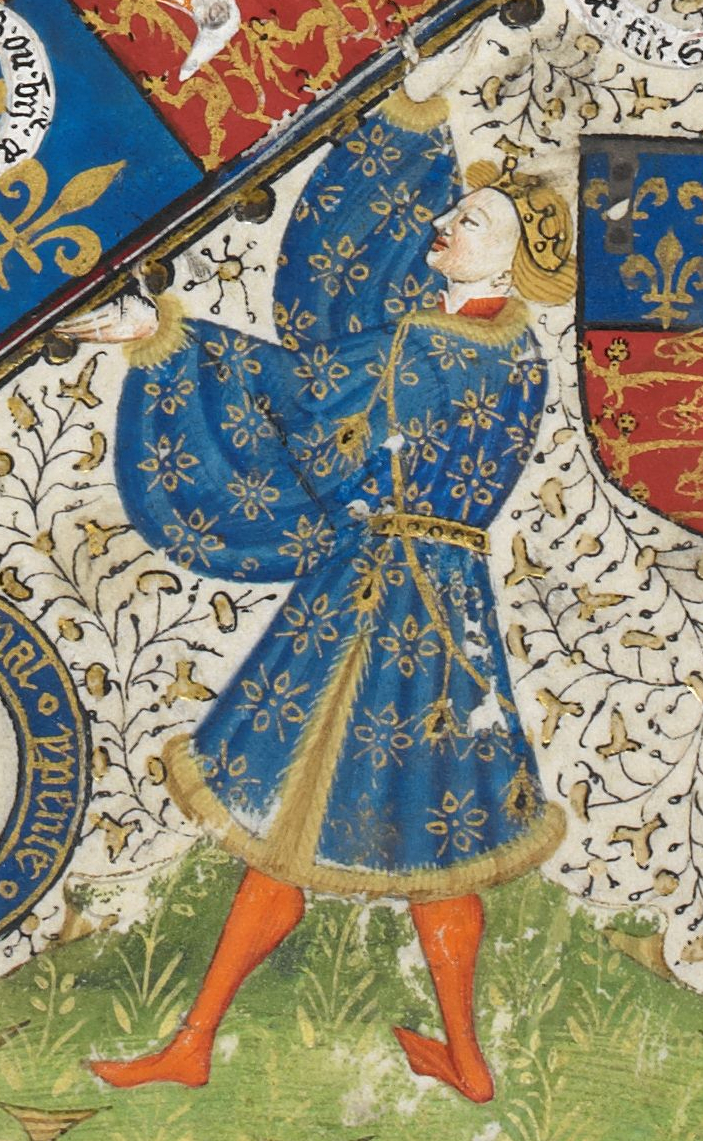
Depiction of Richard of York in the Talbot Shrewsbury Book

Edmund Mortimer, 5th Earl of March, died childless in 1425. His possessions were inherited by his nephew Richard of York, 3rd Duke of York. During the Wars of the Roses, he laid a claim to the English crown due to his descent from two sons of Edward III. Richard of York's son and heir Edward seized the throne in 1461. Soon after his accession, the honour of Clare was granted for life to his mother, Cecily Neville. She appointed John Howard, a cousin of her nephew John Mowbray, as steward for the honour.

In 1486, Henry VII decreed that upon Cecily's death the office of the steward of the honour of Clare should be granted for life to John de Vere, 13th Earl of Oxford. Cecily Neville died in 1495, and Clare was granted for life to her granddaughter Elizabeth of York, wife of Henry VII. Queen's lands were kept intact with the crown following her death in 1503.

During the reign of Henry VIII, the honour of Clare was a part of jointure granted to his wives Catherine of Aragon, Anne Boleyn, Anne of Cleves, Catherine Howard and Catherine Parr. Henry VIII died in 1547, and dowager queen Catherine Parr married Thomas Seymour. She died in 1548, bequeathing her property to her husband. Seymour was executed for treason in 1549, and all his possessions were seized by the crown.

In 1553, Edward VI granted Clare to his tutor John Cheke. Following the accession of Mary I, Cheke's property was seized. In 1558, the honour of Clare was annexed to the Duchy of Lancaster.

== See also ==
- History of Suffolk

== Sources ==
- Sanders, I. J. (1960). English Baronies: A Study of Their Origin and Descent, 1086–1327. Oxford University Press. ISBN 9780198217158.
- Ward, Jennifer C. (1964). "The Honour of Clare in Suffolk in the Early Middle Ages" (PDF). Proceedings of the Suffolk Institute of Archaeology & History.
- Ward, Jennifer C. (1983). "The place of the honour in Twelfth-Century Society: The Honour of Clare 1066-1217" (PDF). Proceedings of the Suffolk Institute of Archaeology & History.
- Ward, Jennifer C. (2016). "4 - The Court of the Honour of Clare, 1308–60: Feudal Incidents and Inquisitions". In Hicks, Michael (ed.). The Later Medieval Inquisitions Post Mortem: Mapping the Medieval Countryside and Rural Society. Boydell & Brewer. pp. 49–58. doi:10.1017/9781782048145.005. ISBN 978-1-78204-814-5.
