= Thrumpton Hall (book) =

2007 book by Miranda Seymour

- Author: Miranda Seymour
- Genre: Memoir
- Publication date: 2007
- ISBN: 978-0061466564

Thrumpton Hall: A Memoir of Life in My Father’s House is a work published in 2007 by Miranda Seymour.

The book describes, from the perspective of his alienated daughter, the life and times of the little-known George FitzRoy Seymour (1923–1994), proprietor of a declining English country estate (Thrumpton Hall) in Nottinghamshire, and a self-absorbed husband and father with aristocratic pretensions (he is distantly related to one of the many illegitimate offspring of Charles II). The book is primarily a memoir, judiciously narrated, yet with an undertone of daughterly displeasure that threatens, as the author knows, to overwhelm any hoped-for objectivity. It also uncovers biographical details that the author learns of only through having read her father’s diaries and having researched her family’s history by means of letters and other archival sources. In England, the book was published as In My Father’s House and subtitled Elegy for an Obsessive Love, a reference to George Seymour’s lifelong preoccupation with the grand house (originating in the sixteenth century) that he managed to inherit through his own designs, despite not being the son of the previous owner, Charles Byron (a descendant of Lord Byron and an uncle-by-marriage to George). The book, however, is anything but an elegy, and a sustained examination of George’s obsession with the house is but one part of the author’s concern.

The other part of Seymour's method involves the interrogation of the hated father and the detailing of his deleterious decisions and actions, as viewed more than a decade after his death. His character, that of a "priggish", snobbish adolescent embarrassed by his parents, and a gently domineering father/husband too obviously desperate for a social status that he cannot achieve, is painted in exuberant English prose. Among George's quirks are a lifelong lack of friends, a serious devotion to letter-writing, an intense focus on the social graces and personal hygiene, an inability to appreciate the needs of other family members, and a tendency to aggrandize his own station in life. The chief quirk of Master George, however, is his abandonment, late in life, of most of his family duties, not to mention all upper-class appearances, as he takes to dressing up in leathers and touring country roads (often at night) on a motorcycle. In the process, he befriends, or rather falls in love with, an illiterate "lad" or two, principally a person named Robbie, whom George calls Tigger after the Winnie-the-Pooh character (to his own Christopher Robin). No one else is amused, particularly when Robbie begins to displace others who are slated to inherit family property. Although this aspect of the story supplies a certain drama, there is no shortage of human drama and tension, of mortal helplessness and hubris, elsewhere in the book. Throughout, the voice of the author's mother provides a light counterpoint to Miranda Seymour's own observations and opinions.

Seymour was awarded the PEN/Ackerley Prize for her memoir in 2008.
