= Château d'Orbec =

Ruined French castle

The Château d'Orbec was a castle in Orbec, Calvados, France.

Gilbert, Count of Brionne, built an early castle in 1035, which was confiscated from Gilbert de Clare, Earl of Pembroke, and given to Robert de Montfort. Robert held his uncle Waleran de Beaumont, Count of Meulan, captive in the castle. It was returned to Richard de Clare, Earl of Pembroke, after the forfeiture of Robert de Montfort in 1173. King Richard I of England, Duke of Normandy, gave the lordship of Orbec to William Marshal, Earl of Pembroke.

Bertrand du Guesclin, Constable of France, captured the castle in 1379 and destroyed it.
