= William FitzRobert, 2nd Earl of Gloucester =

Anglo-Norman nobleman

William FitzRobert
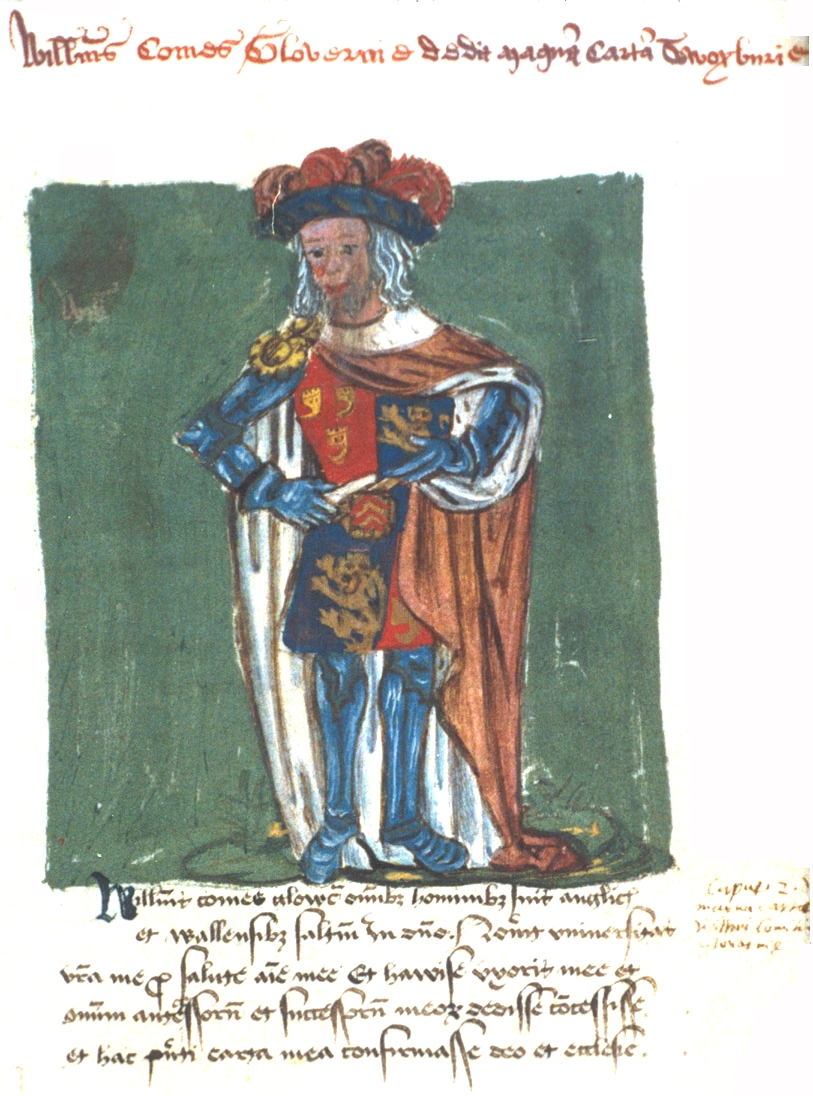
- William Earl of Gloucester gives his great charter to Tewkesbury Abbey. Tewkesbury Abbey Founders Book, Bodleian Library, Oxford, made in Tewkesbury c.1500-1525. His tabard displays his attributed arms quarterly 1st & 4th Gules three clarions or; 2nd & 3rd Azure, a lion rampant guardant or an inescutcheon Or, three chevrons gules. These are forms of the attributed arms of Robert FitzHamon and actual arms of de Clare, Earls of Gloucester

Earl of Gloucester
- Reign: 31 October 1147 – 23 November 1183
- Predecessor: Sir Robert de Caen
- Successor: John de Mortain
- Born: 22 January 1116
- Died: 23 November 1183 (aged 67)
- Spouse(s): Hawise de Beaumont
- Issue: Robert FitzWilliam; Mabel FitzWilliam; Amice FitzWilliam; Isabel, Countess of Gloucester
- Father: Sir Robert de Caen, 1st Earl of Gloucester
- Mother: Mabel FitzHamon of Gloucester

William FitzRobert, 2nd Earl of Gloucester (22 January 1116 – 23 November 1183) was the son and heir of Sir Robert de Caen, 1st Earl of Gloucester, and Mabel FitzRobert of Gloucester, daughter of Robert Fitzhamon, and nephew of Empress Matilda.

== Lineage ==
William FitzRobert was the son of Robert, 1st Earl of Gloucester, an illegitimate son of King Henry I of England, during whose reign William was born. Thus William was a nephew of the Empress Maud and a first cousin once removed of King Stephen, the principal combatants of the English Anarchy period. It also meant that William was the great-grandson of the famed William the Conqueror.

== Early career ==
In October 1141, William looked after the Baronial estates, when his father fell into the hands of partisans at Winchester. His father was exchanged for King Stephen, and, during his father's absence from Normandy in 1144, he served as Governor of Wareham. In 1147, he overthrew Henry de Tracy at Castle Cary.

In 1154, he made an alliance with Roger de Clare, 2nd Earl of Hertford, by which they agreed to aid each other against all men except Henry II of England.

FitzRobert granted Neath, a town in Glamorgan, a charter. He was Lord of the manor of Glamorgan, as well as Caerleon, residing chiefly at Cardiff Castle. It was there that, in 1158, he and his wife and son were captured by the Welsh Lord of Senghenydd, Ifor Bach ("Ivor the Little"), and carried away into the woods, where they were held as prisoners until the Earl redressed Ivor's grievances.

== Relationship with King Henry II ==
In 1173, the earl took the King's part against his sons, but, thereafter, he appears to have fallen under suspicion, given that the following year he submitted to the King and in 1175 surrendered to him Bristol Castle. Because his only son and heir, Robert, died in 1166, Earl William made John, the younger son of King Henry II, heir to his earldom, in conformity with the King's promise that John should marry one of the Earl's daughters, if the Church would allow it, they being related in the third degree.

Earl William was present in March 1177 when the King arbitrated between the Kings of Castile and Navarre, and, in 1178, he witnessed Henry's charter to Waltham Abbey. But, during the King's struggles with his sons, when he imprisoned a number of magnates of whose loyalty he was doubtful, Earl William was among them.

== Family and children ==
He was married to Hawise de Beaumont of Leicester, daughter of Robert de Beaumont, 2nd Earl of Leicester and Amica de Gael and had children:

1. Robert fitz William (1151, Cardiff, Glamorganshire – 1166, Cardiff, Glamorganshire).
2. Mabel fitz William, married Amaury V de Montfort, her son Amaury briefly being Earl of Gloucester
3. Amice fitz William, d. 1220. Married Richard de Clare, 3rd Earl of Hertford, their descendants eventually inherited the Earldom of Gloucester.
4. Isabel, Countess of Gloucester. She was married three times:
  1. John of England
  2. Geoffrey FitzGeoffrey de Mandeville, 2nd Earl of Essex, Earl of Gloucester
  3. Hubert de Burgh, 1st Earl of Kent

The earl died in 1183; his wife Hawise survived him. Since their only son, Robert, predeceased his father, their daughters became co-heirs to the feudal barony of Gloucester.

== Sources ==
- Crouch, David (1 October 1999). "Robert of Gloucester's Mother and Sexual Politics in Norman Oxfordshire". Historical Research. 72 (179): 323–333. doi:10.1111/1468-2281.00087.

== Notes ==
- William Lord of Glamorgan was also known as Robert de Wintona according to records found in English historical ledgers.

Peerage of England
Preceded by Robert	Earl of Gloucester; 1147–1183	Succeeded by Isabella
