= John FitzJohn =

13th century English nobleman

- Arms of John FitzJohn. Quarterly, or and gules, a border vair.
- Died: 1275
- Father: John Fitzgeoffrey
- Mother: Isabel Bigod

John FitzJohn (died 1275) was an English nobleman who was a leading baron during the Second Barons' War.

== Biography ==
Fitz-John was the eldest son of John Fitzgeoffrey and Isabel Bigod.

John married Margery, daughter of Philip Basset and his wife Hawise de Lovaine. During 1263, FitzJohn joined the baronial revolt led by Simon de Montfort, Earl of Leicester. He was a leader of a division of the baronial army at the Battle of Lewes. After the battle he marched with Montfort towards Wales, reducing Richard's Castle and Ludlow Castle. He was subsequently appointed by the rebel barons, Sheriff of Westmorland, keeper of the castles in Westmorland and governor of Windsor Castle. FitzJohn was later captured at the Battle of Evesham and was imprisoned. FitzJohn was forfeited of his lands, with King Henry III of England granting them to Gilbert de Clare, Earl of Gloucester. FitzJohn was able to recover his lands afterwards under the "dictum of Kenilworth".

FitzJohn died in 1275, without issue, and was succeeded by his brother Richard.
