= Roger de Clare, 2nd Earl of Hertford =

12th-century English nobleman

Roger de Clare
- 2nd Earl of Hertford; 5th Lord of Clare

Hereditary
- Earl of Hereford Lord of Clare: 1152–1173 1152–1173
- Predecessor: Gilbert de Clare, 1st Earl of Hertford
- Successor: Richard de Clare
- Other titles: 5th Lord of Tonbridge; 4th Lord of Cardigan
- Born: 1116; Tonbridge Castle, Kent, England
- Died: 1173 (aged 56–57); Oxfordshire, England
- Buried: Tonbridge Priory
- Family: de Clare
- Spouse: Maud de St. Hilary
- Issue: Mabel de Clare; Richard de Clare; James de Clare; Eveline (Aveline) de Clare; Roger de Clare; John de Clare; Henry de Clare; Elena de Clare
- Father: Richard Fitz Gilbert de Clare
- Mother: Alice de Gernon
- Occupation: Peerage of England

Roger de Clare, 2nd Earl of Hertford, 5th Lord of Clare, 5th Lord of Tonbridge, 5th Lord of Cardigan (1116–1173) was a powerful Anglo-Norman noble in 12th-century England. He succeeded to the Earldom of Hertford and Honor of Clare, Tonbridge and Cardigan when his brother Gilbert died without issue.

== Life ==
Roger was a son of Richard Fitz Gilbert de Clare and Alice de Gernon. In 1153, he appears with his cousin, Richard Strongbow, Earl of Pembroke, as one of the signatories to the Treaty of Wallingford, in which Stephen recognises Henry of Anjou as his successor.

Roger is found signing charters at Canterbury and Dover in 1156. Next year, according to Powell, he received from Henry II a grant of whatever lands he could conquer in South Wales. This is probably only an expansion of the statement of the Welsh chronicles that in this year (about 1 June) he entered Cardigan and 'stored' the castles of Humfrey, Aberdyfi, Dineir, and Rhystud. Rhys ap Gruffydd, the prince of South Wales, appears to have complained to Henry II of these encroachments; but being unable to obtain redress from the king of England sent his nephew Einion ab Anarawd to attack Humfrey and the other Norman fortresses. The 'Annales Cambriæ seem to assign these events to the year 1159; and the 'Brut' adds that Prince Rhys burnt all the French castles in Cardigan.

In 1158 or 1160, Roger advanced with an army to the relief of Carmarthen Castle, then besieged by Rhys, and pitched his camp at Dinweilir. Not daring to attack the Welsh prince, the English army offered peace and retired home. In 1163, Rhys again invaded the conquests of Clare, who had at some earlier period caused Einion, the capturer of Humfrey Castle, to be murdered by domestic treachery. In 1164 he assisted with the Constitutions of Clarendon. From his munificence to the Church and his numerous acts of piety, Roger was called the "Good Earl of Hertford". (Note: There is a first school, Roger de Clare School, in the village of Puckeridge, Hertfordshire, named after Roger de Clare.) He was the founder of Little Marcis Nunnery prior to 1163.

A second time all Cardigan was wrested from the Norman hands; and things now wore so threatening an aspect that Henry II led an army into Wales in 1165, although, according to one Welsh account, Rhys had made his peace with the king in 1164, and had even visited him in England. The causes assigned by the Welsh chronicle for this fresh outbreak of hostility are that Henry failed to keep his promises – presumably of restitution – and secondly that Roger, earl of Clare, was honourably receiving Walter, the murderer of Rhys's nephew Einion. For the third time it is shown that Cardigan was overrun and the Norman castles burnt; but it is possible that the events assigned by the 'Annales Cambræ' to the year 1165 are the same as those assigned by the 'Brut y Tywysogion' to 1163.

In the intervening years, Roger had been abroad, and is found signing charters at Le Mans, probably about Christmas 1160, and again at Rouen in 1161. In July 1163 he was summoned by Thomas Becket to do homage in his capacity of steward to the archbishops of Canterbury for the castle of Tonbridge. In his refusal, which he based on the grounds that he held the castle of the king and not of the archbishop, he was supported by Henry II. Next year he was one of the "recognisers" of the Constitutions of Clarendon. Early in 1170 he was appointed one of a band of commissioners for Kent, Surrey, and other arts of southern England. His last known signature seems to belong to June or July 1171, and is dated abroad from Chevaillée.He appears to have died in 1173, and certainly before July or August 1174, when Richard, earl of Clare, his son, went to the king at Northampton.

== Family ==
Roger married Matilda (or Maud) de St. Hilary, daughter of Jean or James de St. Hilary and Aveline, later married to William d'Aubigny, 2nd Earl of Arundel. Together they had eight children:

- Mabel de Clare, d. 1204, m. (c. 1175), Nigel de Mowbray.
- Richard de Clare, b. c. 1153, Tonbridge Castle, Kent, England, d. 28 November 1217, 3rd Earl of Hertford
- James de Clare
- Eveline (Aveline) de Clare, d. 4 June 1225, m. [1] (c. 1204), Geoffrey IV Fitz Piers (Fitz Peter), 1st Earl of Essex. m. [2] Sir William Munchensy, (b. c. 1184), son of Warin de Munchensy and Agnes Fitz John.
- Roger de Clare, d. 1241, Middleton, Norfolk, England, m. Alix de Dammartin-en-Goële.
- John de Clare
- Henry de Clare
- Elena de Clare, married John de Grey, 2x Gt Grandson of Anschetil de Grey, Domesday Baron.

== Notes ==
Peerage of England
Preceded by Gilbert de Clare	Earl of Hertford; 1152–1173	Succeeded by Richard de Clare
