= William FitzGeoffrey de Mandeville, 3rd Earl of Essex =

Earl of Essex

William de Mandeville
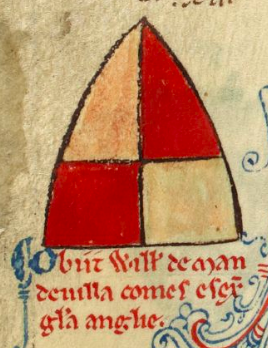
- Inverted shield with the arms of William de Mandeville, count of Essex, indicating his death
- Died: 8 January 1227
- Spouse: Christina filia Robert
- Father: Geoffrey Fitz Peter, 1st Earl of Essex
- Mother: Beatrice de Say

William FitzGeoffrey de Mandeville (died 1227) was the third Earl of Essex of the second creation from either 1219 or 1216 until his death. He was the second son of Geoffrey Fitz Peter and Beatrice de Say and he succeeded his elder brother Geoffrey FitzGeoffrey as earl and inheritor of the Mandeville earldom and barony. His brother had been a Magna Charta Surety and he was also an ardent supporter of the baronial cause. During the barons war he laid siege to Berkhamsted castle in the month of December 1216, attempting to take it from the castellan Waleran the German. Waleran sallied out when de Mandeville was setting up camp and was able to capture a large amount of de Mandeville's Baggage.and Standard (flag). Later, upon the arrival of Louis VIII of France, the castle was captured on 20 December 1216. He must have reconciled with the royal government of Henry III because by 1220 he complained to the royal administration that his market rights in the town of Moretonhampstead were being infringed upon by Hugh de Chaggeford who was the lord of Chagford which held its own market. In the following court case William's lawyer argued Hugh's market was not a real market but simply a wake where bread and ale were sold but Hugh claimed that his market had been in existence and involved the collection of toll and stallage for one hundred years. The outcome of the case is unknown but there isn't any indication that de Chagford's event was disbanded. He was married to Christina, one of Robert FitzWalter's daughters, but died on 8 January 1227, without heirs and the earldom became extinct.

== Citations ==
Peerage of England
Preceded by Geoffrey FitzGeoffrey	Earl of Essex; 1219-1227	Extinct
