= Isabella, Countess of Gloucester =

English noblewoman, first wife of King John

Isabella
- Countess of Gloucester and Essex
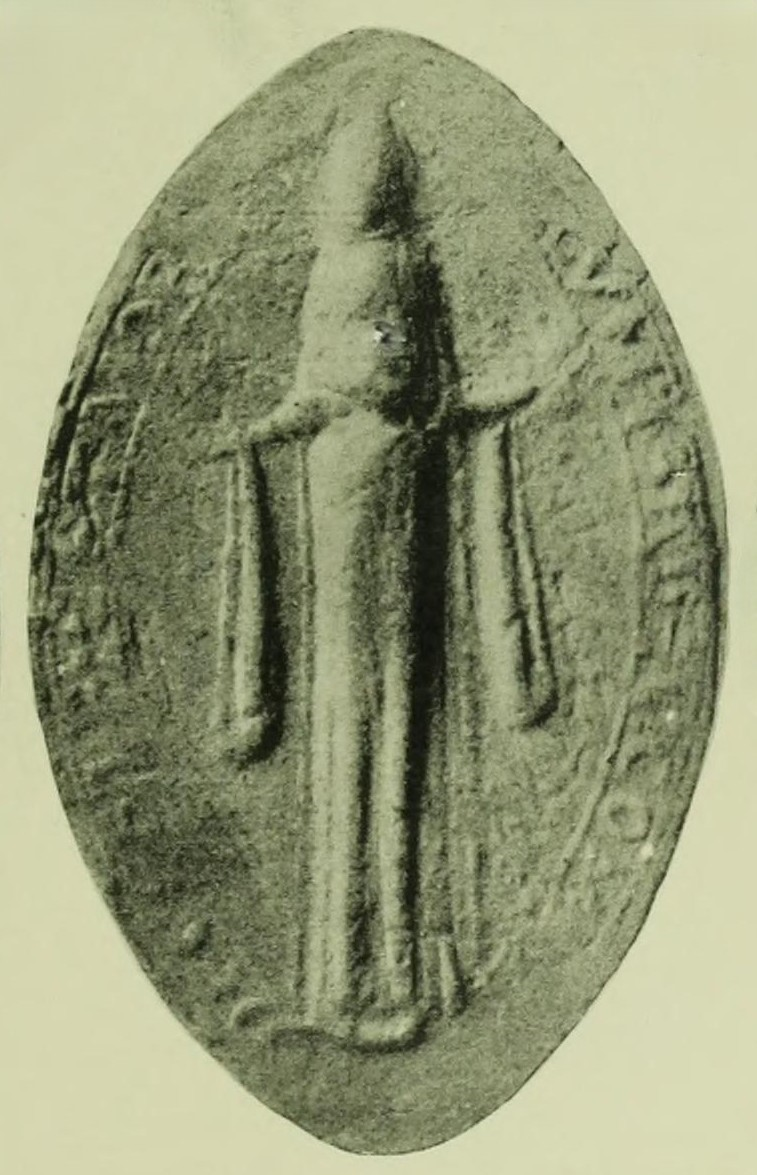
- Seal of Isabella, Countess of Gloucester

English royal consort
- Tenure: 27 May 1199 – Spring 1200
- Born: c. 1160–1166
- Died: October 1217
- Burial: unknown
- Spouses: John, King of England (m. 1189; ann. 1200) Geoffrey FitzGeoffrey de Mandeville, 2nd Earl of Essex (m. 1214; died 1216) Hubert de Burgh (m. 1217)
- Father: William Fitz Robert, 2nd Earl of Gloucester
- Mother: Hawise of Leicester

Isabella, Countess of Gloucester (c. 1160–1166 – October 1217), was an Anglo-Norman noblewoman who was the first wife of King John of England.

== Lineage and family ==
Isabella was the youngest surviving daughter of William Fitz Robert, 2nd Earl of Gloucester, and his wife Hawise de Beaumont, daughter of Robert de Beaumont, Earl of Leicester. From him she inherited the cross-channel holdings of the earldom of Gloucester. Her paternal grandfather, Robert, 1st Earl of Gloucester, was the illegitimate son of King Henry I. Isabella's brother, Robert, died in 1166, and with her elder sisters Mabel and Amice fitz William, she became co-heir to the honor of Gloucester. Mabel married Amaury III, Count of Évreux, and Amice became the wife of Richard de Clare, 3rd Earl of Hertford

== Betrothal and marriage ==
After a series of disputes between Isabella's father William, Earl of Gloucester and Henry II, in September 1176, William attempted to regain favour with the King and secure the future of the earldom. In a politically difficult position, William agreed to a betrothal between Isabella and John, Henry and Eleanor of Aquitaine's youngest son. As part of the settlement, William agreed that John would be recognised as his heir, and even if William and his wife, Hawise were to have another male child, John would become a co-heir and receive half the Gloucester estates on William's death.

Earl William died in 1183, at which point Henry II nominated Isabella as the sole heir to the earldom, and made her his ward. Wardship meant that Henry completely controlled her lands, revenues and resources, and while he could have married her to John, he chose to keep Isabella's holdings for himself.

Following Richard I's accession in July 1189, Isabella was removed from royal wardship and was married to John on 29 August at Marlborough Castle. Isabella and John were related within the third degree of consanguinity, meaning they both shared the same great-grandfather (Henry I). This order of relationship was prohibited by the Church, and in order to marry they should have gained a special dispensation from the pope. However, this did not happen, and when he learnt of their marriage, the Archbishop of Canterbury, Baldwin of Forde, placed John under interdict and forbade him from seeing Isabella. Ultimately, the interdict was removed by the papal legate John of Agnani, but permission for the marriage was never officially given.

In May 1199, John was crowned and anointed King of England, but Isabella was not at his side; thus putting her in the precarious position of being only a consort, rather than a queen. By the Spring of 1200, John had been granted permission to have their marriage annulled and a divorce on the grounds of consanguinity was granted by bishops in both Normandy and Aquitaine.

== Earldom of Gloucester ==
After the annulment, John retained custody of all Isabella's lands, and she returned to a position of wardship where John was free to do with her, and her lands as he wished. He often sent her presents of wine and cloth. John granted the title of Earl of Gloucester to Isabella's nephew Amaury, count of Évreux. This compensated Amaury for the loss of his French title, which was surrendered in the Treaty of Le Goulet. Upon his death without issue in 1213, Isabella once again became Countess of Gloucester.

== Later marriages ==
By January 1214, Isabella had been married by King John to Geoffrey FitzGeoffrey de Mandeville, 2nd Earl of Essex. For this privilege, Geoffrey agreed to pay the enormous sum of 20,000 marks (in instalments). In 1215, the couple were part of the rebellion against King John, and records shows her active with her husband in London during this period. On 23 February 1216 Geoffrey was killed in an accident during a tournament in the city. Having had her lands confiscated by the crown, Isabella remained active during the period of the civil war, with her lands eventually being awarded to Hubert de Burgh in August of 1217. Hubert only held the lands for a month, as in September 1217 Henry III accepted Isabella's offer of fidelity and returned her holdings. It is unclear what happened, but shortly after this event, Isabella and Hubert were married.

== Death and burial ==
Isabella died on 14 October 1217, just a month after her third marriage, probably at Keynsham Abbey in Somerset, which had been founded by her father in memory of her brother, Robert. Although remembered in the obituary lists for Canterbury Cathedral, her burial place is unknown. It seems likely that she was interred at Keynsham.

== Fictional portrayals ==
- A very fanciful depiction of her as a witch appears in The Devil and King John, a historical novel by Philip Lindsay, where she is called Hadwisa. In his introduction, Lindsay acknowledged that he had no evidence that she was a witch, but for the purposes of his plot, he needed to provide a link between John and witchcraft.
- She appears as the character Hadwisa in Robin of Sherwood, played by Patricia Hodge.
- She appears as character Avice in The Adventures of Robin Hood episode "Isabella" played by Helen Cherry.
- Jessica Raine plays her in the 2010 film Robin Hood.
- Featured briefly as Avisa in Virginia Henley's The Falcon and the Flower.
- Appears as Isobel in Roberta Gellis' historical romance novel Roselynde.
- Appears in Maureen Peters' historical novel Lackland's Bride.
- Appears as Avisa in Sharon Kay Penman's historical novel Here Be Dragons.
- Appears as Avisa in Erica Laine's historical novel Isabella of Angouleme: the Tangled Queen Part One
- Appears as Hadwisa in Jean Plaidy’s historical novel “The Prince of Darkness”.

Peerage of England
Preceded by William Fitz Robert	Countess of Gloucester; 1183–1199	Succeeded by Amaury de Montfort
Preceded by Amaury de Montfort	Countess of Gloucester; 1213–1217	Succeeded by Gilbert de Clare
