= Richard Sturgis Seymour =

Richard Sturgis Seymour, MVO (21 September 1875 – 21 April 1959) was a British diplomat who served as British Minister to Siam and to Bolivia.

A member of the Seymour family, Richard Seymour was the son of Colonel Leopold Seymour and the grandson of the diplomat Sir George Hamilton Seymour. The courtier Sir Edward Seymour was his brother. Seymour was educated at Eton College and Magdalen College, Oxford, and abroad.

Seymour entered HM Diplomatic Service in 1898 and served at Berlin, Paris, Teheran, Vienna, St Petersburg, and Copenhagen. He was Secretary of Legation at The Hague from 1915 to 1918, British Minister to Siam from 1919 to 1924 and British Minister to Bolivia from 1924 to 1926.

A poet, Seymour published Rhyme Unreasoned (1938), Shaded Candles (1939), The Marionettes, and Selected Poems: Afterthoughts.

== Family ==
Seymour married in 1911 Lady Victoria Alexandrina Mabel FitzRoy (died 1969), daughter of the Rev. Lord Charles Edward FitzRoy, son of Augustus FitzRoy, 7th Duke of Grafton, and a goddaughter of Queen Victoria; they had two sons and a daughter. George Fitzroy Seymour, sometime High Sheriff of Nottinghamshire, was Seymour's son; the writer Miranda Seymour is his granddaughter.
