= Geoffrey Fitz Peter, 1st Earl of Essex =

English Earl of Essex (c. 1162–1213)

Geoffrey Fitz Peter

Chief Justiciar of England
- In office 11 July 1198 – 14 October 1213
- Monarchs: Richard I John
- Preceded by: Hubert Walter
- Succeeded by: Peter des Roches

Justiciar of England
- In office 1189 – 11 July 1198
- Monarch: Richard I

Sheriff of Northamptonshire
- In office 1184–1189
- Monarch: Henry II

Personal details
- Born: c. 1162
- Died: 14 October 1213
- Spouse(s): (1) Beatrice de Say (2) Aveline de Clare
- Children: Geoffrey de Mandeville; William de Mandeville; Henry, Dean of Wolverhampton; Maud Fitzgeoffrey; John Fitzgeoffrey; Cecily Fitzgeoffrey; Hawise Fitzgeoffrey
- Parent: Piers de Lutegareshale (father)
- Occupation: Earl of Essex
- Profession: Noble

Geoffrey Fitz Peter, Earl of Essex (c. 1162–1213) was a prominent member of the government of England during the reigns of Richard I and John. The patronymic is sometimes rendered Fitz Piers, for he was the son of Piers de Lutegareshale (born 1134, Cherhill, Wiltshire, died 14 January 1179, Pleshy, Essex), a forester of Ludgershall, and Maud.

== Life ==
Geoffrey was from a modest landowning family that had a tradition of service in mid-ranking posts under Henry II. Geoffrey's elder brother, Simon Fitz Peter, was at various times High Sheriff of Northamptonshire, Buckinghamshire, and Bedfordshire. Geoffrey, too, got his start in this way, as High Sheriff of Northamptonshire for the last five years of Henry II's reign.

Around this time Geoffrey married Beatrice de Say, daughter and eventual co-heiress of William de Say II. This William was the elder son of William de Say I and Beatrice, sister of Geoffrey de Mandeville, 1st Earl of Essex. This connection with the Mandeville family was later to prove unexpectedly important. In 1184, Geoffrey's father-in-law died, and he received a share of the de Say inheritance by right of his wife, co-heiress to her father. He also eventually gained the title of earl of Essex by right of his wife, becoming the 4th earl.

When Richard I left on crusade, he appointed Geoffrey one of the five judges of the king's court, and thus a principal advisor to Hugh de Puiset, Bishop of Durham, who, as Chief Justiciar, was one of the regents during the king's absence. Late in 1189, Geoffrey's wife's cousin William de Mandeville, 3rd Earl of Essex died, leaving no direct heirs. His wife's inheritance was disputed between Geoffrey and Beatrice's uncle, Geoffrey de Say, but Geoffrey Fitz Peter used his political influence to eventually obtain the Mandeville lands (although not the earldom, which was left open) for himself.

Geoffrey served as Constable of the Tower of London from 1198 to 1205. He served as High Sheriff of Yorkshire from 1198 to 1201, and again in 1203, and as High Sheriff of Bedfordshire and Buckinghamshire from 1200 to 1205.

On 11 July 1198, King Richard appointed Geoffrey Chief Justiciar, which at that time effectively made him the king's principal minister. On his coronation day the new king ennobled Geoffrey as Earl of Essex.

King John granted Berkhamsted Castle to Geoffrey; the castle had previously been granted as a jointure palace to Queen Isabel prior to the annulment of the royal marriage. Geoffrey founded two hospitals in Berkhamsted, one dedicated to St John the Baptist and one to St John the Evangelist; the latter is still commemorated in the town with the name St John's Well Lane.

After the accession of King John, Geoffrey continued in his capacity as the king's principal minister until his death on 14 October 1213.

== Marriage and issue ==
=== Spouses ===
His first wife was Beatrice de Say, daughter of William de Say and heiress of the Mandeville Earls of Essex. His second wife was Aveline de Clare, daughter of Roger de Clare, 2nd Earl of Hertford.

=== Children of Beatrice ===
Geoffrey's sons by this marriage used the de Mandeville surname.

- Geoffrey FitzGeoffrey de Mandeville, 2nd Earl of Essex.
- William FitzGeoffrey de Mandeville, 3rd Earl of Essex.
- Henry Fitz Geoffrey, Dean of Wolverhampton.
- Maud Fitzgeoffrey, who married Henry de Bohun, 1st Earl of Hereford.

=== Children of Aveline ===
- John Fitzgeoffrey, Lord of Shere and Justiciar of Ireland.
- Cecily Fitzgeoffrey.
- Hawise Fitzgeoffrey.

Geoffrey's first two sons died without male issue. The earldom had been associated with their mother's Mandeville heritage, and the earldom was next granted to the son of their sister Maud and her husband Henry De Bohun instead of their half-brother John.

== Notes ==
Political offices
Preceded by Hubert Walter	Chief Justiciar; 1198–1213	Succeeded by Peter des Roches
Preceded by William d'Aubigny	High Sheriff of Bedfordshire and Buckinghamshire; 1199–1204	Succeeded by Robert of Braybrooke; Robert Fitz Hemeri
Peerage of England
New creation	Earl of Essex; 1199–1213	Succeeded by Geoffrey FitzGeoffrey de Mandeville
