= Geoffrey FitzGeoffrey de Mandeville, 2nd Earl of Essex =

English noble

Geoffrey de Mandeville
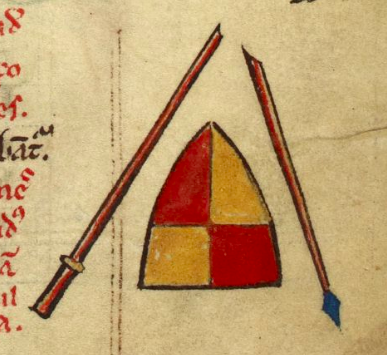
- Inverted arms of Geoffrey De Mandeville with a broken lance, symbolizing his death and excommunication
- Born: c. 1191
- Died: 23 February 1216
- Spouses: 1. Matilda filia Robert; 2. Isabel of Gloucester
- Father: Geoffrey Fitz Peter, 1st Earl of Essex
- Mother: Beatrice de Say

Geoffrey de Mandeville, 2nd Earl of Essex and 4th Earl of Gloucester (c. 1191 – 23 February 1216) was an English peer. He was an opponent of King John and one of the sureties of the Magna Carta.

Geoffrey and his brother took the surname Mandeville because of the lineage of their mother, Beatrice de Say, who was a granddaughter of Beatrice de Mandeville, the sister of Geoffrey de Mandeville, Earl of Essex (d. 1144). The elder Beatrice inherited the Mandeville honour in 1189, on the death of her nephew William de Mandeville, 3rd Earl of Essex. Richard I of England allowed her lands and the earldom to pass to her granddaughter's husband Geoffrey Fitz Peter. Their eldest son, Geoffrey, inherited the earldom of Essex from his father in 1213.

His first marriage was to Matilda, daughter of Robert Fitzwalter, a member of the Clare family and one of the leaders of the opposition to King John. She died childless.

In 1214, the new earl gained the earldom of Gloucester and much of the honour by right of marriage to Isabel of Gloucester. He was Isabel's second husband, her marriage to John of England having been annulled many years earlier. The king charged Geoffrey 20,000 marks, an unprecedented amount, for her marriage and inheritance.

On his death, in a tournament in February 1216, Geoffrey was succeeded by his brother William FitzGeoffrey de Mandeville, 3rd Earl of Essex. His widow Isabel was remarried to Hubert de Burgh, 1st Earl of Kent but died within weeks of the wedding.

Peerage of England
| Preceded by Geoffrey Fitz Peter | Earl of Essex; 1213-1216 | Succeeded by William de Mandeville |
| Preceded by Amaury IV of Évreux | Earl of Gloucester; 1214-1216 | Succeeded by Isabel of Gloucester |
