= George FitzRoy Seymour =

George Fitzroy Seymour DL (8 February 1923 – 12 May 1994) was High Sheriff of Nottinghamshire in 1966 and Deputy Lieutenant of Nottinghamshire.

== Early life ==
Seymour was born at Witley on 8 February 1923. He was the son of Richard Sturgis Seymour and Lady Victoria Alexandrina Mabel FitzRoy, daughter of the Rev. Lord Charles Edward FitzRoy, son of Augustus FitzRoy, 7th Duke of Grafton, and a goddaughter of Queen Victoria.

He was educated at Winchester College.

== Career ==
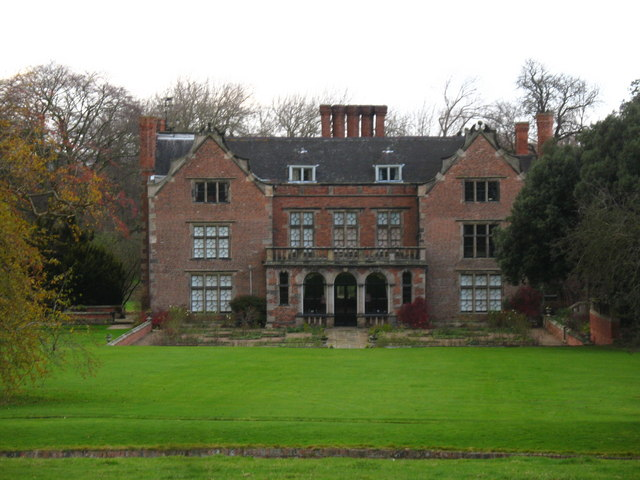
Thrumpton Hall

He fought in the Second World War between 1941 and 1942, with the King's Royal Rifle Corps (60th Rifles), and was invalided.

He held the office of High Sheriff of Nottinghamshire for 1966–67. He was a Justice of the Peace for Nottinghamshire for over 30 years. He had been the longest-serving member on the Council of the Magistrates' Association and between 1975 and 1978 he served as chairman of the association's Juvenile Courts Committee. He also held the office of Deputy Lieutenant of Nottinghamshire.

He was a great supporter, benefactor and President of Thrumpton Village Cricket club from 1949. He was also a member of Nottinghamshire County Cricket Club and Marylebone Cricket Club, but the village club enjoyed much of his time amidst a wide variety of public duties. When the Thrumpton club lost its ground on Church Lane at the end of 1967, he offered the use of his park and since 1968 the ground has been one of the most picturesque in the County.

=== Thrumpton Hall ===
He spent much of his life working for the preservation of Thrumpton Hall, his home in Thrumpton, Nottinghamshire. He had moved here when he was one, in 1924. His diplomat father had been posted to La Paz in Bolivia and George's mother went too. Her brother-in-law was the 10th Lord Byron. Although he moved back to his family when they returned to London 18 months later, he spent his holidays here. At the age of 13, he was writing school essays about life as a squire – or a squarson.

After his uncle's death in 1949, with heavy death-duties Seymour was compelled to buy the house he had expected to inherit and, in a country auction, as many of its contents as he could afford. He borrowed £50,000, (equivalent to £2,231,331 as of 2023) and by selling the majority of the estate, paid it back within the year.

== Personal life ==
He married Hon. Rosemary Nest Scott-Ellis, daughter of Thomas Scott-Ellis, 8th Baron Howard de Walden and Margherita van Raalte, on 1 June 1946. This marriage produced two children

- Miranda Jane Seymour (b. 8 Aug 1948)
- Thomas Oliver Seymour (b. 20 Oct 1952)

Seymour died at Thrumpton on 12 May 1994.

=== Legacy ===
He is posthumously the subject of the book Thrumpton Hall: A Memoir of Life in My Father’s House written by his daughter, Miranda Seymour.
