= Richard Fitz Gilbert de Clare =

Norman nobleman (died 1136)

Richard Fitz Gilbert
- Earl of Brionne; Earl of Hertford; 3rd feudal baron of Clare, 3rd Lord of Tonbridge; Lord of Cardigan

Hereditary
- Lord of the Honor of Clare: 1117–1136
- Predecessor: Gilbert Fitz Richard
- Successor: Gilbert de Clare, 1st Earl of Hertford
- Born: Clare, Suffolk, England
- Died: 15 April 1136; Abergavenny, Monmouthshire
- Family: de Clare
- Spouse: Alice de Gernon
- Issue: Gilbert Fitz Richard de Clare; Roger de Clare; Alice de Clare; Robert Fitz Richard de Clare; Rohese de Clare; Lucy de Clare
- Father: Gilbert Fitz Richard
- Mother: Adeliza de Claremont

Richard fitz Gilbert de Clare (died 15 April 1136) 3rd feudal baron of Clare in Suffolk, was an Anglo-Norman nobleman. A marcher lord in Wales, he was also the founder of Tonbridge Priory in Kent.

== Life ==
Richard was the eldest son of Gilbert Fitz Richard de Clare and Adeliza de Claremont. Upon his father's death, he inherited his lands in England and Wales.

Richard is commonly said to have been created Earl of Hertford by either Henry I or Stephen, but no contemporary reference to him, including the record of his death, calls him by any title, while a cartulary states that a tenant had held "de Gilleberto, filio Richardi, et de Ricardo, filio ejus, et postea, de Comite Gilleberto, filio Richardi" ("of Gilbert Fitz Richard, and his son Richard, and then of Earl Gilbert Fitz Richard"), again failing to call Richard 'Earl' while giving that title to his son. Thus, his supposed creation as earl is without merit, although his status and wealth made him a great magnate in England.

Directly following the death of Henry I, hostilities increased significantly in Wales, and a rebellion broke out. Richard was a strong supporter of King Stephen and in the first two years of his reign Richard attested a total of twenty-nine of that king's charters. He was with King Stephen when he formalized a treaty with King David I of Scotland and was a royal steward at Stephen's great Easter court in 1136. He was also with Stephen at the siege of Exeter that summer and was in attendance on the king on his return from Normandy. At this point, Richard apparently demanded more land in Wales, which Stephen was not willing to give him.

In 1136, Richard had been away from his lordship in the early part of the year. He returned to the borders of Wales via Hereford in the company of Brian Fitz Count, but on their separating, Richard ignored warnings of the danger and pressed on toward Ceredigion with only a small force. He had not gone far when, on 15 April, he was ambushed and killed by the men of Gwent under Iorwerth ab Owain and his brother Morgan, grandsons of Caradog ap Gruffydd, in a woody tract called "the ill-way of Coed Grano", near Llanthony Abbey, north of Abergavenny. Today the spot is marked by the 'garreg dial' (the stone of revenge). He was buried in Tonbridge Priory, which he founded.

== Aftermath ==
The news of Richard's death induced Owain Gwynedd, son of Gruffudd ap Cynan, king of Gwynedd to invade his lordship. In alliance with Gruffydd ap Rhys of Deheubarth, he won a crushing victory over the Normans at the Battle of Crug Mawr, just outside Cardigan. The town of Cardigan was taken and burnt, and Richard's widow, Alice, took refuge in Cardigan Castle, which was successfully defended by Robert fitz Martin. She was rescued by Miles of Gloucester, who led an expedition to bring her to safety in England.

== Family ==
Richard married Alice, sister of Ranulf de Gernon, 4th Earl of Chester, and they had the following children:

- Gilbert Fitz Richard de Clare, d. 1153 (without issue), 1st Earl of Hertford.
- Roger de Clare, d. 1173, 2nd Earl of Hertford.
- Alice de Clare (Adelize de Tonbridge), m. (1) about 1133, Sir William de Percy, Lord of Topcliffe, (2) Cadwaladr ap Gruffydd
- Robert Fitz Richard de Clare, perhaps died in childhood
- Rohese de Clare, m. Gilbert de Gant, Earl of Lincoln.
- Lucy de Clare, m. Baldwin de Redvers, 1st Earl of Devon.

== Sources ==
- Round, John Horace (1887). "Clare, Richard de (d.1136?)" . In Stephen, Leslie (ed.). Dictionary of National Biography. Vol. 10. London: Smith, Elder & Co.
- White, Graeme J. (2016). "The Legacy of Ranulf de Gernons". In Dalton, Paul; Luscombe, David (eds.). Rulership and Rebellion in the Anglo-Norman World, C.1066–c.1216: Essays in Honour of Professor Edmund King. Routledge.
