= Richard de Clare, 3rd Earl of Hertford =

Anglo-Norman nobleman and Welsh baron

Richard de Clare
- Arms of the de Clare family, adopted at the start of the age of heraldry c.1200–1215

3rd Earl of Hertford
- Tenure: 1173–1217
- Predecessor: Roger de Clare, 2nd Earl of Hertford
- Successor: Gilbert de Clare
- Other titles: 6th Lord of Tonbridge; 5th Lord of Cardigan
- Born: 1153; Tonbridge Castle, Kent, England
- Died: 1217 (aged 63–64)
- Buried: Tonbridge Priory
- Family: de Clare
- Spouse: Amice FitzWilliam, suo jure 4th Countess of Gloucester
- Issue: Gilbert de Clare; Maud de Clare; Richard de Clare
- Father: Roger de Clare, 2nd Earl of Hertford
- Mother: Maud de St. Hillary
- Occupation: Peerage of England

Richard de Clare, 3rd Earl of Hertford (c. 1153–1217), feudal baron of Clare in Suffolk, and lord of Tonbridge in Kent and of Cardigan in Wales, was a powerful Anglo-Norman nobleman with vast landholdings in England and Wales.

== Career ==
Richard was the son and heir of Roger de Clare, 2nd Earl of Hertford, 5th feudal baron of Clare, by his wife Maud de St Hillary, a daughter of James de St Hillary. More commonly known as the Earl of Clare, he had the majority of the Giffard estates from his ancestor, Rohese. He was present at the coronations of kingsRichard I at Westminster, 3 September 1189, and John on 27 May 1199. He was also present at the homage of King William of Scotland as English Earl of Huntingdon at Lincoln.

== Magna Carta ==
Richard sided with the Barons against King John, even though he had previously sworn peace with the King at Northampton, and his castle of Tonbridge was taken. He played a leading part in the negotiations for Magna Carta, being one of the twenty-five sureties. On 9 November 1215, he was one of the commissioners on the part of the Barons to negotiate the peace with the King. In 1215, his lands in counties Cambridge, Norfolk, Suffolk and Essex were granted to Robert de Betun. He and his son were among the Barons excommunicated by the Pope in 1215.

Richard's coat of arms was: Or, three chevronels gules, adopted at the start of the age of heraldry between 1200–1215, and certainly borne by his son, the Earl of Gloucester.

== Marriage and issue ==
In about 1172, Richard married Amice Fitzwilliam, 4th Countess of Gloucester (c. 1160–1220), the second daughter and co-heiress of William Fitz Robert, 2nd Earl of Gloucester by his wife Hawise de Beaumont. At some time before 1198, Earl Richard and his wife Amice were ordered to separate by the Pope on the grounds of consanguinity, but later apparently reconciled their marriage with the Pope's agreement. He and his wife had the following children:

- Gilbert de Clare (ca. 1180 – 25 October 1230), 4th Earl of Hertford and 5th Earl of Gloucester, (or 1st Earl of Gloucester of new creation). Married in 1217 Isabel Marshal.
- Maud de Clare (ca. 1184–1213), married in 1206, William de Braose
- Richard de Clare (ca. 1184 – 4 Mar 1228, London)
- Mathilde, married Rhys Gryg son of Rhys ap Gruffydd, ruler of the kingdom of Deheubarth.
- Hawise de Clare (1184–1235) married Geoffrey de Say

Peerage of England
Preceded by Roger de Clare	Earl of Hertford; 1173–1217	Succeeded by Gilbert de Clare
