= Earl of Gloucester =

English noble title

The title of Earl of Gloucester was created several times in the Peerage of England. A fictional earl is also a character in William Shakespeare's play King Lear.

== Earls of Gloucester, 1st Creation (1121) ==
- Robert, 1st Earl of Gloucester (1100–1147)
- William Fitz Robert, 2nd Earl of Gloucester (1121–1183)
- Isabel, 3rd Countess of Gloucester (d. 1217), her title and lands were held by her husbands jure uxoris:
  - John of England (1166–1216), married in 1189, on becoming king in 1199 he granted the Earldom to Isabel's nephew Amaury
  - Geoffrey FitzGeoffrey de Mandeville, 2nd Earl of Essex, Earl of Gloucester (d. 1216), married in 1214
  - Hubert de Burgh, Chief Justiciar of England (1170–1243), married in 1217
- Amaury VI of Montfort-Évreux, (d. 1213), 4th Earl of Gloucester, nephew of the 3rd Countess, on his death the title reverted to her
- Gilbert de Clare, 4th Earl of Hertford, 5th Earl of Gloucester (1180–1230), nephew of the 3rd Countess
- Richard de Clare, 5th Earl of Hertford, 6th Earl of Gloucester (1222–1262)
- Gilbert de Clare, 6th Earl of Hertford, 7th Earl of Gloucester (1243–1295)
- Gilbert de Clare, 7th Earl of Hertford, 8th Earl of Gloucester (1291–1314)

== Earls of Gloucester, 2nd Creation (1299) ==
- Ralph de Monthermer, 1st Baron Monthermer (d. 1325). He acquired Earldoms through marriage to Joan of Acre, the widow of the 7th Earl, and lost them on her death in 1307 by reversion to the 8th Earl.

== Earls of Gloucester, 3rd Creation (1337) ==
- Hugh de Audley, 1st Earl of Gloucester (d. 1347)

== Earls of Gloucester, 4th Creation (1397) ==
- Thomas le Despencer, 1st Earl of Gloucester (1373–1400), degraded 1399

== See also ==
- Duke of Gloucester
- Feudal barony of Gloucester
