= De Lacy =

Norman noble family

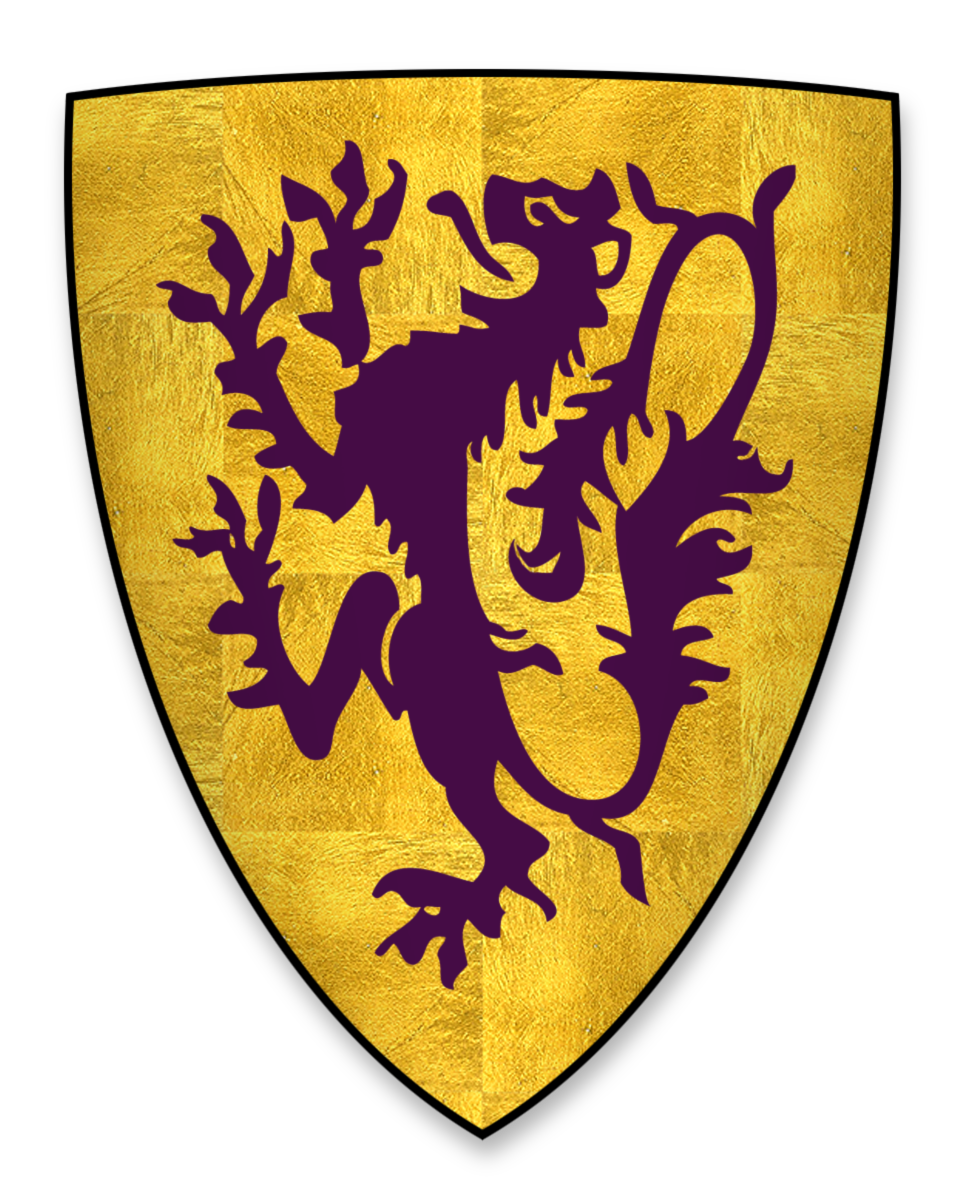
The Lacy arms

de Lacy (Laci, Lacie, Lascy, Lacey, Lassey) is the surname of an old Norman family which originated from Lassy, Calvados. The family took part in the Norman Conquest of England and the later Norman invasion of Ireland. The name is first recorded for Hugh de Lacy (1020–1085). His sons, Walter and Ilbert, left Normandy and travelled to England with William the Conqueror. The awards of land by the Conqueror to the de Lacy sons led to two distinct branches of the family: the northern branch, centred on Blackburnshire and West Yorkshire was held by Ilbert's descendants; the southern branch of Marcher Lords, centred on Herefordshire and Shropshire, was held by Walter's descendants.

Until 1361, the northern branch of the family held the great Lordship of Bowland before it passed through marriage to the Duchy of Lancaster. They were also Barons of Pontefract and later (via two female lines) Earls of Lincoln.

The southern branch of the family became substantial landholders in the Lordship of Ireland and was linked to the Scottish royal family; Elizabeth de Burgh, great-granddaughter of Walter de Lacy, married Robert the Bruce, King of Scotland.

== Lords of Pontefract, Bowland and Clitheroe ==
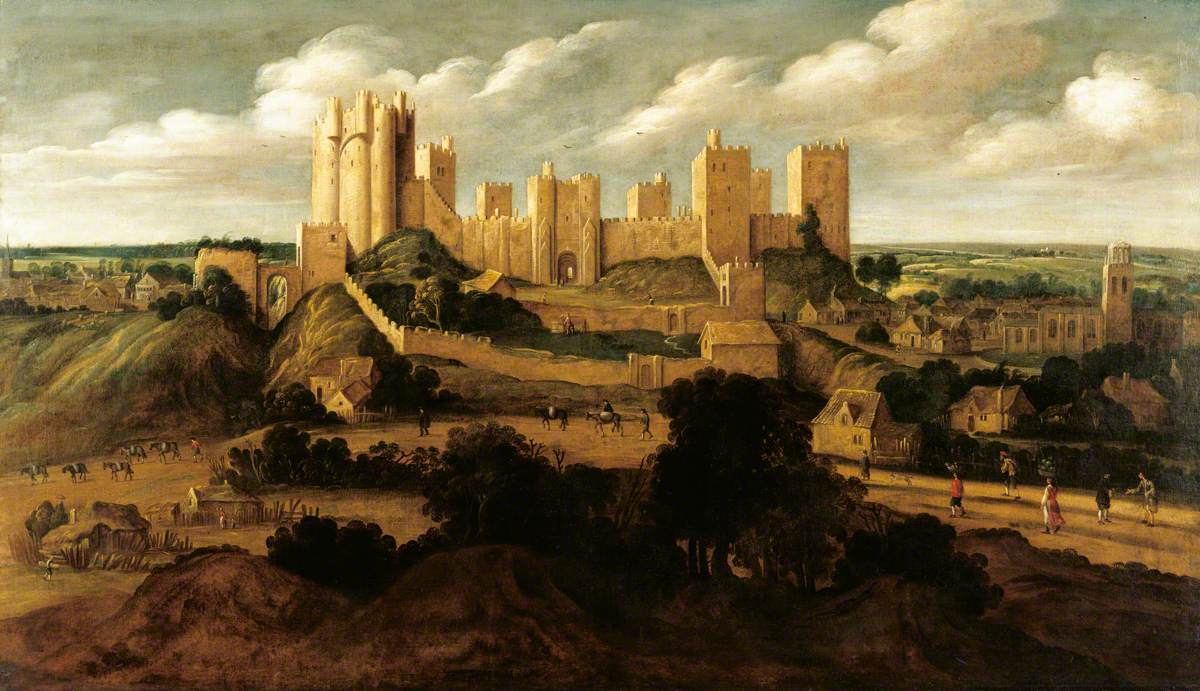
Pontefract Castle

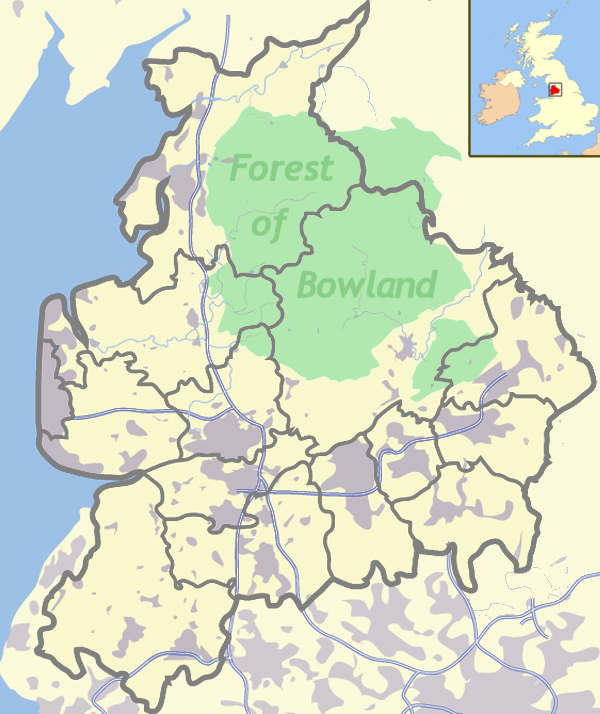
Bowland, northern England

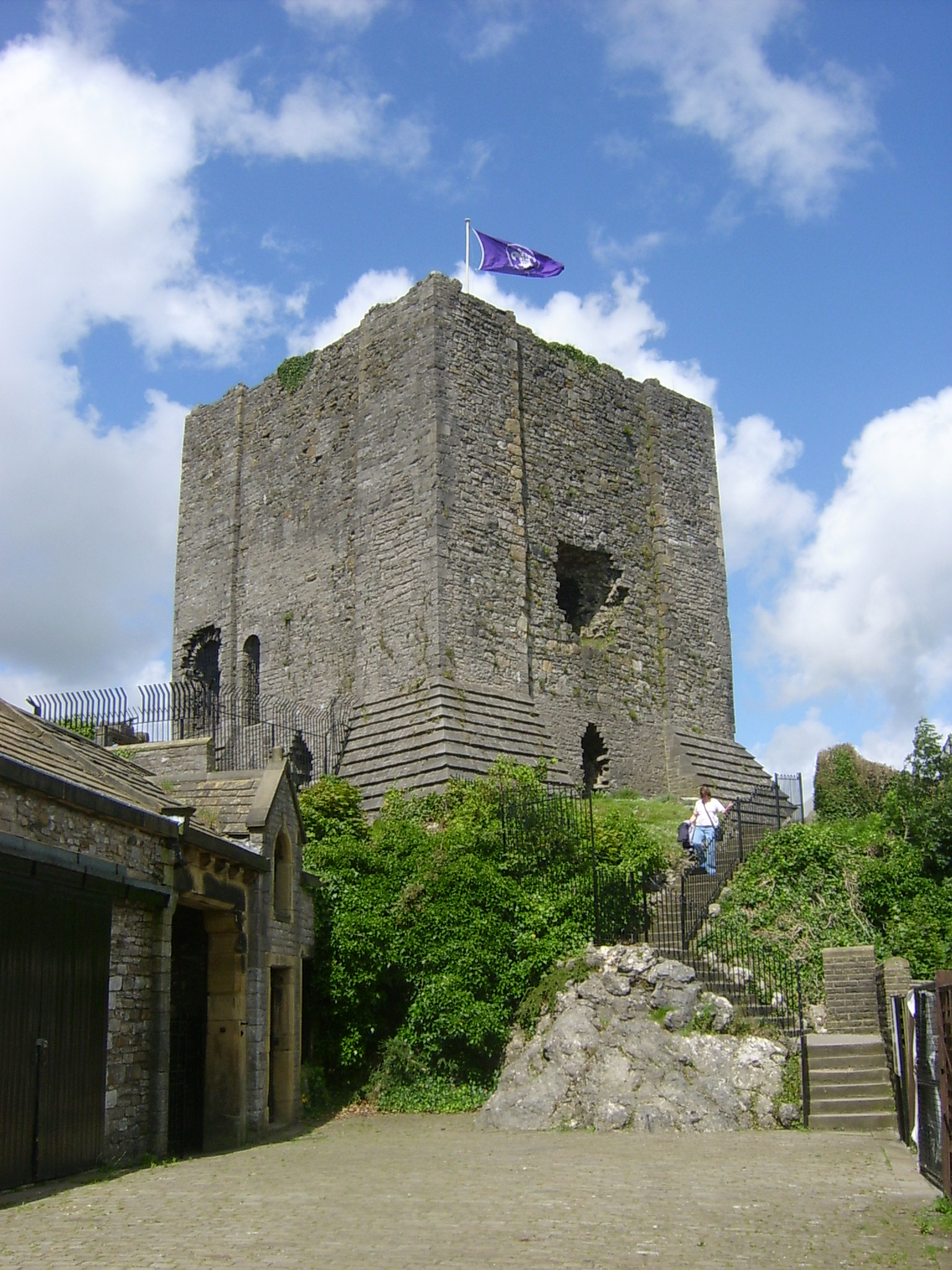
Clitheroe Castle, founded by Robert de Lacy

Brothers Ilbert and Walter de Lacy jointly held the Norman lands of the Bishop of Bayeux. They participated in the Norman conquest of England. While there is evidence that Ilbert fought at William's side at Hastings, there is no record of Walter fighting at Hastings. Ilbert was a major participant in the Harrying of the North (1069–70) which effectively ended the quasi-independence of the region through large-scale destruction that resulted in the relative "pacification" of the local population and the replacement of local Anglo-Danish lords with Normans. In return, he received vast grants of land in West Yorkshire, where he built Pontefract Castle.

The Honour of Pontefract, which included the manor of Stanbury, was maintained by Ilbert's direct male descendants for the next three generations until 1192. It continued in the female line until 1348.

Some of the English holdings lost by Roger the Poitevin due to his rebellion were awarded to Robert de Lacy, the son of Ilbert de Lacy. In 1102, King Henry I of England granted the fee of the ancient wapentake of Blackburnshire and further holdings in Hornby, and the vills of Chipping, Aighton and Dutton in Amounderness to de Lacy while confirming his possession of the Lordship of Bowland. These lands formed the basis of what became known as the Honour of Clitheroe.

John de Lacy (d.1240), a descendant via a female line whose father, Roger Fitz John, Constable of Chester, adopted the surname "de Lacy", gained more titles, including that of the Earldom of Lincoln in 1221.

=== Notable family members ===
Arms of John de Lacy, 2nd Earl of Lincoln

Hugh de Lacy, Lord of Lassy (Normandy) (c. 1020 – 27 March 1085, Hereford)

- Ilbert de Lacy (1045, Lassy – 1093, Pontefract), 1st Baron of Pontefract, son of Hugh de Lacy, who received a large fief in Yorkshire, Lincolnshire and Nottinghamshire and built Pontefract Castle.
  - Robert de Lacy (probably died before 1130), 2nd Baron of Pontefract, 2nd Lord of Bowland, the son of Ilbert. He founded Pontefract Priory about 1090 and built Clitheroe Castle.
    - Ilbert de Lacy (died c.1141), 3rd Baron of Pontefract, 3rd Lord of Bowland, the eldest son of Robert de Lacy. He was captured with King Stephen during the Battle of Lincoln (1141), possibly dying in captivity.
    - Henry de Lacy (died 1177), 4th Baron of Pontefract, 4th Lord of Bowland, the second son of Robert de Lacy. He built Kirkstall Abbey.
      - Robert de Lacy (died 1193), 5th Baron of Pontefract, 5th Lord of Bowland, son of Henry. Although he married he had no children. Buried at Kirkstall.
    - Albreda de Lacy, daughter of Robert de Lacy the 2nd Baron, who married Robert de Lissours.
      - Albreda de Lissours, the daughter of Albreda de Lacy, married Richard fitz Eustace (d. c. 1163), of Halton Castle, Constable of Chester and feudal baron of Halton.
        - John FitzRichard (died 1190), 6th Baron of Halton, the son of Richard fitz Eustace. He served with King Richard I of England in the Third Crusade and died at the siege of Tyre. He founded Stanlow Abbey on the banks of the River Mersey in 1178.
          - Roger de Lacy (1170–1211), 6th Baron of Pontefract, 7th Baron of Halton, 7th Lord of Bowland, was the son of John FitzRichard and the grandson of Albreda de Lissours. He adopted surname de Lacy. In addition to inheriting his grandmother's vast holdings, Robert also inherited his father's hereditary title of Constable of Chester and the Barony of Halton with Halton Castle and the lordship of Donington in Leicestershire. In 1205 he purchased the barony of Penwortham It seems that one of his daughters married Alan, Lord of Galloway (died 1234), who later married Rose, the daughter of Hugh de Lacy, 1st Earl of Ulster.
            - John de Lacy, 2nd Earl of Lincoln (c. 1192 – 22 July 1240), 2nd Earl of Lincoln (jure uxoris, from 1232), 7th Baron of Pontefract, 8th Baron of Halton, 8th Lord of Bowland, son of Roger. He and his cousin Robert de Vere, Earl of Oxford, chosen surety to enforce the king's adherence to Magna Carta. John de Lacy was buried in Stanlow Abbey.
              - Maud de Lacy (1222–1262), eldest child of the 2nd earl. Married Richard de Clare in 1238, becoming the Countess of Hertford and of Gloucester.
              - Edmund de Lacy (c. 1230–1258), 8th Baron of Pontefract, 9th Lord of Bowland, son of John. He inherited his father's titles but as he predeceased his mother (Margaret de Quincy) he never became the Earl of Lincoln.
                - Henry de Lacy (c. 1251–1311) 3rd Earl of Lincoln, 9th Baron of Pontefract, 10th Lord of Bowland, son of Edmund and grandson of the 2nd Earl. In 1282 he was granted the Lordship of Denbigh and built Denbigh Castle. He oversaw the transfer of the monastery from Stanlow to Whalley near Clitheroe in 1296.
                  - Alice de Lacy, 4th Countess of Lincoln, 5th Countess of Salisbury (daughter of the 3rd Earl). Also inherited the Earldom of Salisbury through her mother Margaret Longespée. In 1294 Alice was married to Thomas of Lancaster, the nephew of King Edward I of England. After her husband's arrest for treason in 1322 most of Alice's estates were seized by the then-king, Edward II.

== Lords of Weobley and Ludlow ==
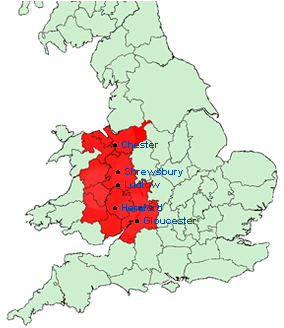
The counties considered to be the Welsh Marches (in red)

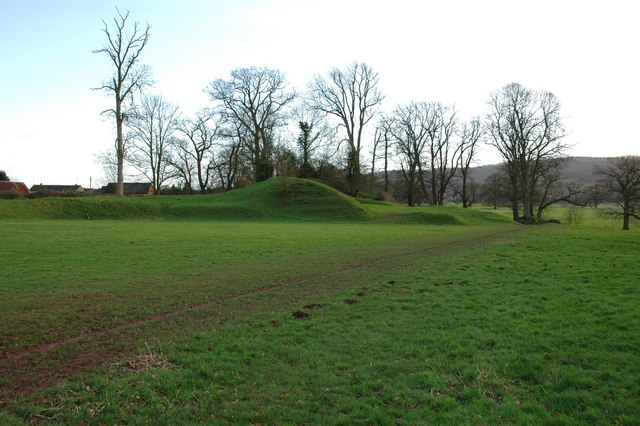
Site of Weobley Castle

Walter de Lacy, the son of Hugh de Lacy, Lord of Lassy, was granted the lordship of Weobley in Herefordshire after the Conquest. He is already attested in the Welsh Marches by 1069. By the time of Walter's death, he held blocks of land in Herefordshire (including Holme Lacy) along the border with Wales with another group of lands centered on Ludlow in Shropshire. These groupings allowed Walter to help defend the England–Wales border against Welsh raids. He also had smaller holdings in Berkshire, Gloucestershire, Worcestershire and Oxfordshire. Walter was second in the region only to William FitzOsbern, 1st Earl of Hereford and his son, Roger de Breteuil although he was not subordinate to them. After the latter's rebellion against the king in 1075 (which Walter de Lacy helped to ensure failed) Walter became the leading baron in the region.

=== Notable family members ===
- Walter de Lacy (died 1085), son of Hugh de Lacy, who received lands in Herefordshire and Shropshire
  - Roger de Lacy (died after 1106), eldest son of Walter, who built Ludlow Castle. Following his banishment from England, his English estates were confiscated.
    - Gilbert de Lacy (died after 1163), son of Roger, who inherited his father's estates in Normandy only. He succeeded in recovering his father's lands about Longtown, Weobley and Ludlow. He became a Templar in the 1150s and granted the Templars Guiting in Gloucestershire.
      - Robert de Lacy, eldest son of Gilbert, who predeceased his father
      - Hugh de Lacy, younger son of Gilbert, who inherited his father's estates. He was later awarded the Lordship of Meath in Ireland.
  - Hugh de Lacy (died before 1115), younger son of Walter, who received the English lands upon his brother's banishment. The de Lacy lands then passed to Pain fitzJohn (a relation by marriage) and others.
  - Walter de Lacy, Abbot of Gloucester Abbey, son of Walter

== Lordship of Meath ==
Arms of Hugh de Lacy, Lord of Meath

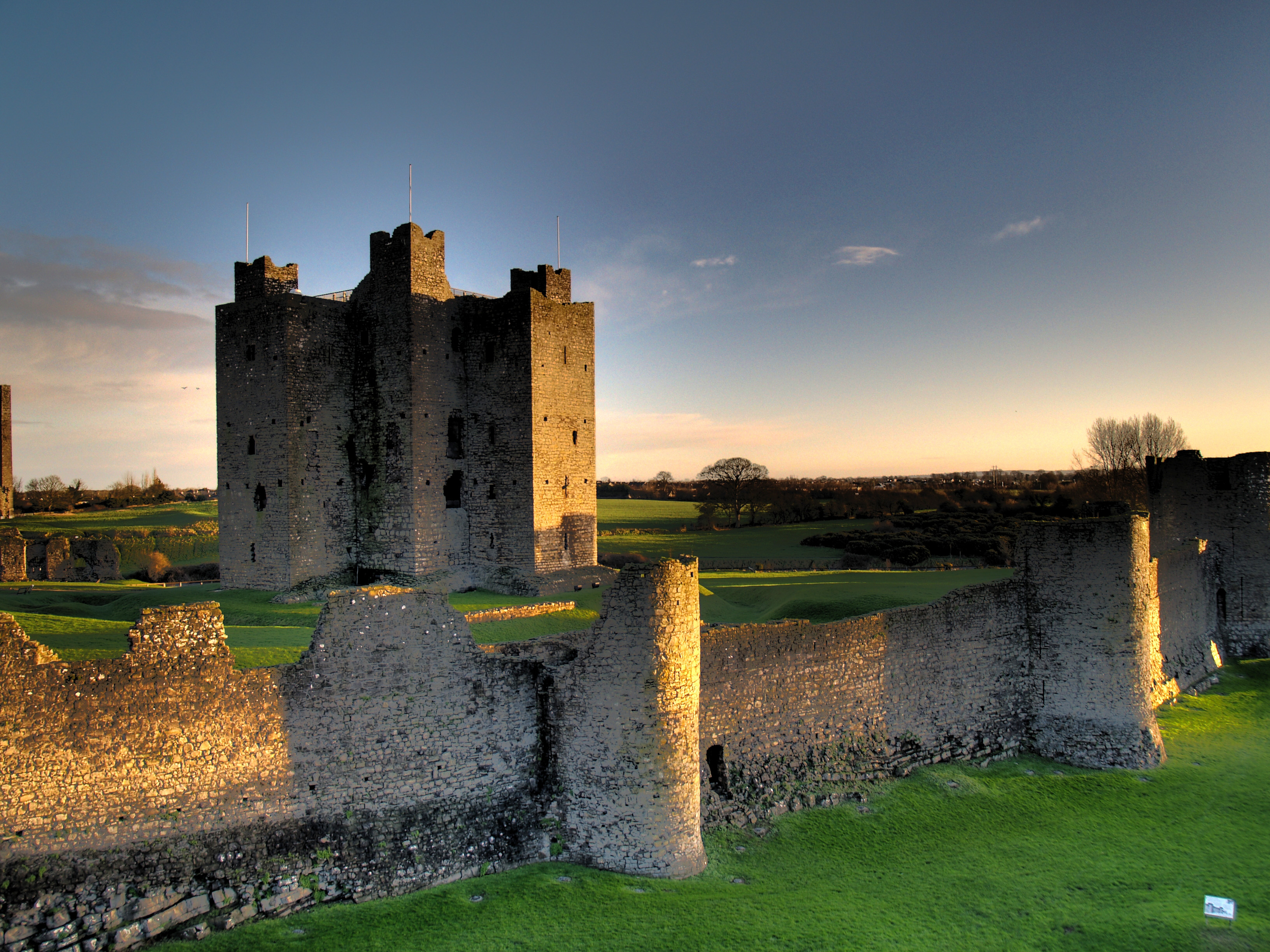
Trim Castle, County Meath, Ireland

In addition to his substantial land holdings in Herefordshire and Shropshire, England as 4th Baron de Lacy, Hugh de Lacy was also a substantial land holder in Ireland. Following his participation in the Norman invasion of Ireland, he was granted the lands of a Gaelic medieval kingdom by the Anglo-Norman King Henry II of England in 1172 by the service of fifty knights. The Lordship of Meath was an extensive seigniorial liberty in medieval Ireland with almost royal authority. The Lordship was roughly co-extensive with the Kingdom of Meath. At its greatest extent, it included all of the modern counties of Fingal, Meath (which takes its name from the kingdom), Westmeath as well as parts of counties Cavan, Kildare, Longford, Louth and Offaly. The Lordship's caput was Trim Castle. With an area of 30,000 m^{2}, it is the largest castle in Ireland. The design of the central three-storey keep (also known as a donjon or great tower) is unique for a Norman keep being of cruciform shape, with twenty corners.

These lords were reliant on their own aggression for laying claim to their lands and for securing them. Castles, by virtue of their defensive and offensive capabilities as well as their symbolic status, were indispensable for dominating the area of the lordship. Known as a great builder of castles, by c. 1200, de Lacy had settlements all over the lordship, either in his own hands or the hands of his barons. With his son Walter (1180–1240) he built Trim Castle and Kilkea Castle. Some time after 1196, Walter granted "the whole land of Rathtowth" to his younger brother, Hugh. This sub-division, named the Barony of Ratoath, was perhaps the first instance of the use of the term barony in Ireland for a division of a county. By letters patent from John, King of England, the prescriptive barony was granted to Walter de Lacy and his heirs in perpetuity in 1208.

=== Notable family members ===
Hugh de Lacy, Lord of Meath (before 1135 – 25 July 1186) was the great-grandson of Walter de Lacy of the Norman Conquest.

- Walter (before 1170 to 24 February 1240/41), 2nd Lord of Meath, 5th Baron de Lacy of Longtown, Weobley and Ludlow, eldest son of Hugh, married Margaret de Braose.
  - Egidia de Lacy, Lady of Connacht, daughter of 2nd Lord, married Richard Mór de Burgh, 1st Baron of Connaught and Strathearn. Her descendants include the Earls of Ulster (of the second creation) and Lady Elizabeth de Burgh, the wife of Robert the Bruce.
  - Gilbert de Lacy, son of Walter, married Isabel Bigod, daughter of Sir Hugh Bigod, 3rd Earl of Norfolk. He predeceased his father before 25 December 1230.
    - Walter de Lacy son of Gilbert, married Rohese le Botiller but had no issue.
    - Margery (Margaret) de Lacy, daughter of Gilbert, married Sir John de Verdun, the son of Theobald le Botiller, 2nd Chief Butler of Ireland and Rohese de Verdun. As co-heir with her sister to her grandfather's estates, she received Westmeath as her inheritance.
    - Maud de Lacy, daughter of Gilbert, married Lord Geoffrey de Geneville, Justiciar of Ireland, the son of Simon de Joinville, Seneschal of Champagne, and Beatrix of Burgundy. As co-heir with her sister to her grandfather's estates, she received the eastern part of the lordship as her inheritance.
      - Geoffrey de Geneville (died 1283), son of Maud.
      - Joan de Geneville, daughter of Maud, who married Gerald FitzMaurice FitzGerald (died 1287).
      - Sir Piers de Geneville (1256 – shortly before June 1292), son of Maud, married in 1283 Jeanne of Lusignan.
        - Joan de Geneville, 2nd Baroness Geneville, daughter of Sir Piers de Geneville, who married Roger Mortimer, 1st Earl of March. Mortimer, by his vigorous action in Ireland, succeeded in re-uniting the two halves of the Lordship of Meath.
- Hugh de Lacy, 1st Earl of Ulster (before 1179 – after 26 December 1242), younger son of Hugh de Lacy, was created Earl of Ulster in 1205.
  - Rose de Lacy (died after 1237), married Alan, Lord of Galloway (died 1234).

== Other possible notable members of the family ==
Several later families claim descent from the Hiberno-Norman Lacys.

The Lacy baronets of Ampton Hall, granted their title in the 20th century, derive from a Wexford Lacy family that claim descent from the Anglo-Norman de Lacy family.

It is claimed that a Limerick Lacy family that gave rise to several continental generals were descendants of Hugh de Lacy, Lord of Meath, but this claim has been challenged by Synnott, who suggested that the Limerick families may have originated as Lees, a name of frequent occurrence in Limerick records from the 12th to the 15th centuries. Members of this family include:

- Count Peter Lacy (Peter Graf von Lacy, Pierce Edmond de Lacy, 1678–1751)
- Franz Moritz von Lacy (1725–1801), son of Peter
- Luis de Lacy (1775–1817)

== Other people with the surname ==
- Charles de Lacy (1856–1929), British marine painter
- Evelyn de Lacy (1917–2004), Australian freestyle swimmer
- Hector de Lacy (1900–1956), Australian rules football writer
- Hugh De Lacy (politician) (1910–1986), American politician and socialist
- Keith De Lacy (1940–2021), Australian politician and businessman
- Patrick DeLacy (1835–1915), American Civil War soldier awarded the Medal of Honor
- Philippe De Lacy (1917–1995), French-born American child actor, later a film producer, director, and cinematographer
- Robert De Lacey (1892–1976), American film director
- Thomas de Lacy (1773–1844), Irish Anglican priest and Archdeacon of Meath

== See also ==
- Hugh De Lacy (disambiguation)
- Lacy knot
