= Pontefract (disambiguation) =

Pontefract is a historic market town in West Yorkshire, England.

Pontefract may also refer to:

== People ==
- Ella Pontefract (1896–1945), English writer
- Richard de Pontefract (fl. 1320), English Dominican friar
- Pontefract de Lacys' family tree
- Dan Pontefract, Canadian businessperson and writer

== Other ==
- Honour of Pontefract, a medieval English feudal barony which has existed since 1068 in present-day West Yorkshire
- Pontefract cake, a type of small, roughly circular black sweet
- Pontefract Castle, a castle ruin in Pontefract, England
- Mansfield-et-Pontefract, a municipality in Quebec
- Pontefract (UK Parliament constituency)
