= Richard fitz Eustace =

Constable of Chester (died c. 1163)

Richard fitz Eustace (died circa 1163) was Constable of Chester and Baron of Halton within the County Palatine of Chester ruled by the Earl of Chester.

He was a son of Eustace fitz John (died 1157), hereditary Constable of Chester, by his second wife Agnes, daughter and eventual heiress of William fitz Nigel (died 1134), of Halton Castle, hereditary Constable of Chester and feudal Baron of Halton. Richard fitz Eustace in turn inherited the barony and constableship. During the reign of King Henry II, Richard held one knight's fee in Smathe, Yorkshire.

== Family ==
He married Aubrey (or Albreda) de Lissours, daughter of Robert de Lissours by his wife Aubrey (or Albreda) de Lacy, daughter and eventual heiress of Robert de Lacy, baron of Pontefract in Yorkshire. The de Lacy family took its name from the manor of Lassy in Calvados, Normandy. Albreda de Lissours survived Richard and married William FitzWilliam, by whom she had further children. With Richard, she had the following children:

- John fitz Richard, died 1190, eldest son and heir, Constable of Chester and feudal baron of Halton. He married Alice of Essex, a daughter of Robert of Essex by his wife, Alice, by whom he had several children. Some of his descendants took the de Lacy surname.
- Roger fitz Richard (potentially) ('Roger of Warkworth'), died 1177, who was granted Warkworth Castle in Northumberland by King Henry II. He married Adelisa de Vere and had children.
- Robert fitz Richard ('Robert the Hospitaller') died circa 1197, Prior of the Knights Hospitaller in England.
- Mary fitz Richard, died c. 1185, married Robert de Aldford.
- Aubrey fitz Richard, died c. 1199, married Henry Bisset.
