= Constable of Chester =

Mediaeval hereditary office

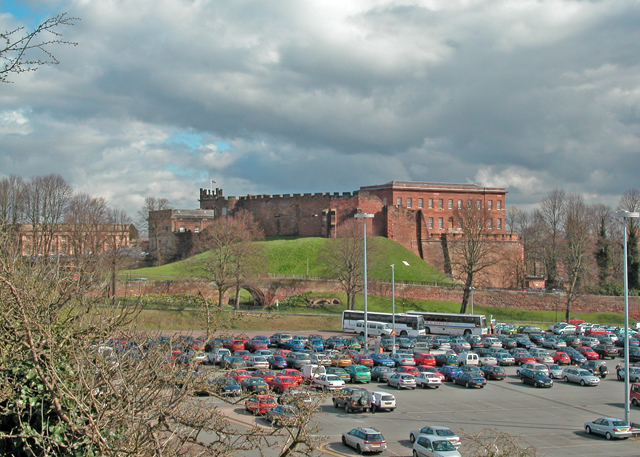
Chester Castle today, within the City of Chester, in Cheshire. Much of the structure is modern rebuilding, but the mediaeval castle mound survives

The Constable of Chester was a mediaeval hereditary office held by the Barons of Halton. The functions of the Constable are unclear, possibly they related to the custody of Chester Castle (built in 1070 by Hugh d'Avranches, 1st Earl of Chester), as was the main function of most mediaeval constables, but Sanders (1960) says the office-holder was constable for the entire County Palatine.

== Creation of office ==
In 1071, Hugh d'Avranches, Earl of Chester (c. 1047–1101), (also known as "Hugh Lupus"), received from his maternal half-uncle King William the Conqueror the whole of the County Palatine of Chester (excluding episcopal lands) "to hold as freely by the sword as he (the king) himself held the Kingdom of England by the crown" and was appointed Earl of Chester and Count Palatine. Hugh is believed to have appointed eight hereditary barons to serve under him, one of whom was William fitz Nigel, Baron of Halton, Hereditary Constable and Marshal. Many sources place Nigel of Cotentin (fl.c. 1071–1080), the father of William fitz Nigel, as the first Hereditary Constable of Chester. Before the end of the 14th century the office changed to Governor of Chester, a military officer responsible for the garrison at Chester Castle, later assisted by a Lieutenant-Governor.

== List of Constables ==
The list of Hereditary Constables of Chester is as follows:

=== Nigel of Cotentin (fl.c. 1071–1080) ===
Nigel of Cotentin (fl.c. 1071/80), from the Cotentin Peninsula in Normandy, of Halton Castle in Cheshire (situated on the River Mersey, 13 miles (21 km) north-east of Chester Castle), is believed to have been the first Constable of Chester and was the 1st Baron of Halton, one of the feudal baronies of the County Palatine of Chester established by Hugh d'Avranches, 1st Earl of Chester. In 1077 Nigel fought against the Welsh at the Battle of Rhuddlan, as part of the Earl's campaign to conquer North Wales, the mountainous terrain to the west of Chester. It was almost certainly he who built the motte-and-bailey castle on Halton Hill.

=== William fitz Nigel (d. 1134) ===
William fitz Nigel (d. 1133/4), son and heir, of Halton Castle, 2nd Baron of Halton, 2nd Constable of Chester. From his wife, believed to have been the eldest daughter and heiress of Yorfid, baron of Widnes he inherited the Lancashire manors of Widnes, Appleton, Cronton and Rainhill. In 1115 he founded Runcorn Priory of the Augustinian Order of Canons Regular, 1.5 miles west of Halton (which his son later moved to Norton), which the foundation charter states to have been done at the suggestion of Robert de Limesey, Bishop of Chester, and with the consent of Richard d'Avranches, 2nd Earl of Chester (1094–1120). He was buried at Chester.

=== William fitz William (d. 1149/50) ===
William fitz William (d. 1149/50), son, of Halton Castle, 3rd Baron of Halton, 3rd Constable of Chester. In 1134 he moved Runcorn Priory 2.2 miles (3.5 km) to the east at Norton, when it became Norton Priory, making it 0.9 miles north-east of Halton Castle. The move was done "at the request and on the advice of" Roger de Clinton, Bishop of Lichfield and Coventry (whose diocese then covered Chester), probably to provide the canons with a larger and healthier site. He died in Normandy, without issue, when his titles and offices passed to his brother-in-law Eustace fitz John, husband of his sister Agnes.

=== Eustace fitz John (died 1157) ===
Eustace fitz John (died 1157), jure uxoris 4th Baron of Halton, 4th Constable of Chester, was a powerful magnate in northern England during the reigns of Henry I, Stephen and Henry II. He was a son of Domesday Book landholder John fitzRichard. King William II (1087–1100) granted Eustace custody of Bamburgh Castle in Northumberland, which he rebuilt in stone and in 1130 Eustace acquired the fee farm of the feudal barony of Knaresborough in Yorkshire. By his first marriage to the heiress Beatrice de Vesci he acquired Malton Castle in Yorkshire and Alnwick Castle in Northumberland, and became jure uxoris feudal baron of Alnwick. He founded Malton Priory and Watton Priory. He had a son by Beatrice de Vesci, namely William de Vesci I (d.1183), who took his mother's surname and succeeded her as feudal baron of Alnwick in Northumberland. He served jointly with Walter Espec as justiciar of the North. From about 1144 he became one of the main followers of Ranulf de Gernon, 4th Earl of Chester (1099–1153), from whom he gained much land. He married as his second wife Agnes, the elder of two daughters of William fitz Nigel of Halton, and on the childless death of her brother William fitz William, Eustace received much of the inheritance, including the barony of Halton and Chester constableship, as well as the manor of Donington in Leicestershire, where he built Donington Castle.

=== Richard fitz Eustace (d. circa 1163) ===
Richard fitz Eustace (d. circa 1163), of Halton Castle, 5th Baron of Halton, 5th Constable of Chester, son of Eustace fitz John by his second wife Agnes de Halton, heiress of Halton. He married as his second wife Aubrey/Albreda de Lissours, daughter of Robert de Lissours by his wife Aubrey/Albreda de Lacy, daughter and eventual sole heiress of Robert de Lacy I (d.pre-1130), feudal baron of Pontefract in Yorkshire and lord of Bowland ("lord of the Fells"), who founded Pontefract Priory and built Clitheroe Castle. Aubrey/Albreda de Lacy was the heiress of her childless first cousin Robert de Lacy II (d.1193), baron of Pontefract and lord of Bowland, buried in Kirkstall Abbey, Yorkshire, built by his father (and Aubrey's youngest brother) Henry de Lacy (d.1177).

Arms of John fitz Richard (died 1190)

=== John fitz Richard (died 1190) ===
John fitz Richard (died 1190), 6th Baron of Halton, 6th Constable of Chester, son of Richard fitz Eustace by Albreda de Lissours. He was the chief official of Hugh de Kevelioc, 5th Earl of Chester (1147–1181) and of his son and heir Ranulf de Blondeville, 6th Earl of Chester (1170–1232). Historical records refer to him as 'John, Constable of Chester'; He founded Stanlow Abbey, a Cistercian abbey situated on Stanlow Point, on the banks of the River Mersey in Cheshire, near today's Ellesmere Port, 11 km north of Chester Castle and 12 km south-west of Halton. He married Alice of Essex, a daughter of Robert of Essex by his wife Alice and died in 1190 at the Siege of Acre whilst on Crusade in the Holy Land.

=== Roger de Lacy (1170–1211) ===
Roger de Lacy (1170–1211), 7th Baron of Halton, 7th Constable of Chester, feudal baron of Pontefract, eldest son and heir of John fitz Richard. Also known as Roger le Constable. He also served as Sheriff of Yorkshire and Sheriff of Cumberland. He married Maud de Clere and was buried at Stanlow Abbey.

Arms of the de Lacy Earls of Lincoln

=== John de Lacy, 2nd Earl of Lincoln (c. 1192–1240) ===
Roger de Lacy's son and heir was John de Lacy, 2nd Earl of Lincoln (c. 1192–1240) 8th Baron of Halton, 8th Constable of Chester, feudal baron of Pontefract. He was one of the 25 barons who forced King John to sign Magna Carta in 1215. He married (as his second wife) Margaret de Quincy, only daughter and heiress of Robert de Quincy (d.1217) (son and heir apparent of Saer de Quincy, 1st Earl of Winchester who had been one of the leaders of the baronial rebellion against King John).

=== Edmund de Lacy (c.1230–1258) ===
Edmund de Lacy, Baron of Pontefract (c.1230–1258), 9th Baron of Halton, 9th Constable of Chester, feudal baron of Pontefract, son and heir. A minor at the death of his father he entered wardship, which was purchased by his mother. He married Alésia of Saluzzo, a Savoyard he met at the royal court of King Henry III, a daughter of Manfred III of Saluzzo.

=== Henry de Lacy, 3rd Earl of Lincoln (c. 1251–1311) ===
Henry de Lacy, 3rd Earl of Lincoln (c. 1251–1311), 10th Baron of Halton, 10th Constable of Chester, feudal baron of Pontefract, son and heir. He was a confidant of King Edward I. By his first wife Margaret Longespée he had an only daughter and heiress Alice de Lacy, 4th Countess of Lincoln.

=== Alice de Lacy, 4th Countess of Lincoln (1270–1348) ===
Alice de Lacy, 4th Countess of Lincoln (1270–1348) was the daughter and sole heiress of the 4th Earl, her two brothers having died in childhood. She married Thomas, 2nd Earl of Lancaster, but they had no children. Thomas became one of the leaders of the baronial opposition to his first cousin, King Edward II and his estates were forfeited to the crown, but that could not legally include his wife's estates. On her death without children her titles became extinct and many of her estates passed to Thomas's heirs the Earls and Dukes of Lancaster.

== See also ==
- Barony of Halton
- History of Cheshire
- High Sheriff of Cheshire
