= Robert fitz Richard (Grand Prior) =

Robert fitz Richard (died c. 1197), also known as Roberto di Riccardi and Robert the Hospitaller, was a 12th–century Grand Prior of the Knights Hospitaller in England. He was the son of Richard fitz Eustace and Albreda de Lacy.

== Life ==
Robert was a son of Richard fitz Eustace, Baron of Halton and Constable of Chester and Albreda de Lacy. He was the Grand Prior of the Knights Hospitaller in England in 1197.
