= Pontefract Museum =

Museum in Pontefract, West Yorkshire, England

Coordinates: 53.6920°N 1.3120°W

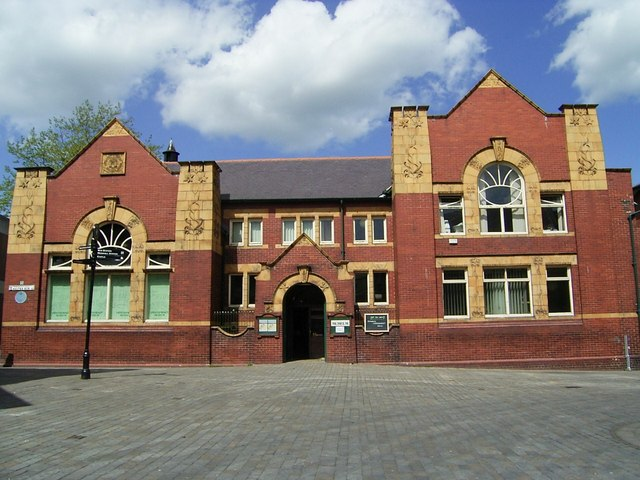
Pontefract Museum

Pontefract Museum is a local museum in Pontefract, West Yorkshire, England. The collections cover archaeology, archives, decorative and applied art, fine art, photographs and social history. The museum opened in 1975.

== History ==
The museum is located in an Art Nouveau building in the middle of the town which was originally a Carnegie library. The library was opened in 1904 and designed by George Pennington. In 1975, a new library was built and the Carnegie building was converted into a museum. It retains a tiled entrance hall and original 1904 furnishings. The building was registered as Grade II Listed when it was opened as a museum in March 1975.

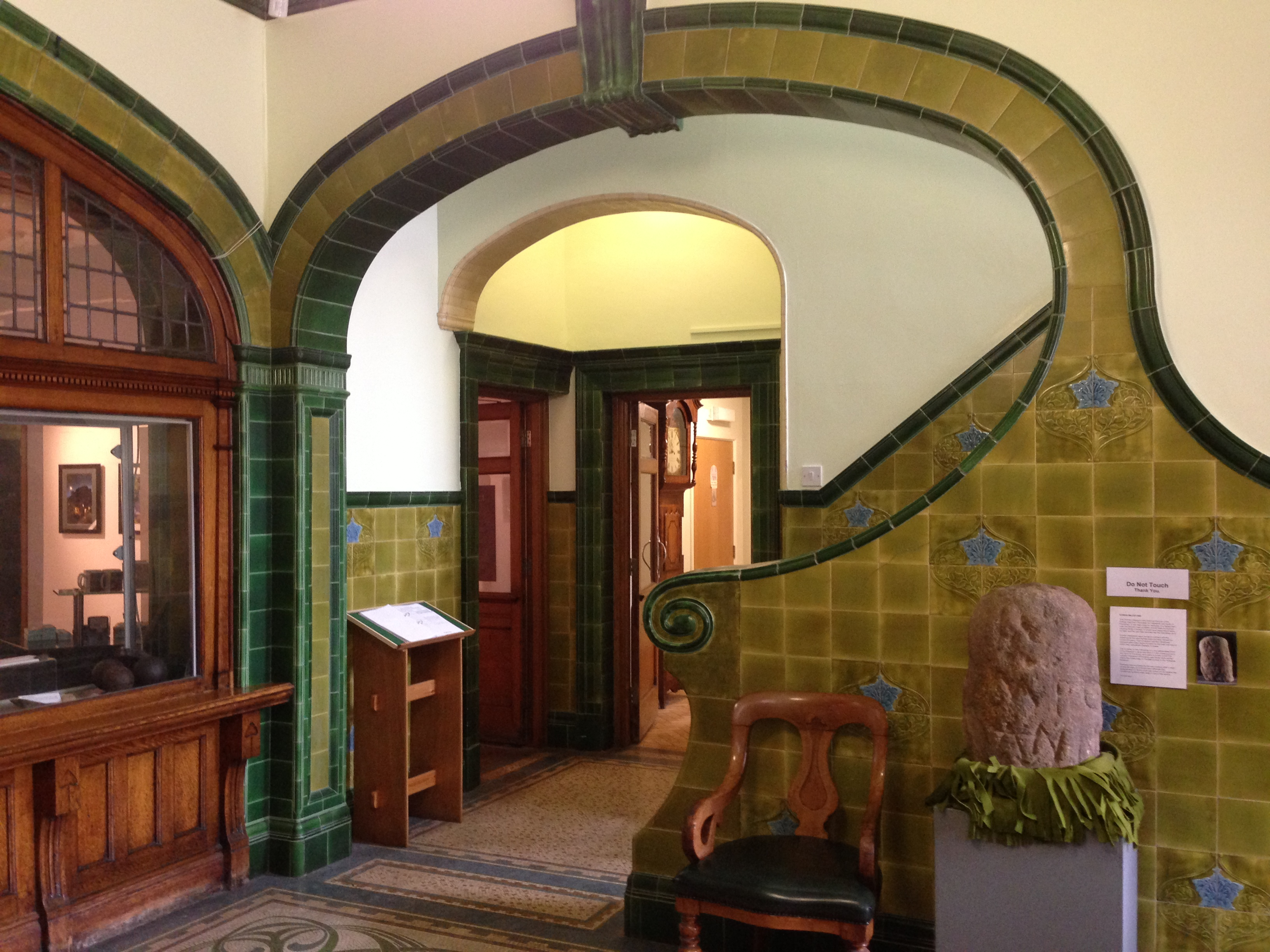
Art Nouveau tiling in the entrance hall

== Collections ==
Exhibits include information on Pontefract Castle and the liquorice industry (Pontefract Cakes) on the town. There are archaeological finds from Pontefract Castle and St. John's Priory, Pontefract, including the Ackworth Hoard, made up of almost 600 coins dating from the English Civil War. In addition, there are displays of packaging from the Pontefract liquorice factories, coloured glass and locally printed materials. Pontefract was also the location of the country's first secret ballot, which took place in 1872, and the ballot box (which was sealed with Pontefract liquorice) is held in the museum. Most of the collection has Pontefract connections, including the mining history of the town. The museum has three exhibition spaces and, as well as the permanent collections, the museum has a space for temporary exhibitions, and a reference room holding archives relating to the town's history.

== See also ==
- Listed buildings in Pontefract
