= Ackworth Hoard =

Civil War hoard from West Yorkshire, England

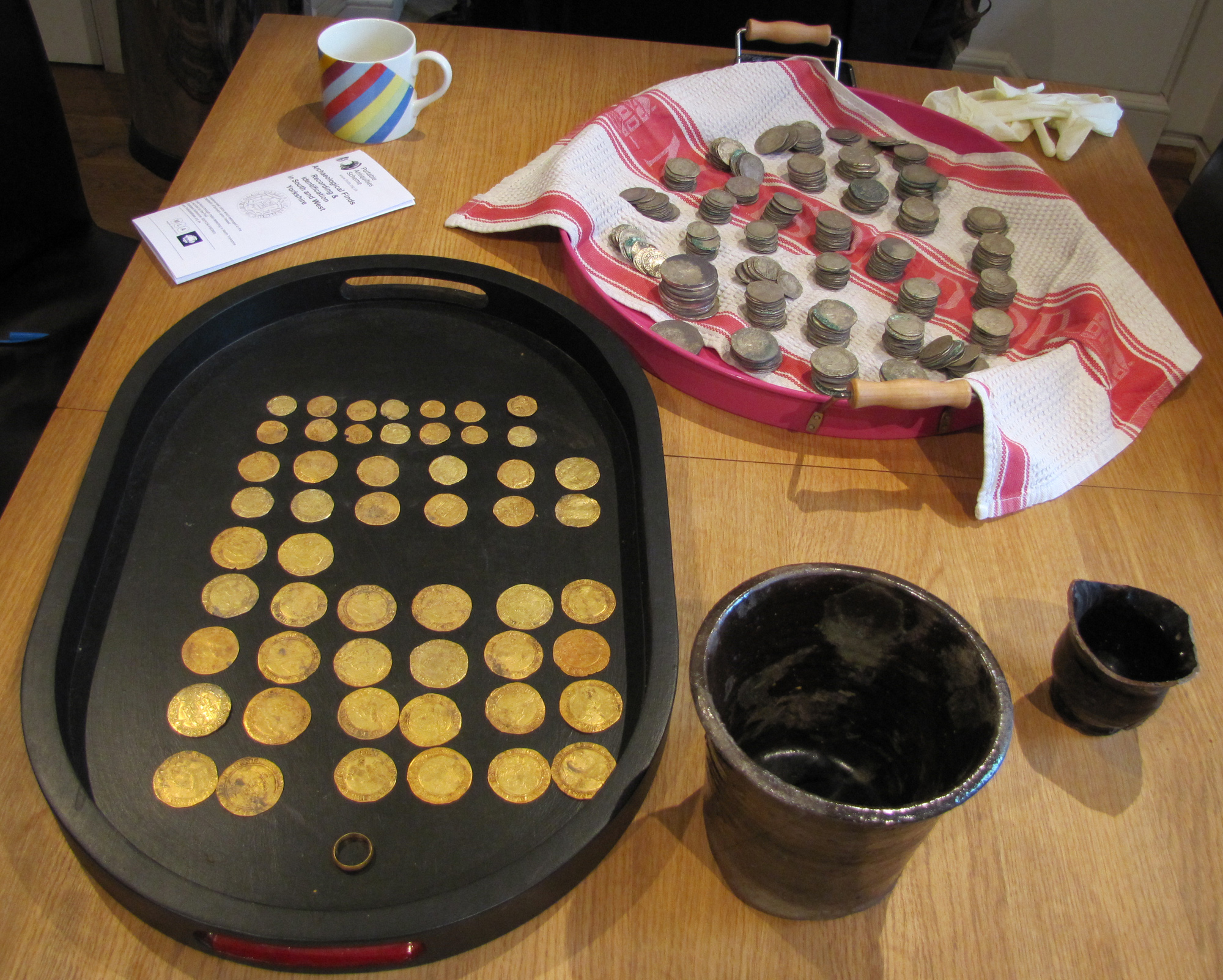
- The hoard shortly after discovery
- Created: c. 1645–1646
- Period/culture: English Civil War
- Discovered: 2011; Ackworth, West Yorkshire
- Present location: Pontefract Museum

The Ackworth Hoard is a Post-Medieval hoard dating from the English Civil War from Ackworth, West Yorkshire.

== Discovery ==
The hoard was found by Dr Owen Johnson in his garden in Ackworth in 2011. In his own words he pulled at the ceramic vessel and the coins spilled out "like coins from a slot machine." The coins were reported to the Portable Antiquities Scheme and subsequently declared as treasure. It is the only known Civil War hoard from Wakefield District.

== Contents and interpretation ==
The hoard comprises a ceramic vessel containing a hoard of 591 coins, a gold finger ring, and a piece of leather. A smaller ceramic vessel was found nearby and might have been associated. Of the 591 coins, 52 are gold and the earliest coin was minted in 1547–1549. 523 are silver issues of English and Scottish monarchs, 4 are Irish, and 12 are from the Netherlands. The group of coins has been interpreted as a single deposition made in the 17th century rather than something added to over time. The assemblage is consistent as a group of coins and other objects deposited in the mid-1640s during the English Civil War. When it was deposited, the total value of the coinage was £85 and 12 shillings. The modern value of the coins is around £9,000. The latest dateable coin in the hoard is from 1645 to 1646. The hoard had 12 ducatons from the Spanish Netherlands: one issued jointly by Albert VII and Isabella, and 11 by Philip IV.

The siege of Pontefract Castle occurred in 1645 and its occupants were stranded in Ackworth; the hoard was therefore probably deposited during this time. At a time when an infantryman had a daily salary of 8 to 10 pence, the hoard represented at least five years of wages. The hoard was most likely buried by a Royalist when Parliamentarian forces arrived in the town, indicated by the heavy concentration of Royalist coins minted at York and Oxford, and the presence of foreign coins used by Royalists. The owner of the hoard might have died or moved away during the siege or the concurrent plague.

Other than coins the hoard includes a gold finger ring and two ceramic vessels. The ring is a posy ring dated to the late 16th-early 17th century, and bears an inscription on the interior of the band which reads: "When this you see remember me". This inscription was in use for posy rings from 1596 up till 1735 at least. The pots are both made from a dark earthenware with a dark brown glaze, probably Black Ware or Cistercian Ware, and the coins were all found in the larger of the two. Both of these types are known to have been made at Wrenthorpe during this period, located around 10 miles (16 km) from Ackworth.

English Coins in the Hoard
Emperor/Issuer	Gold coins	Silver coins
Edward VI	1 (Note: An half sovereign)	4 (Note: Two shillings and two sixpences)
Elizabeth I	—	151 (Note: 30 shillings and 121 sixpences)
James I	27 (Note: Five unites, three double crowns, four Britain crowns, three half crowns, eight laurels, two half laurels and two quarter lawrels)	46 (Note: One half crown, 25 shillings and 20 sixpences)
Charles I	23 (Note: 13 unites, six double crowns and four crowns)	310 (Note: 90 half crowns, 189 shillings and 31 sixpences)

== Gallery ==
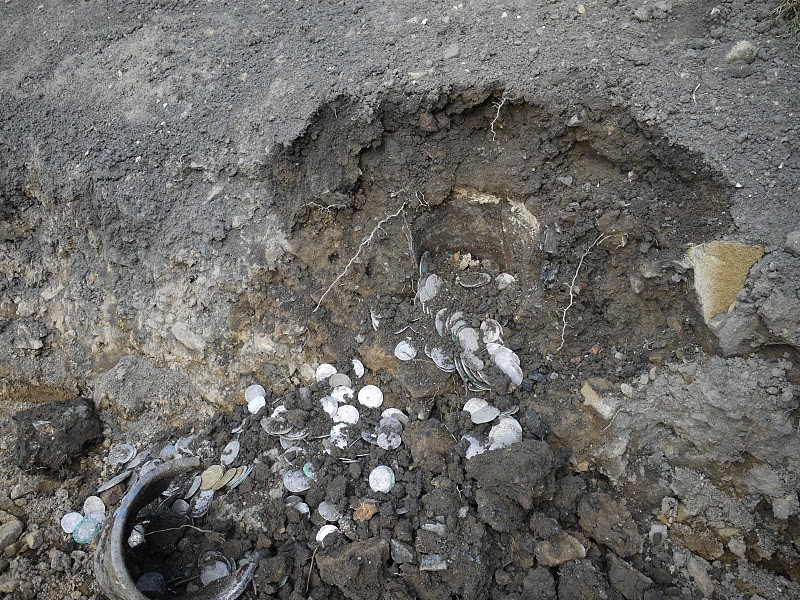
The hoard in situ in the finder's garden

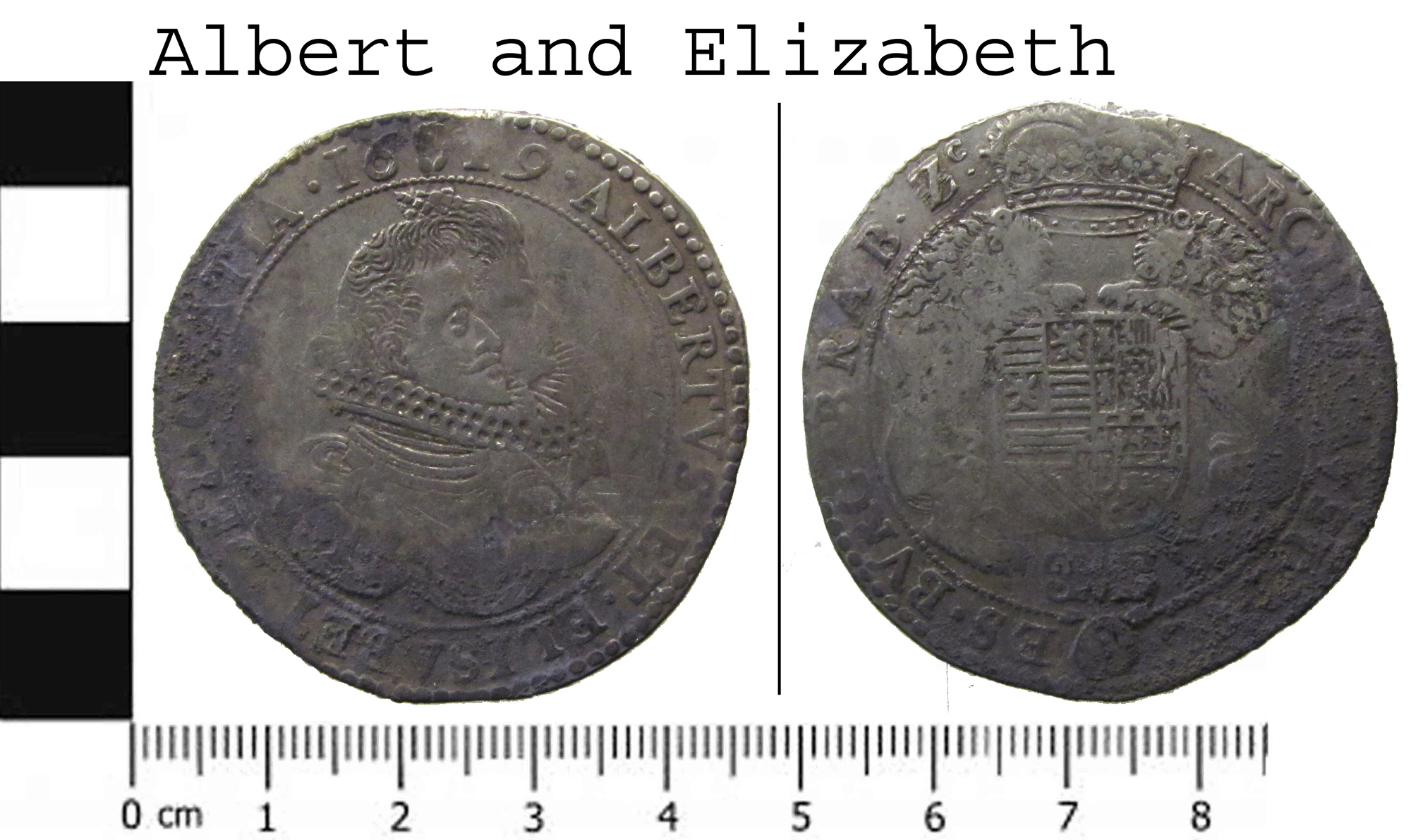
Ducaton of Albert and Elizabeth

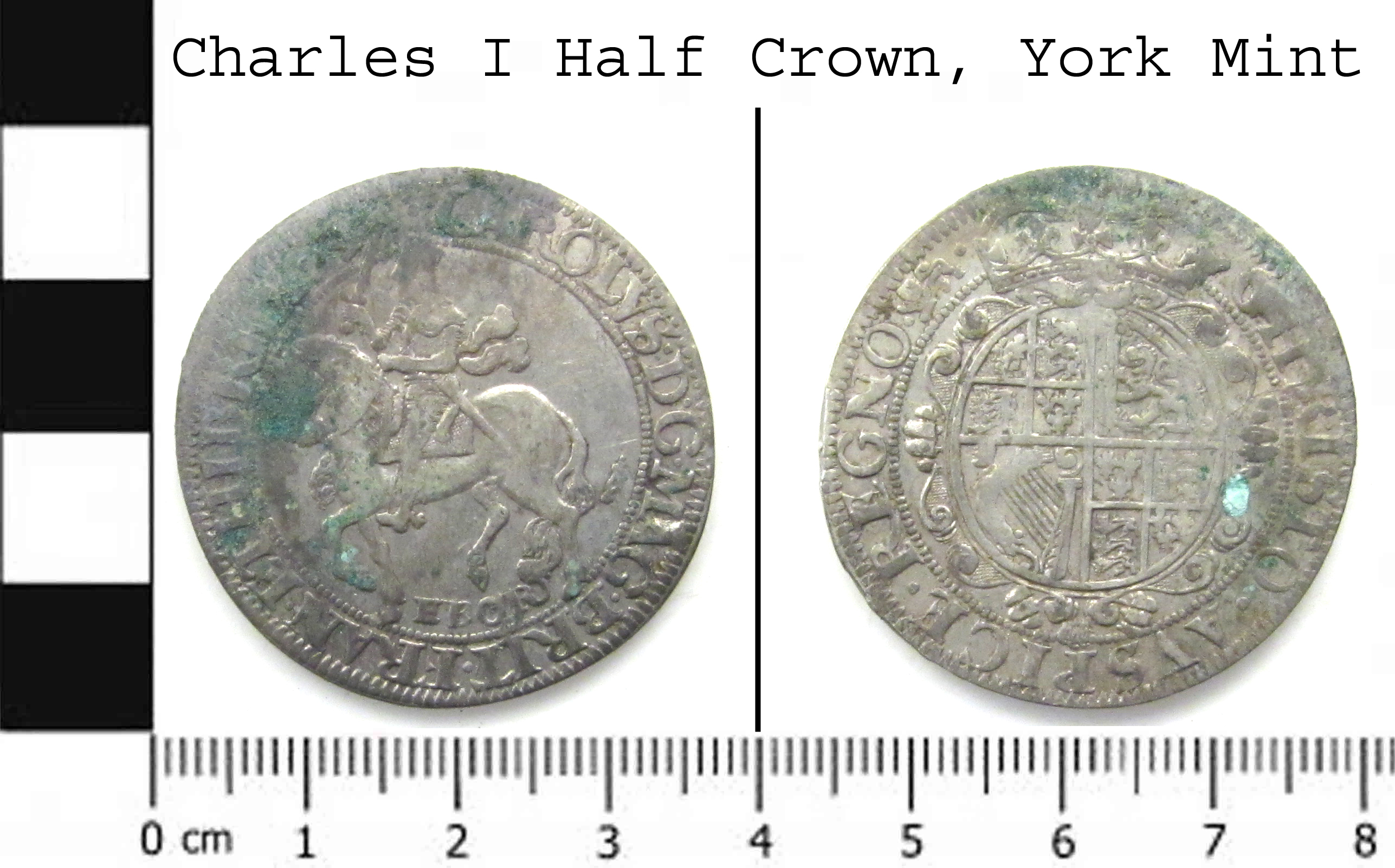
Charles I half crown

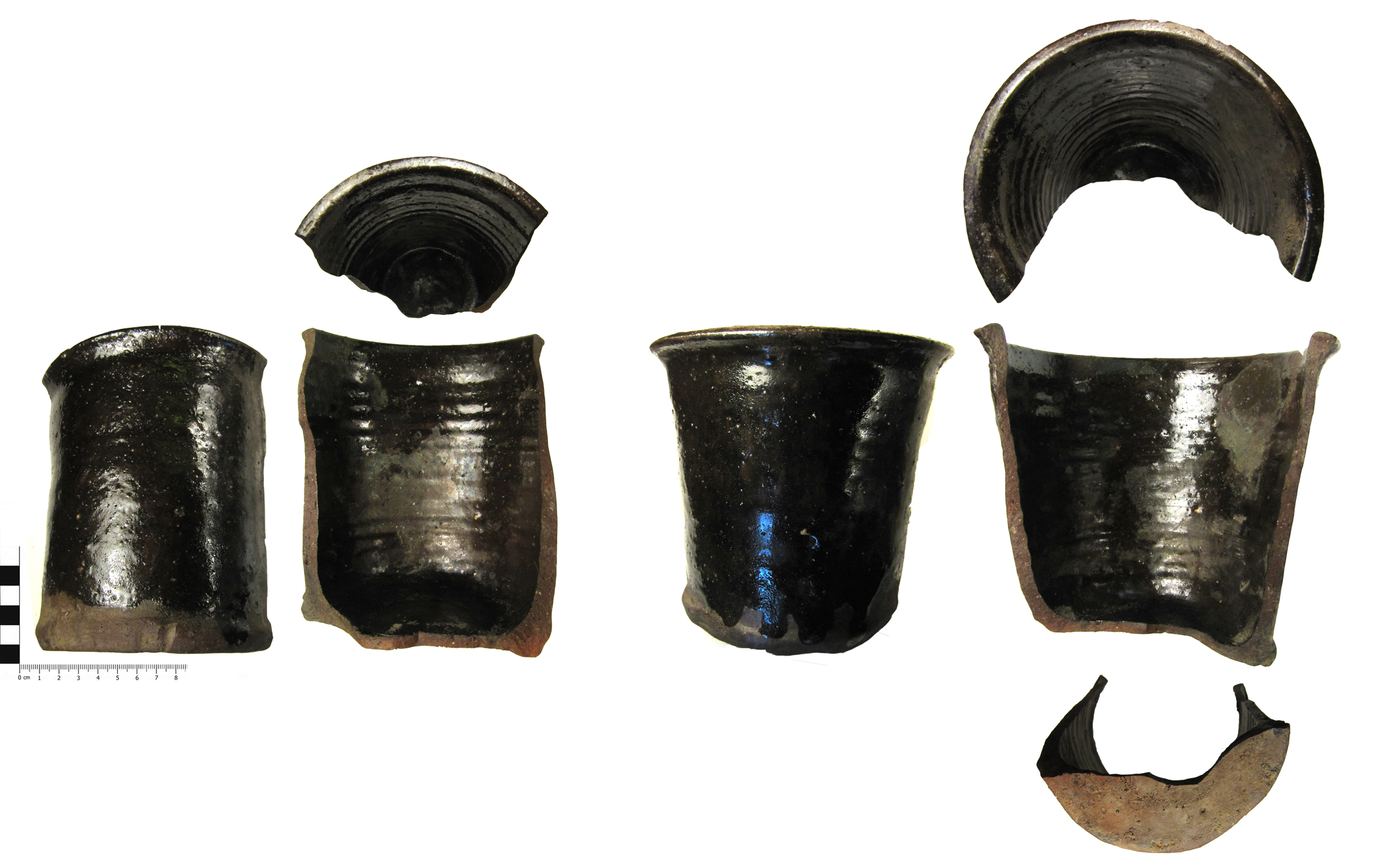
The ceramic vessels

== Acquisition and display ==
The hoard was valued at £54,492. Wakefield Council was able to raise this money through a combination of grants and public donations. The council received £27,000 from the Victoria and Albert Museum Purchase Grant, £10,000 from the Headley Trust, and £25,500 from the Heritage Lottery Fund (which includes money towards a programme of events as well as acquisition). A public funding campaign was started in Autumn 2012 to raise the remainder of the funds. A selection of the hoard first went on public display during this fundraising campaign in January 2013 at Pontefract Museum. The hoard was fully funded and acquired by Pontefract Museum in April 2013.
