= William fitz Nigel =

12th century English noble

- Died: 1134

William fitz Nigel (died 1134), of Halton Castle in Cheshire, England, was Constable of Chester and Baron of Halton within the county palatine of Chester ruled by the Earl of Chester.

== Origins ==
Traditionally, he succeeded his father Nigel as baron of Halton and Constable of Chester, although modern sources doubt the position was held by his father. He held lands in Halton, throughout Cheshire and also in Normandy. Through his heiress mother (eldest daughter of Yorfid) he obtained Widnes and the Lancashire manors of Widnes, Appleton, Cronton and Rainhill. In 1115 he established Runcorn Priory, of the Augustinian Order of Canons Regular. He died in 1134 at Halton Castle and was buried at Chester.

== Marriage and issue ==
By his wife, Agnes, daughter of Gilbert de Gant and Alice de Montfort, he had issue including:

- William (d. 1149), who succeeded his father at Halton and in the constableship, but died without issue, when Halton and the constableship passed to the descendants of his eldest sister Agnes
- Agnes, who became heiress to her childless brother William, and married Eustace fitz John by whom she had issue
- Matilda, who married Albert de Grelle and had issue
