= Pontefract de Lacys' family tree =

This is the family tree of the de Lacys of Pontefract who were the holders of both Pontefract Castle and the Honour of Pontefract from 1067 to 1348.

*Ilbert (died c1090)	Hawise
*Robert died in exile c1131)	Matilda	Hugh (2nd Abbot of Selby Abbey)
*Ilbert (died c1141)	*Henry (died 1187)	Albreda	Robert de Lissours
*Robert (died 1192)	Albreda	Richard Fitz-Eustace (constable of Chester)
John fitz Richard (died at Tyre, 1190)
*John (assumed the surname de Lacy, died 1240)	Margaret, d. of Robert de Quincey
*Edmund (died 1258)	Alesia, d. of Manfred, a Spanish Marquis
*Henry (died 1310)	Margaret, d. of William Longespée
Edmund (died young)	John (died young)	*Alice (died 1348)	Thomas, 2nd Earl of Lancaster (executed at Pontefract 1322)

* The holders of the castle and Honour of Pontefract are indicated by an asterisk.

== Sources ==
Padgett, Lorenzo, Chronicles of Old Pontefract (1905) facsimile published 1993, Old Hall Press, Leeds
