= Roger de Lacy (1170–1211) =

English baron

- Coat of arms of Roger de Lacy, recorded by Matthew Paris in Chronica Majora: Per pale gules and azure, three garbs or. It features the garbs of the Earl of Chester
- Born: 1170
- Died: 1211 (aged 40–41)
- Title: Baron of Pontefract; Lord of Bowland; Lord of Blackburnshire; Baron of Halton
- Spouse: Maud de Clere
- Children: John de Lacy, 2nd Earl of Lincoln
- Parent(s): John fitz Richard; Alice de Essex

Roger de Lacy (1170–1211), Baron of Pontefract, Lord of Bowland, Lord of Blackburnshire, Baron of Halton, Constable of Chester, Sheriff of Yorkshire and Sheriff of Cumberland, also known as Roger le Constable, was a notable Anglo-Norman soldier, Crusader and baron.

== Origins ==
Roger de Lacy was also known as Roger fitz John, and during the time that he was hoping to inherit his grandmother's de Lisours lands as Roger de Lisours. He was the son of John fitz Richard, Baron of Halton, Lord of Bowland, Lord of Flamborough and Constable of Chester, and his wife, Alice of Essex.

== Career ==
Roger became Baron of Pontefract on the death of his paternal grandmother Albreda de Lisours (died after 1194) who had inherited the Barony in her own right as first cousin and heir to Robert de Lacy (died 1193), Baron of Pontefract. In agreements with his grandmother Roger adopted the name of de Lacy in 1193, received the right to inherit the Barony of Pontefract and its lands, and the lands of Bowland and Blackburnshire. He gave up all claims to his grandmother's de Lisours lands. He also gave his younger brother Robert le Constable the Flamborough lands that he had inherited from his father.

=== Service to kings Richard and John ===
Roger's great-great-grandfather, Robert de Lacy, had failed to support King Henry I during his power struggle with his brother and the king had confiscated Pontefract Castle from the family earlier in the 12th century; Roger paid King Richard I 3,000 marks for the Honour of Pontefract, though the king retained possession of the castle itself. It has been claimed that Roger accompanied his father and King Richard for the Third Crusade, succeeding to the title when his father died at the siege of Tyre. This is undermined by Roger witnessing a number of the Ranulph, Earl of Chester's charters in England during the same period, such as the confirmation of Bordesley Abbey and the liberties of Stanlow Abbey. Roger is also mentioned in a contemporary account of the rebellion of Count John so it is highly unlikely that he travelled East.

=== Siege of Acre ===
Roger took over as the Constable of Chester, freeing his father John fitz Richard, to join Richard the Lionheart for the Third Crusade. Roger's uncle, Robert Thesaurus, was prior of the Hospitallers of England, but it is unclear if he joined the Third Crusade. John died at the Siege of Acre, in 1190.

=== Accession of King John ===
At the accession of King John of England, Roger was a person of great eminence, for we find him shortly after the coronation of that prince, deputed with the Sheriff of Northumberland, and other great men, to conduct William, King of Scotland, to Lincoln, where the English king had fixed to give him an interview. King John gave de Lacy Pontefract Castle in 1199, the year he ascended the throne.

=== Château Gaillard ===
King Richard had reconquered some castles along his Norman border from Philip II of France in 1196 and de Lacy was likely in his retinue. In 1203, de Lacy was the commander of the Château Gaillard in Normandy, when it was besieged and finally taken by Philip, marking the loss of mainland Normandy by the Plantagenêts. Under de Lacy's command the defence of the castle was lengthy, and it fell only after an eight-month siege on 8 March 1204. After the siege, de Lacy returned to England to begin work reinforcing Pontefract Castle.

=== Siege of Rhuddlan ===
In the time of this Roger, Ranulph, Earl of Chester, having entered Wales at the head of some forces, was compelled, by superior numbers, to shut himself up in Rhuddlan Castle, where, being closely besieged by the Welsh, he sent for aid to the Constable of Chester. A century earlier, Hugh Lupus, the 1st Earl of Chester, in his charter of foundation of the Abbey of St. Werberg at Chester, had given a privilege to the frequenters of Chester fair, "That they should not be apprehended for theft, or any other offense during the time of the fair, unless the crime was committed therein." The fair thus became a haven for thieves and vagabonds. When Roger de Lacy was called upon for assistance, he raised from the fair a group of minstrels and other 'loose characters' and brought them to Rhuddlan. The besiegers, mistaking this host for an army, immediately raised the siege. As a reward for this service, the Earl of Chester conferred upon de Lacy and his heirs the patronage of the region's minstrels, which patronage de Lacy subsequently transferred to his steward Hugh Dutton.

=== High Sheriff ===
Roger was appointed Sheriff of Cumberland for the years 1204 to 1209.

== Marriage and issue ==
Roger married Maud de Clere, and they had the following children:

- John de Lacy, 2nd Earl of Lincoln
- a daughter who married Alan Fitz Roland of Galloway and Constable of Scotland

== Death and succession ==
Roger died in 1211 and was buried at Stanlow Abbey in Cheshire.
