= John fitz Richard =

Anglo-Norman soldier

- Arms of John fitz Richard: Quarterly or and gules overall bend sable a label of five points argent for difference
- Successor: Roger de Lacy
- Died: 11 October 1190
- Spouse: Alice de Essex
- Issue Detail: Roger de Lacy
- Parents: Richard fitz Eustace; Albreda de Lisours

John fitz Richard (died 11 October 1190) was an Anglo-Norman soldier, Baron of Halton and hereditary Constable of Chester. Historical records refer to him as "John, Constable of Chester". He died at Acre in the Holy Land.

== Origins ==
John was the eldest son and heir of Richard fitz Eustace (d. 1163), hereditary Constable of Chester, and his wife Albreda de Lisours (d. 1194), daughter of Robert de Lissours. His younger brother Roger fitz Richard was Lord of Warkworth Castle and another brother, Robert fitz Richard, was the prior of the Knights Hospitaller in England.

== Career ==
After the death of his father in 1163, John inherited his Barony of Halton and the Office of Constable of Chester, whereupon he became the chief official of Hugh de Kevelioc, 5th Earl of Chester. After the death of Hugh in 1181, he served in the same capacity for his heir Ranulf de Blondeville, 6th Earl of Chester. In 1166 he paid a fee of 1,000 marks to obtain his mother's possessions, including the former de Lacy estates. After 1172 he founded Stanlow Abbey in Cheshire, of the Cistercian order, and a hospital in Castle Donington. Earl Hugh granted him lands in Antrobus, Cheshire and in 1178 confirmed John's donation of Little Stanney to Stanlow Abbey, and a little later he gave the monks the duty to pay in Chester.

During the rebellion against King Henry II in 1173, John was a loyal supporter of the king. In early May 1181, when Hugh de Lacy, Lord of Meath lost the King's favour and was removed from office as Justiciar of Ireland, John was sent to Ireland together with Richard Peche, Bishop of Coventry to take control of Dublin. Nevertheless, they supported Hugh before he left Ireland in the construction of many castles in Leinster. The following winter John and Bishop Peche were recalled to England, while Hugh de Lacy returned to Ireland. On 3 September 1189, John took part in the coronation of King Richard I. In March 1190, he left England to participate in the Third Crusade, during which he died in the Holy Land during the Siege of Acre.

== Marriage and issue ==
John married Alice of Essex, a daughter of Robert of Essex and his wife Alice. John and Alice had several children, including:

- Roger de Lacy (1170–1211), eldest son and heir, known in his youth as "Roger fitz John". In 1194 his paternal grandmother Aubrey/Albreda de Lissours surrendered to him the feudal barony of Pontefract in Yorkshire, which she had inherited from her mother Aubrey/Albreda de Lacy. Thereupon he adopted the surname "de Lacy".
- Richard of Chester, buried in Norton Priory
- Geoffrey fitz John
- Robert of Flamborough
- Eustace of Chester, possibly illegitimate.
