= Stanlow Abbey =

Monastery in Cheshire, England

Coordinates: 53.290°N 2.860°W

The Abbey of St. Mary at Stanlaw (or Stanlow as it has been posthumously known since a Victorian cartographical error), was a Cistercian foundation situated on Stanlaw - now Stanlow Point, on the banks of the River Mersey in the Wirral Peninsula, Cheshire, England (grid reference SJ427773), near Ellesmere Port, 11 km north of Chester Castle and 12 km south-west of Halton Castle.

== History ==
The abbey was founded in 1178 by John fitz Richard, Baron of Halton and Hereditary Constable of Chester, as a daughter abbey of Combermere Abbey. In August 1277, King Edward I of England stayed there for three nights.

Stanlaw Abbey was in an exposed situation near the Mersey estuary and it suffered from a series of disasters. In 1279 it was flooded by water from the Mersey and in 1287 during a fierce storm, its tower collapsed and part of the abbey was destroyed by fire. The monks appealed to the pope for the monastery to be moved to a better site and thus, with both papal consent and the agreement of Edward I and Henry de Lacy, 10th Baron Halton, they moved to Whalley near Clitheroe, Lancashire. This move took place in 1296. However, a small cell of monks remained on the site until the Reformation, the site becoming a grange of Whalley Abbey. The remains of the abbey lie on Stanlow Island marooned between the Mersey and the Manchester Ship Canal. The standing remains include two sandstone walls and a re-used doorway, and the buried features include part of a drain leading to the River Gowy. These remains are recognised as a scheduled monument.

The abbey was purchased by Mr John Wright (previously of The Wheelwright Public House, Elton, Cheshire) who turned the building into three dwellings for some of his children. The family resided on Stanlow until a compulsory purchase order was placed on the island to make way for the oil refinery.

== Burials ==
Roger de Lacy, John de Lacy and Edmund de Lacy, respectively the 7th, 8th and 9th Barons of Halton, were buried at Stanlow.

== See also ==
- List of Scheduled Monuments in Cheshire (1066–1539)
