= Ilbert II de Lacy =

12th century English noble

- Baron of Pontefract
- Died: 1141
- Buried: Pontefract Priory
- Noble family: de Lacy family
- Spouse: Alice de Gant
- Father: Robert de Lacy
- Mother: Maud de Perche

Ilbert II de Lacy (died 1141), Baron of Pontefract and Lord of Bowland, was an English noble.

Ilbert was the eldest son of Robert de Lacy and Maud de Perche. Ilbert with his father, supported Robert Curthose against the claims of Henry I to the English crown. Upon Henry’s succession, he dispossessed the Lacy’s of all their estates and banished Robert and Ilbert from England.

Robert and Ilbert were allowed to return after a few years of exile, with their lands and titles returned. He was a supporter of King Stephen during the Anarchy. Ilbert was noted for his valour at the Battle of the Standard in 1138 and was captured at the Battle of Lincoln in 1141. He disappears from records shortly afterwards, possibly dying in captivity or from wounds suffered during the battle. Ilbert died without issue and his brother Henry, succeeded to his titles. His widow Alice de Gant, daughter of Walter de Gant and Mathilde de Penthièvre, remarried Roger de Mowbray. Ilbert was buried at Pontefract Priory, next to his mother.
