= Hugh de Lacy =

Hugh de Lacy or Hugh Lacy may refer to:

- Hugh de Lacy, Lord of Lassy (c. 1020–1085), first recorded member of the Norman noble family de Lacy
- Hugh de Lacy, Lord of Meath (died 1186), 4th Baron Lacy
- Hugh de Lacy, Abbot of Shrewsbury (died c. 1215/18)
- Hugh de Lacy, 1st Earl of Ulster (c. 1176–1242), younger son of Hugh de Lacy, Lord of Meath
- Hugh De Lacy (politician) (1910–1986), American politician
- Hugh Lacy (bishop) (died 1580), Anglican bishop in Ireland
- Hugh Lacy (1943–1998), 3rd baronet of the Lacy baronets
- Hugh de Lacy (rugby union)
