= Donington Castle =

Coordinates: 52.84405°N 1.33630°W

Donington Castle was in the village of Castle Donington in Leicestershire, England to the north of East Midlands Airport (grid reference SK448276).

This early 12th-century castle was held by the de Lacy family. It was attacked around the time of Magna Carta. In 1311 it passed to Thomas, Earl of Lancaster, the cousin of Edward II and eventually become Crown property. Any remains have now been incorporated into Donington House.
