= Pontefract cake =

Type of liquorice sweet

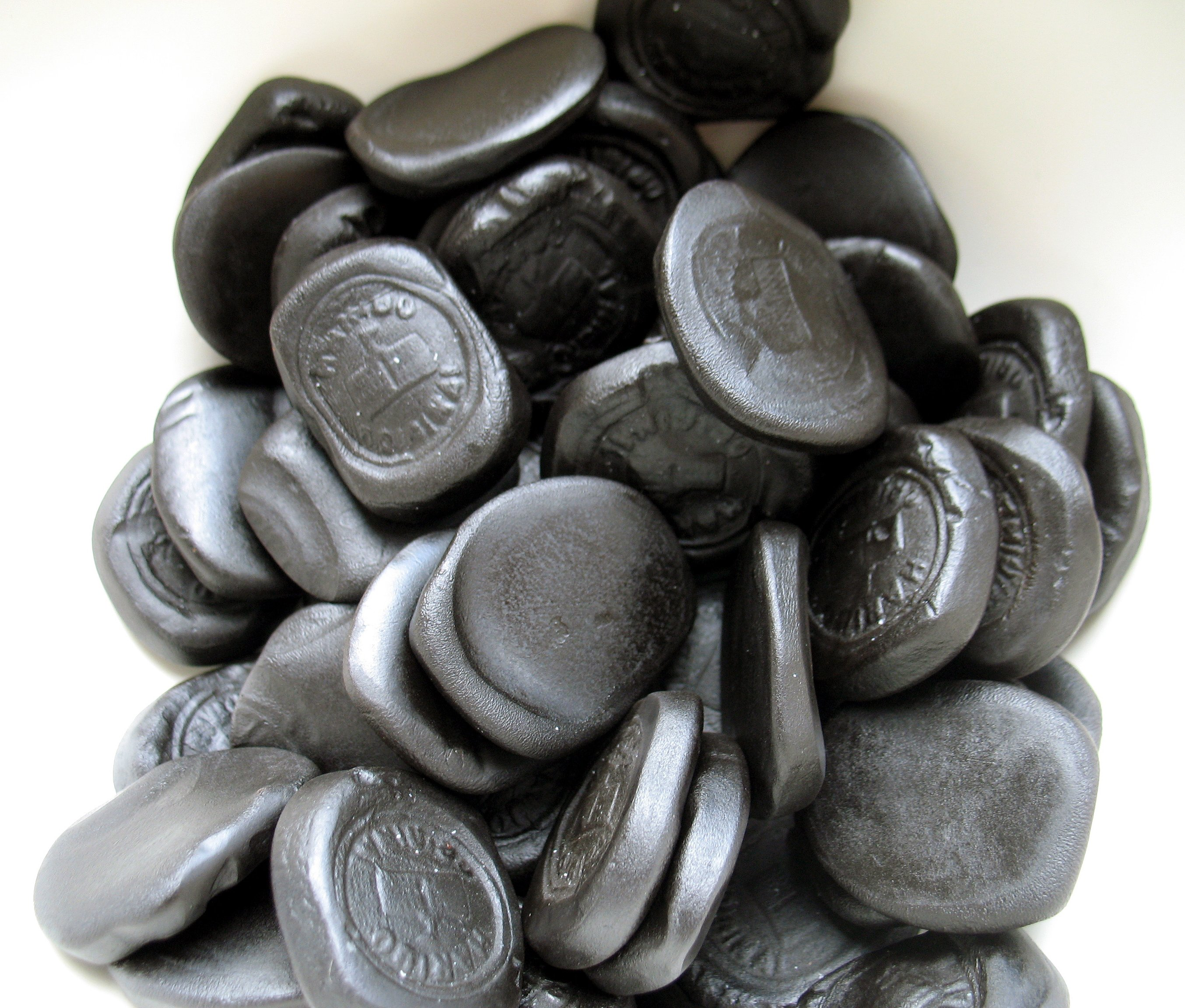
- A pile of Pontefract cakes
- Alternative names: Pomfret cake, Pomfrey cake
- Type: Confectionery
- Place of origin: England
- Region or state: Yorkshire
- Main ingredients: Liquorice

Pontefract cakes (also known as Pomfret cakes and Pomfrey cakes) are a type of small, roughly circular black liquorice sweet. They measure approximately 0.75 in (19 mm) wide and 0.16 in (4 mm) thick (similar to a pastille), and were originally manufactured in the West Yorkshire town of Pontefract, England.

== Name ==
The original name for these small tablets of liquorice is Pomfret cake, after the old Norman name for the town of Pontefract. However, that name has fallen into disuse and the sweets are now almost invariably labelled Pontefract cakes.

The term cake has a long history. The word itself is of Germanic origin, from the Germanic "kakâ" (cook).

== History ==
The exact origins of liquorice growing in England remain uncertain. However, by the 16th century there is record of the activity, possibly via monastic gardens and as a garden crop for the gentry. During the 17th century, it was recorded as being grown in areas with alluvial soil overlying magnesian limestone, such as in Surrey, Lincolnshire, Nottinghamshire and Yorkshire. Camden's Britannia of 1607 noted the crop in Worksop and Pontefract. By 1780, liquorice growing was concentrated almost wholly in Pontefract and in Surrey, around Godalming.

In Pontefract, the growing of liquorice was done on plots of land behind people's houses. In a map of the 1648 Siege of Pontefract (reproduced by Chartres), the liquorice is indicated as being grown in "garths" either side of Micklegate; the street runs between Pontefract's Market Place and the castle.

In the 18th century, liquorice was used as a medicine both for humans and for horses. The Pontefract cake "was almost certainly a black cake, the portable lozenge used to make 'liquorish water', stamped with the castle lodge emblem of Pontefract to signify quality. This trade mark had been employed on Pontefract cakes since 1612, when the initials GS were used, and are thought to be those of Sir George Savile, major local landowner; and a second die-stamp from 1720." It was only in the 19th century that it was used extensively for confectionery. Of the merchants in the 18th century, apothecary chemist George Dunhill (later bought by German confectioner Haribo) was the most important.

In 1760, Dunhill added sugar to the medicinal liquorice; he was also a grower of liquorice. It was not until 1810 that Firth Confectioners (eventually known as Ewbanks) joined Dunhill in producing sweet liquorice.

With the growth of Pontefract cakes as confectionery, the demand for liquorice outstripped the capacity of Pontefract growers to supply. By the late 19th century, the 12 firms producing liquorice confectionery relied mainly on extract imported largely from Turkey.

== Production and design ==
Originally, the sweets were embossed by hand with a stamp, to form their traditional look (the workers who did this were known as "cakers" and were able to produce upwards of 30,000 per day), but now they are usually machinery formed. The embossed stamp was originally a stylised image of Pontefract Castle with a raven on the top bar, which is thought to have been in use for almost 400 years. When the first secret ballot in the United Kingdom was held in Pontefract on 15 August 1872; the ballot box used was sealed using a Pontefract cake stamp from Frank Dunhill's factory, which shows the image of a castle and an owl.

== Health warning ==
In 2004, healthcare professionals warned against overindulgence in Pontefract cake after a 56-year-old woman was admitted to hospital following an overdose. The woman consumed about 200 grams (7.1 oz) daily, leading to dangerously low potassium levels and subsequent muscle failure. Earlier in 2004, the European Commission had recommended limiting consumption of the active ingredient, glycyrrhizic acid, to 100 mg or less per day.

== Literary references ==
In Elizabeth Gaskell's 1866 novel Wives and Daughters, Mr Gibson, the local doctor and one of the main characters, has the following exchange with the father of one of his apprentices:

"Must my boy make the pills himself then?" asked the major ruefully.

"To be sure. The youngest apprentice always does. It's not hard work. He'll have the comfort of thinking he won't have to swallow them himself. And he'll have the run of the pomfret cakes, and the conserve of hips, and on Sundays he shall have a taste of tamarinds to reward him for his weekly labour at pill making."
