= Pontefract Castle =

Castle in West Yorkshire, England

Coordinates: 53°41′44″N 1°18′14″W

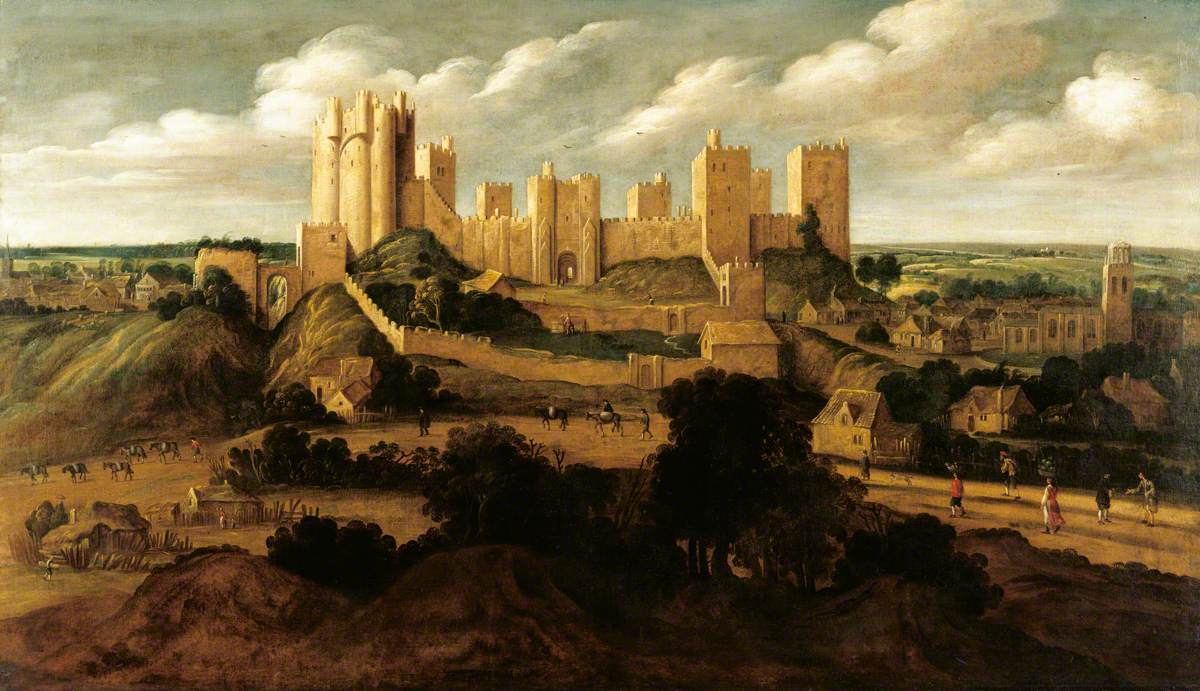
Painting in Pontefract Museum of Pontefract Castle in the early 17th century, by Alexander Keirincx

Pontefract (or Pomfret) Castle is a castle ruin in the town of Pontefract, in West Yorkshire, England. King Richard II is thought to have died there. It was the site of a series of sieges during the 17th-century English Civil War.

Pontefract Castle is owned by the Duchy of Lancaster and managed by Wakefield Council.

== History ==
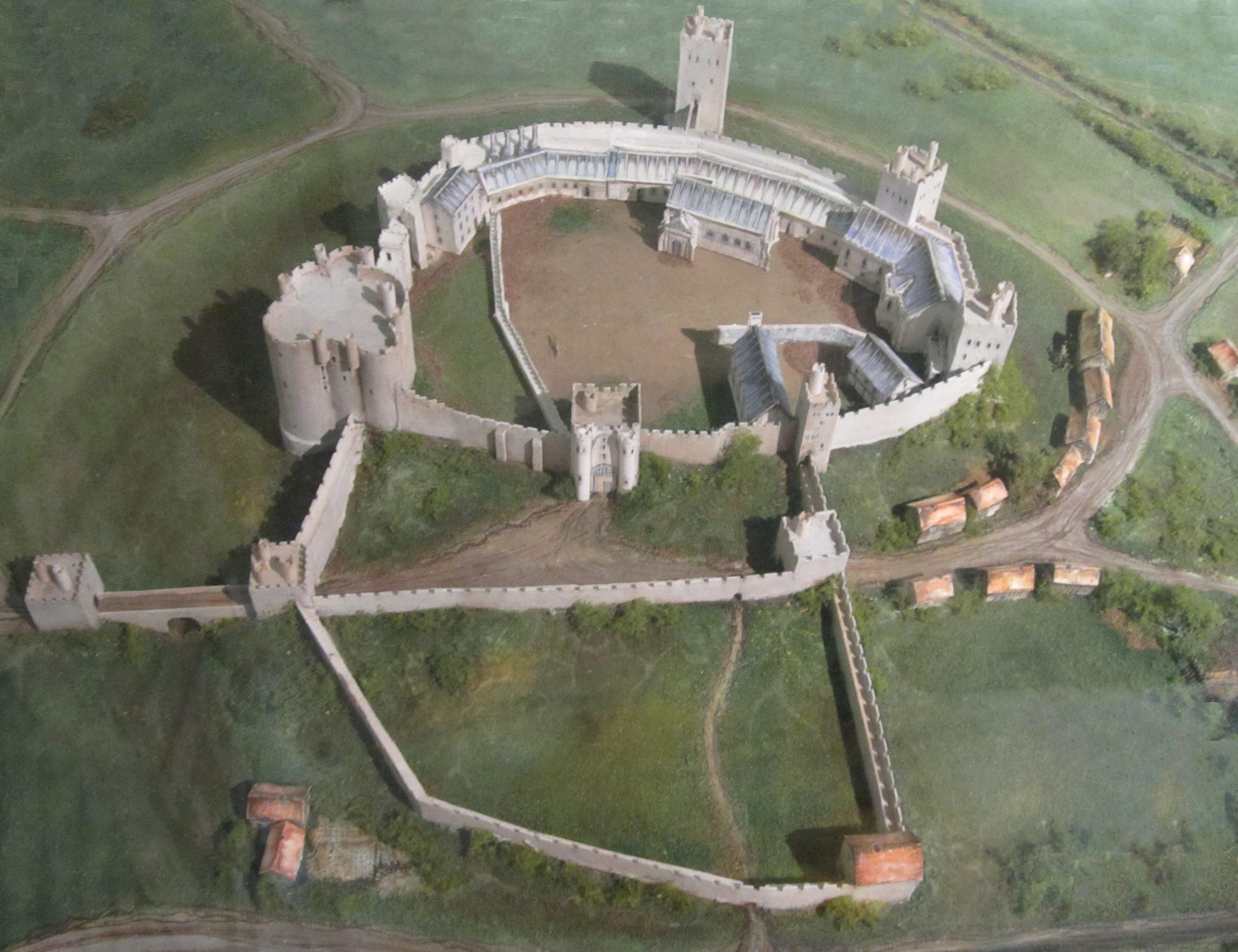
Model reconstructing Pontefract Castle

The castle, on a rock to the east of the town above All Saints' Church, was constructed in approximately 1070 by Ilbert de Lacy on land which had been granted to him by William the Conqueror as a reward for his support during the Norman Conquest. There is, however, evidence of earlier occupation of the site. Initially the castle was a wooden structure which was replaced with stone over time. The Domesday Survey of 1086 recorded "Ilbert's Castle" which probably referred to Pontefract Castle.

Robert de Lacy failed to support King Henry I during his power struggle with his brother, and the King confiscated the castle from the family during the 12th century. Roger de Lacy paid King Richard I 3,000 marks for the Honour of Pontefract, but the King retained possession of the castle. His successor King John gave de Lacy the castle in 1199, the year John ascended the throne. Roger died in 1213 and was succeeded by his eldest son, John. However, the King took possession of Castle Donington and Pontefract Castle. The de Lacys lived in the castle until the early 14th century. It was under the tenure of the de Lacys that the magnificent multilobate donjon was built.

In 1311 the castle passed by marriage to the estates of the House of Lancaster. Thomas, Earl of Lancaster (circa 1278–1322) was beheaded outside the castle walls six days after his defeat at the Battle of Boroughbridge, a sentence placed on him by King Edward II himself in the great hall. This resulted in the earl becoming a martyr with his tomb at Pontefract Priory becoming a shrine. It next went to Henry, Duke of Lancaster and subsequently to John of Gaunt, third son of King Edward III. He made the castle his personal residence, spending vast amounts of money improving it.

=== Richard II ===
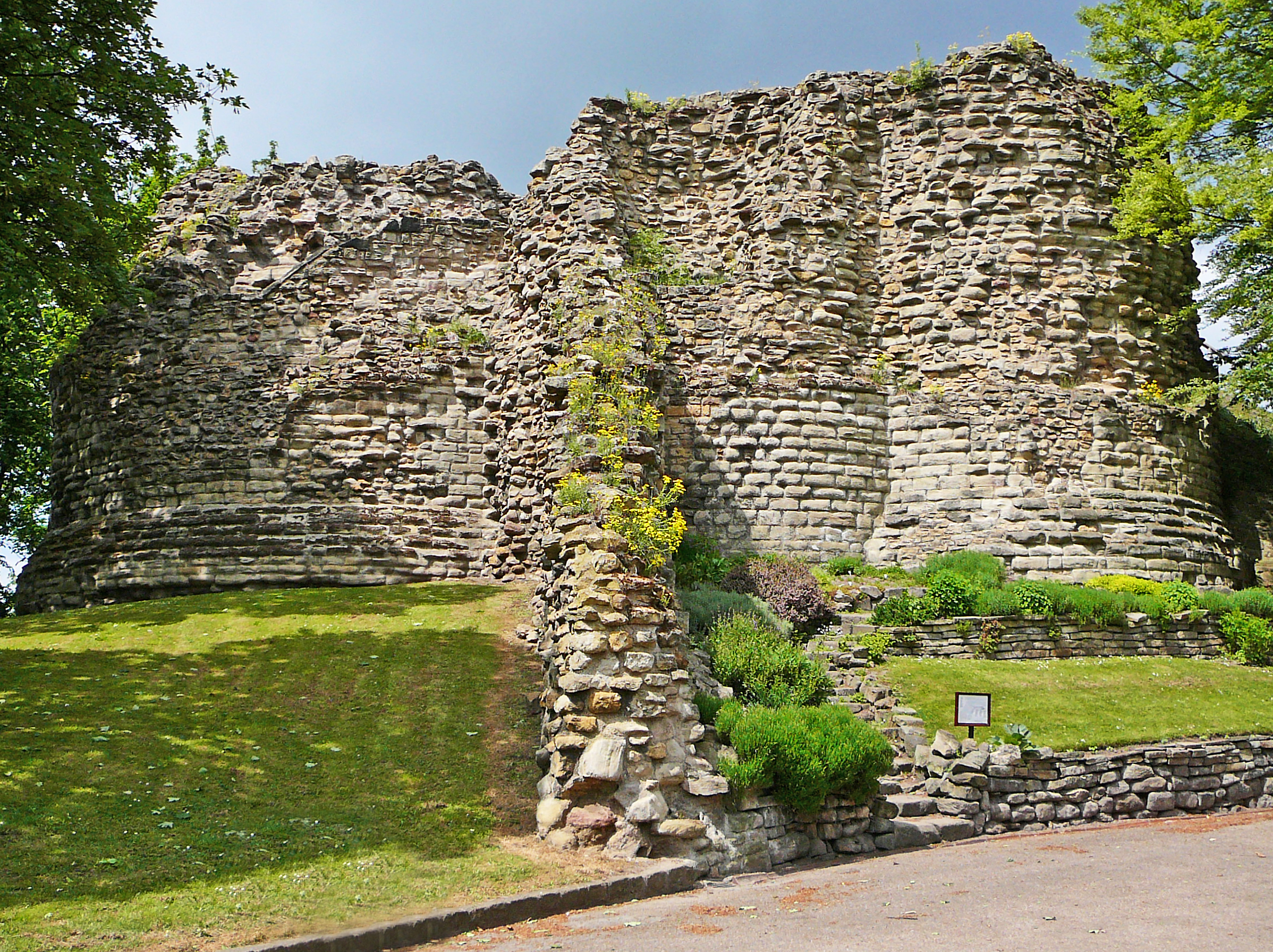
The ruins of Pontefract Castle's keep

In the closing years of the 14th century, Richard II banished John of Gaunt's son Henry Bolingbroke, Duke of Hereford, from England. Following the death of John of Gaunt, Duke of Lancaster, in 1399, Richard II seized much of the property due to Bolingbroke. Richard then shared some of the seized property around among his favourites. The castle at Pontefract was among such properties which was under threat. These events aroused Bolingbroke to return to England to claim his rights to the Duchy of Lancaster and the properties of his father. Shakespeare's play Richard II (Act 2, scene 1, 277) relates Bolingbroke's homecoming in the words of Northumberland in the speech of the eight tall ships:-

NORTHUMBERLAND
Then thus: I have from Port Le Blanc,
A bay in Brittany, receiv'd intelligence,
That Harry Duke of Herford, Rainold Lord Cobham,
Thomas, son and heir to th' Earl of Arundel,
That late broke from the Duke of Exeter,
His brother, Archbishop late of Canterbury,
Sir Thomas Erpingham, Sir John Ramston,
Sir John Norbery, Sir Robert Waterton, and Francis Quoint—
All these, well furnished by the Duke of Brittany
With eight tall ships, three thousand men of war,
Are making hither with all due expedience,
And shortly mean to touch our northern shore

When Bolingbroke landed at Ravenspur on the Humber, he made straight way for his castle at Pontefract. King Richard II, being in Ireland at the time, was in no position to oppose Bolingbroke. Bolingbroke soon deposed Richard and took the crown for himself as Henry IV.

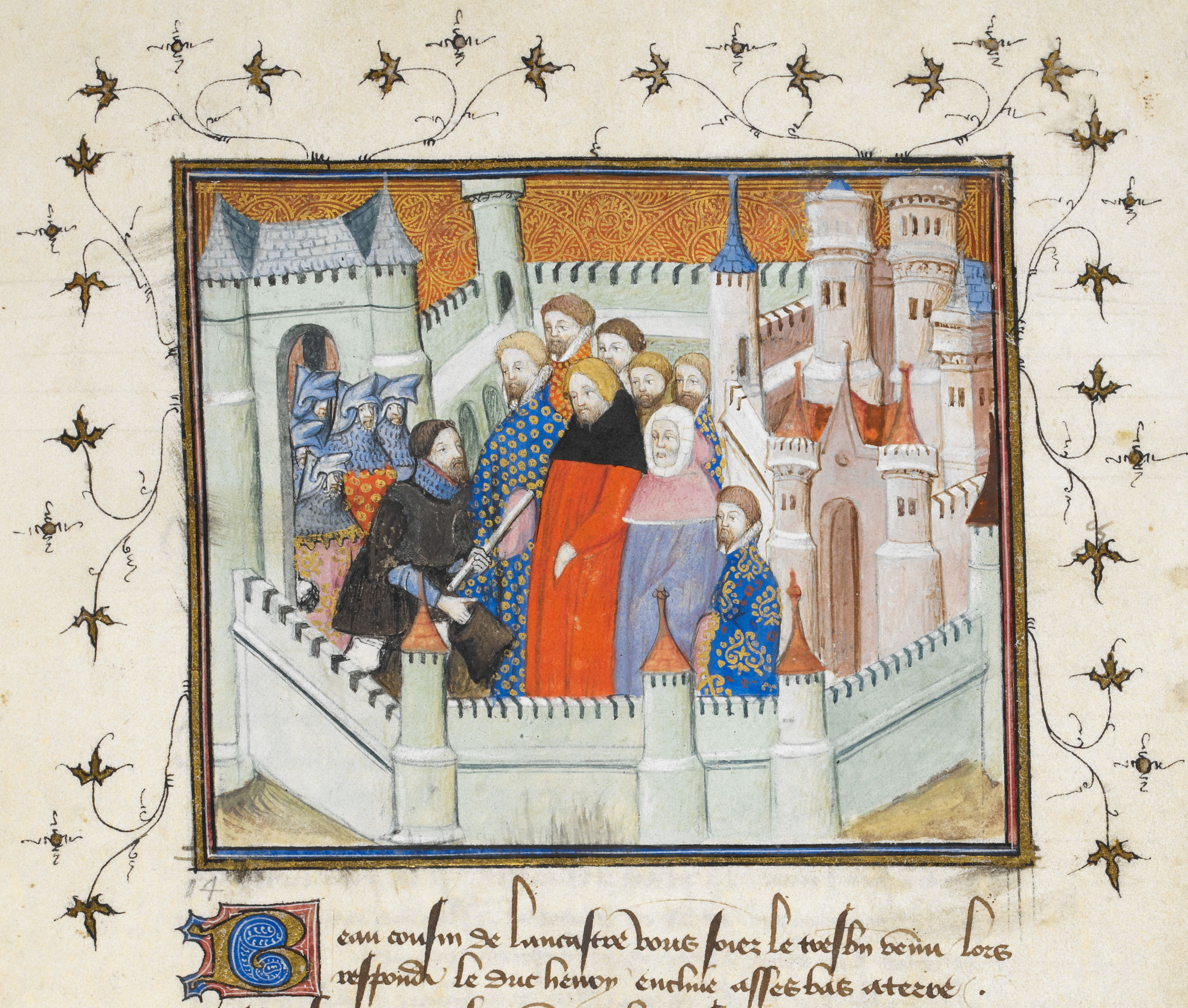
Richard II was captured at Flint on 16 August 1399 and imprisoned.

Richard II was captured by Henry Bolingbroke's supporters in August 1399 and was initially imprisoned in the Tower of London. Sometime before Christmas that year he was moved to Pontefract Castle (via Knaresborough) where he remained under guard until his death, perhaps on 14 February 1400. William Shakespeare's play Richard III mentions this incident:

Pomfret, Pomfret! O thou bloody prison,
Fatal and ominous to noble peers!
Within the guilty closure of thy walls
Richard the second here was hack'd to death;
And, for more slander to thy dismal seat,
We give thee up our guiltless blood to drink.

Various chroniclers suggest that Richard was starved to death by his captors, and others suggest he starved himself. A contemporary French chronicler suggested that Richard II had been hacked to death, but this is, according to the ODNB, "almost certainly fictitious".

=== Richard III ===
Richard III had two relatives of Elizabeth Woodville beheaded at Pontefract Castle on 25 June 1483 – her son, Sir Richard Grey, and her brother, Anthony Woodville, 2nd Earl Rivers.

=== Tudor Era ===
In 1536, the castle's guardian, Thomas Darcy, 1st Baron Darcy de Darcy handed over the castle to the leaders of the Pilgrimage of Grace, a Catholic rebellion from northern England against the rule of King Henry VIII. Lord Darcy was executed for this alleged "surrender", which the king viewed as an act of treason.

King Henry VIII of England stayed at the castle arriving on 23 August 1541 during his summer royal progress of the North. It was alleged during his visit that Henry VIII's fifth wife, Catherine Howard, committed her first act of adultery with Sir Thomas Culpeper at Pontefract Castle, for which she was later apprehended and beheaded at the Tower of London without trial. Mary, Queen of Scots was lodged at the castle on 28 January 1569, travelling between Wetherby and Rotherham.

=== Royalist stronghold ===
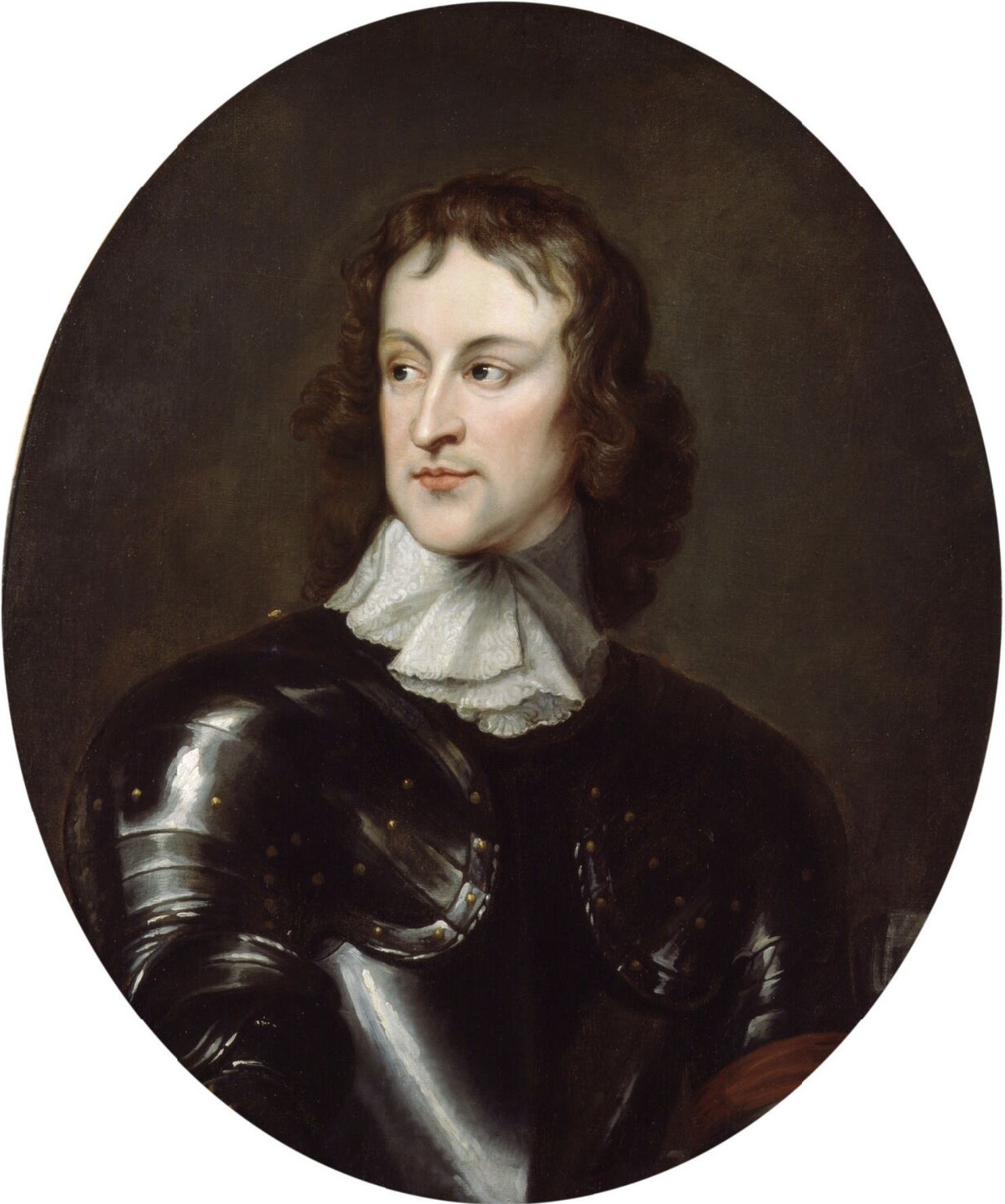
The garrison handed over the castle to John Lambert on 24 March 1649.

On his way south to London, King James rode from Grimston Park to view Pontefract Castle on 19 April 1603 and stayed the night at the Bear Inn at Doncaster. The castle was included in English jointure property of his wife, Anne of Denmark.

Royalists controlled Pontefract Castle at the start of the English Civil War. The first of three sieges began in December 1644 and continued until the following March when Marmaduke Langdale, 1st Baron Langdale of Holme arrived with Royalist reinforcements and the Parliamentarian army retreated. During the siege, mining and artillery caused damage and the Piper Tower collapsed as a result. The second siege began on 21 March 1645, shortly after the end of the first siege, and the garrison surrendered in July after hearing the news of Charles I's defeat at the Battle of Naseby. Parliament garrisoned the castle until June 1648 when Royalists sneaked into the castle and took control. Pontefract Castle was an important base for the Royalists, and raiding parties harried Parliamentarians in the area.

Oliver Cromwell led the final siege of Pontefract Castle in November 1648. Charles I was executed in January, and Pontefract's garrison came to an agreement and Colonel Morrice handed over the castle to Major General John Lambert on 24 March 1649. Following requests from the townspeople, the grand jury at York, and Major General Lambert, on 27 March Parliament gave orders that Pontefract Castle should be "totally demolished & levelled to the ground" and materials from the castle would be sold off. Piecemeal dismantling after the main organised activity of slighting may have further contributed to the castle's ruined state.

It is still possible to visit the castle's 11th-century cellars, which were used to store military equipment during the civil war.

== Preservation ==
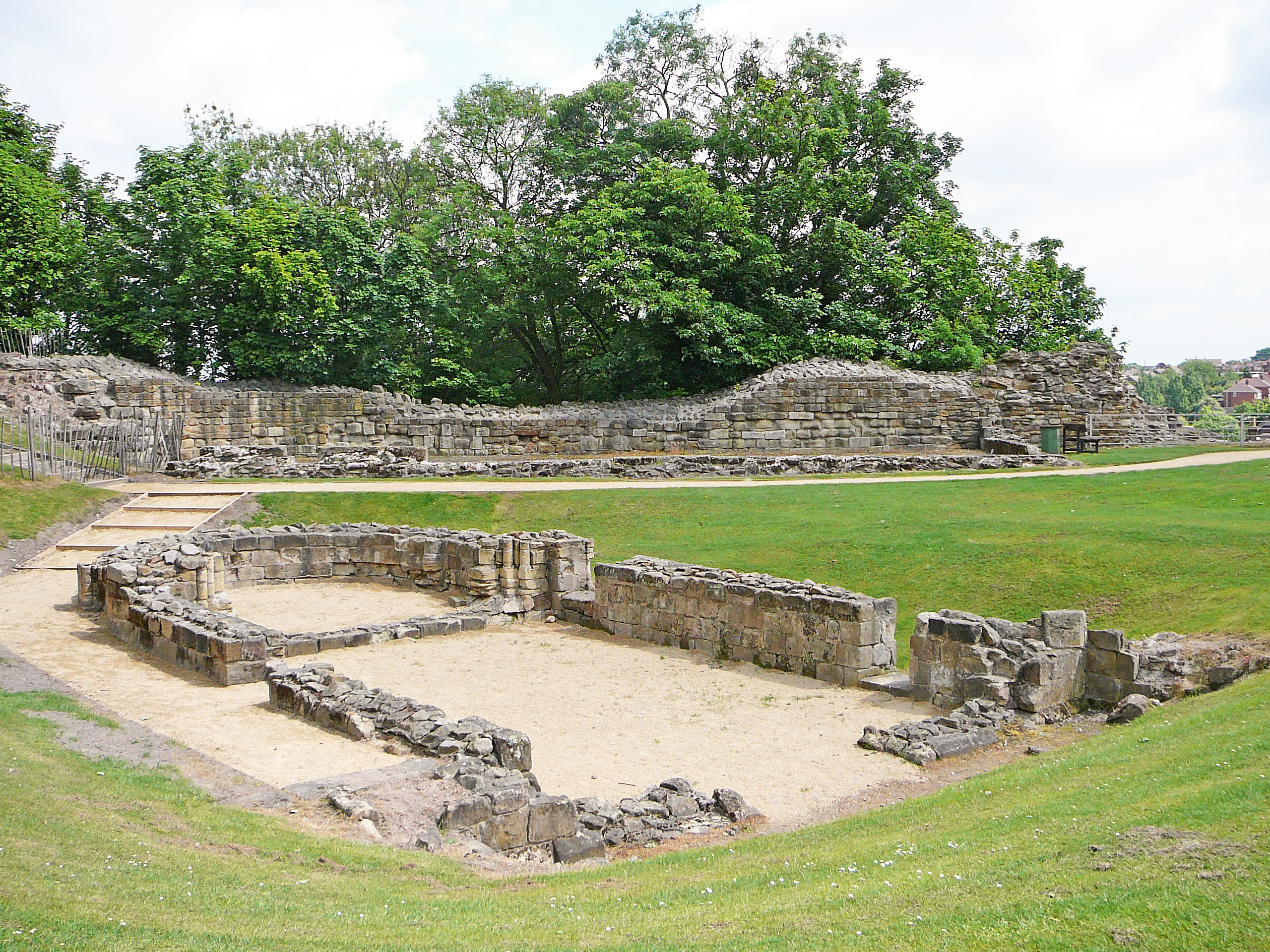
The ruins of St Clement's Chapel within the castle

Little survives of what "must have been one of the most impressive castles in Yorkshire" other than parts of the curtain wall and excavated and tidied inner walls. It had inner and outer baileys. Parts of a 12th-century wall and the Piper Tower's postern gate and the foundations of a chapel are the oldest remains. The ruins of the Round Tower or keep are on the 11th-century mound. The Great Gate flanked by 14th-century semi-circular towers had inner and outer barbicans. Chambers excavated into the rock in the inner bailey possibly indicate the site of the old hall and the North Bailey gate is marked by the remains of a rectangular tower.

The castle has several unusual features. The donjon has a rare Quatrefoil design. Other examples of this type of Keep are Clifford's Tower, York and at the Château d'Étampes in France. Pontefract also has a torre albarrana, a fortification almost unknown outside the Iberian Peninsula. Known as the Swillington Tower, the detached tower was attached to the north wall by a bridge. Its purpose was to increase the defender's range of flanking fire.

Wakefield Council, who manage the site, commissioned William Anelay Ltd to begin repairs on the castle in September 2015, but work stopped in November 2016 when Anelay went into administration. The Council then engaged Heritage Building & Conservation (North) Ltd, who began work on the site in March 2017. A new visitor centre and cafe were opened in July 2017; but in April 2018 the council announced that they had terminated the contract with HB&C (North) Ltd, as no work had been done since mid-March, and they had not had any reassurances that the work would restart. On Yorkshire Day 2019, the restoration was completed, and the castle was removed from Historic England's "Heritage At Risk" list.

Excavations led by DigVentures in 2019–20 in the castle's drawbridge pit uncovered numerous mason's marks on the structure, as well as lead shot dating to the Civil War.

== See also ==
- Castles in Great Britain and Ireland
- List of castles in England
- Pontefract cakes
