= Pontefract Priory =

Vanished mediaeval monastery in Yorkshire

Coordinates: 53°42′06″N 1°18′27″W

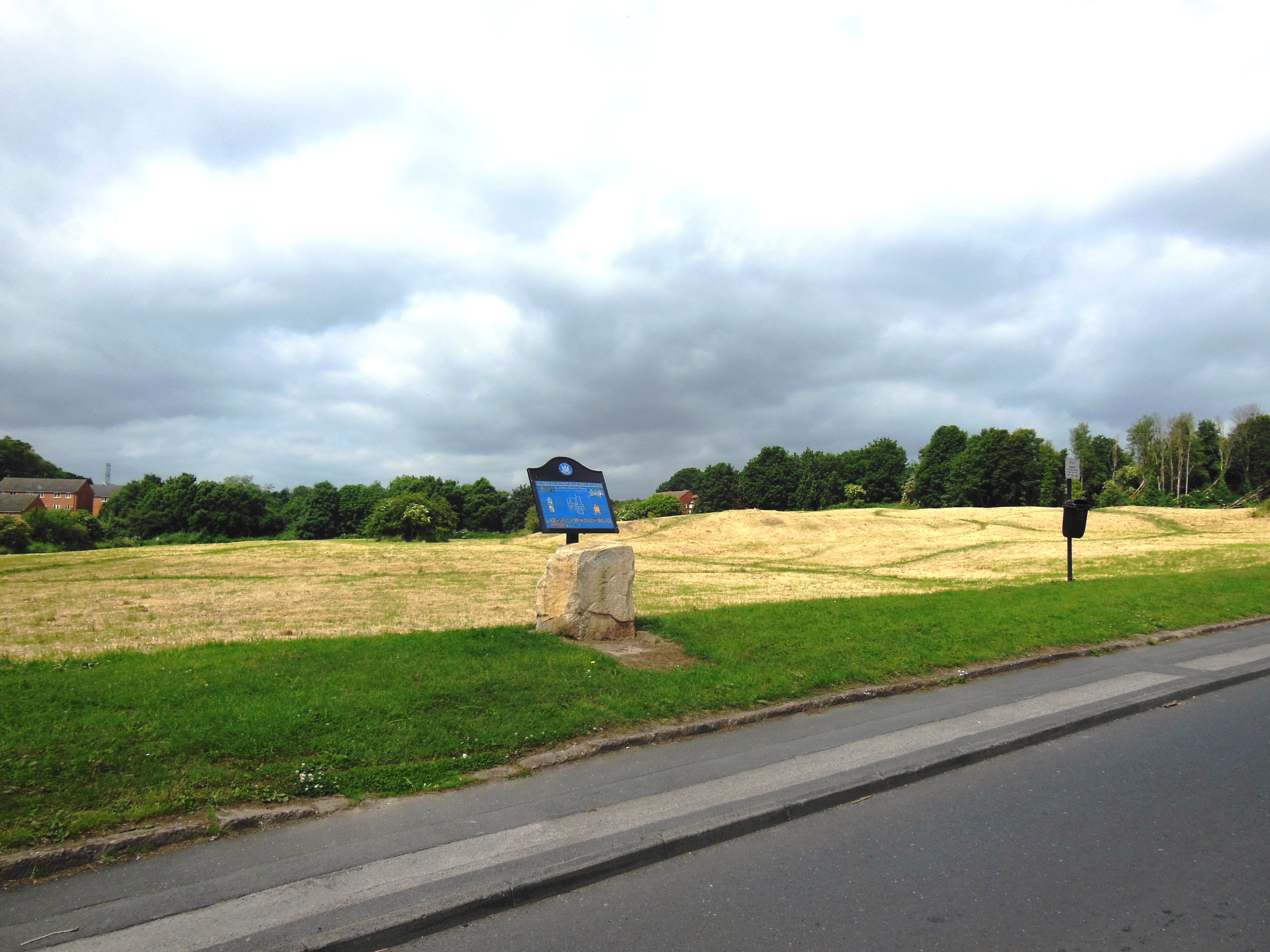
Site of the former priory (2013)

Pontefract Priory was a Cluniac monastery dedicated to St. John the Evangelist, founded about 1090 by Robert de Lacy, 2nd Baron of Pontefract, and located in Yorkshire, England. It existed until the dissolution of the monasteries. The church and buildings have been completely destroyed, but the site is still indicated by the name of Monk-hill.

== History ==
The priory was a dependency of the Abbey of la Charité-sur-Loire, which supplied the first monks. The Cartulary of the priory survives and is a primary source for its history. Two charters of the founder are cited in a history by William Dugdale. In a charter of Henry de Lacy, 4th Baron of Pontefract, son of Robert, the church is spoken of as dedicated to St. Mary and St. John. These donations were finally confirmed to the monastery by a Bull of Pope Celestine (whether II or III is uncertain), which also conferred certain ecclesiastical privileges on the priory.

In the Visitation Records it had 16 monks in 1262, and 27 in 1279. At the latter date a prior of exceptional ability was in charge of the house, and he is commended for his zeal during the twelve years of his rule, which had resulted in a reduction of the monastery's debts from 3200 marks to 350. A later, undated, visitation return gives the average number of monks at 20. Duckett prints a letter from Stephen, Prior of Pontefract in 1323, to Pierre, Abbot of Cluny, explaining that he had been prevented from making a visitation of the English Cluniac houses, owing to the presence of the king and court at Pontefract, which prevented his leaving home. In the previous year (1322) Thomas, Earl of Lancaster had been beheaded at Pontefract, and his body buried in the priory church "on the right hand of the high altar". Rumour declared that miracles had been wrought at the tomb. This attempt to regard the earl as a martyr aroused the anger of Edward II of England, who impounded the offerings. However, not long after, a chantry dedicated to St. Thomas was built on the site of the execution and, in 1343, license was given to the prior and Convent of Pontefract "to allow Masses and other Divine Services" to be celebrated there.

== Burials ==
- Robert de Lacy
- Maud de Perche
- Ilbert II de Lacy
- Richard Plantagenet, 3rd Duke of York
- Thurstan
- Thomas, 2nd Earl of Lancaster

== Dissolution ==
In the valor ecclesiasticus of 26 Henry VIII, the yearly revenue of the priory is entered as £472 16s. 10½d. gross, and £337 14s. 8½d. clear value. The last prior, James Thwayts, with seven brethren and one novice surrendered the monastery to the king, Henry VIII of England, 23 November 1540, the prior being assigned a pension of fifty pounds per annum.
