= Barony of Halton =

Noble title in Cheshire, England

- Creation date: 1071
- Created by: Hugh Lupus, 1st Earl of Chester
- First holder: Nigel of Cotentin
- Last holder: Henry Bolingbroke
- Status: Extinct (merged in the Crown)
- Extinction date: 30 September 1399
- Former seat: Halton Castle
- Arms

The Barony of Halton, in Cheshire, England, comprised a succession of 15 barons and hereditary Constables of Chester under the overlordship of the Earl of Chester. It was not an English feudal barony granted by the king (Note: This source (Sanders, I. J. (1960), p.138, note 4), English Baronies) does not list the barony of Halton as a feudal barony but refers to the "Lord of Halton, hereditary constable of the County Palatine" (i.e. of Chester).) but a separate class of barony within the County Palatine of Chester.

== Creation of the barony ==
After the Norman conquest, William the Conqueror created the three earldoms of Shrewsbury, Hereford and Chester to protect his border with Wales. In 1071, the Earl of Chester, Hugh Lupus, made his cousin, Nigel of Cotentin, the 1st Baron of Halton. Halton was a village in Cheshire which is now part of the town of Runcorn. At its centre is a rocky prominence on which was built Halton Castle, the seat of the barons of Halton.

== List of barons ==
=== Nigel of Cotentin ===
(c. 1071–1080)

Nigel was the hereditary Constable of Chester. In 1077 he fought against the Welsh at the Battle of Rhuddlan. It is almost certain that he built a motte-and-bailey castle on Halton Hill.

=== William fitz Nigel ===
(1080–1134)

William fitz Nigel, Nigel's son, was also marshal of the Earls' host, which was an important position in the Norman military hierarchy. In addition to his land in Halton, his estate included land in other parts of Cheshire and also in Normandy. He married the eldest daughter of Yorfid, on whose death without a male heir the Lancashire manors of Widnes, Appleton, Cronton and Rainhill came to his son-in-law, William. In 1115 William established a priory of the Augustinian Order of Canons Regular in Runcorn. He was buried at Chester.

=== William fitz William ===
(1134–1150)

William, son of William fitz Nigel, in 1134 he moved the priory from Runcorn to a site to the east of Halton. This became Norton Priory. William died childless in Normandy.

=== Eustace fitz John ===
(1150–1157)

Eustace fitz John succeeded to Halton as husband of the elder sister of William fitz William. He had inherited the barony of Knaresborough and by an earlier marriage had also gained the baronies of Malton and Alnwick. He was killed fighting the Welsh.

=== Richard fitz Eustace ===
(1157–1171)

Richard, son of Eustace fitz John, married the eventual heiress to the de Lacy family of Pontefract, whose inheritance was eventually acquired by their grandson Roger.

=== John fitz Richard ===
(1171–1190)

John, son of Richard fitz Eustace, was a governor in Ireland for Henry II. Being a patron of science, he maintained an astronomer at Halton Castle. He founded a Cistercian monastery at Stanlow. In 1190 he granted the second known charter for a ferry at Runcorn Gap. He served with Richard I in the Third Crusade and died at the siege of Acre.

=== Roger de Lacy ===
(1190–1211)

Born as Roger fitz John, the son of John fitz Richard, he adopted the surname of de Lacy. He was a renowned soldier and was nicknamed "Hell" Lacy for his military daring. In 1192 he was also serving with Richard I in the Third Crusade. Later he served King John in the unsuccessful attempt to thwart the French conquest of Normandy following which he was made High Sheriff of Lancashire. He was buried in the abbey founded by his father at Stanlow.

=== John de Lacy ===
(1211–1240)

John de Lacy, son of Roger, opposed King John and was one of the barons entrusted with the duty of ensuring that the king kept the agreements made in Magna Carta. By marriage he gained more titles, including that of the Earldom of Lincoln. He also gained the manor and the castle of Bolingbroke. He was also buried at Stanlow.

=== Edmund de Lacy ===
(1240–1258)

Of Edmund de Lacy, son of John, little is known except that he was also buried at Stanlow.

=== Henry de Lacy ===
(1258–1311)

Henry de Lacy, son of Edmund, was educated at court and became Chief Councillor to Edward I. While the king was engaged on military conflicts with the Scots, Henry was appointed Protector of the Realm. He transferred the monastery from Stanlow to Whalley. He died at his London home, Lincoln's Inn and was buried in the old St Paul's Cathedral.

=== Thomas, Earl of Lancaster ===
(1311–1322)

Thomas gained the barony of Halton though his marriage to Alice, Henry's daughter. He took up arms against Edward II in 1322. However this rebellion was unsuccessful. He was defeated at the Battle of Boroughbridge and then imprisoned in his own castle at Pontefract. A few days later he was beheaded outside the city and his titles forfeited to the Crown. Later a cult of martyrdom developed around him.

=== Henry, 3rd Earl of Lancaster or Sir William Glinton ===
(1322–1351)

Thomas was posthumously pardoned by Edward III and in 1327, Thomas's titles were restored to his brother, Henry, 3rd Earl of Lancaster.

It has also been suggested that the title succeeded to Sir William Glinton. He was a distinguished knight who may have held the honour as a non-hereditary arrangement or he may have held it during the life of Alice, widow of Thomas of Lancaster.

=== Henry Grosmont ===
(1351–1361)

Henry of Grosmont, 1st Duke of Lancaster, nephew of the 2nd Earl and son of the 3rd, next succeeded to the barony of Halton. He was appointed as the 1st Duke of Lancaster, one of the first Knights of the Order of the Garter. He served the king in France and died of the plague. He was buried at Leicester.

=== John of Gaunt ===
(1361–1399)

John of Gaunt gained the barony by his marriage to Blanche, daughter and heiress of the 13th baron. He was appointed regent during the infancy of Richard II. He was also buried in St Paul's Cathedral.

=== Henry Bolingbroke ===
(1399–1413)

Henry Bolingbroke was the eldest son of John of Gaunt. He was banished from England by Richard II and at the time of his father's death he was in exile in France. When he returned to England to claim his estates the people rallied round him. Richard II was deposed and Henry was crowned King Henry IV. Henry procured an Act of Parliament to ordain that the Duchy of Lancaster would remain in the personal possession of the reigning monarch and the barony of Halton is now vested in that dukedom.

== Sources ==
- McNeil, Robina, ed. (1987), Halton Castle: A Visual Treasure, Liverpool: North West Archaeological Trust, ISBN 978-0-9510204-1-8
- Nickson, Charles (1887). History of Runcorn; with an account of the ancient village of Weston ... Drawings by H. Fitton. [Reprinted from the "Runcorn Guardian."]. London and Warrington: Mackie & Co. OCLC 5389146.
- Sanders, Ivor John (1960). English Baronies: A Study of Their Origin and Descent, 1086-1327. Clarendon Press.
- Starkey, H. F. (1990), Old Runcorn, Halton: Halton Borough Council
- Whimperley, Arthur (1981), Halton Castle: An Introduction & Visitors' Handbook, Widnes: Arthur Whimperley
- Whimperley, Arthur (1986), The Barons of Halton, Widnes: MailBook Publishing
