= Halton Castle =

Castle ruins in Cheshire, England

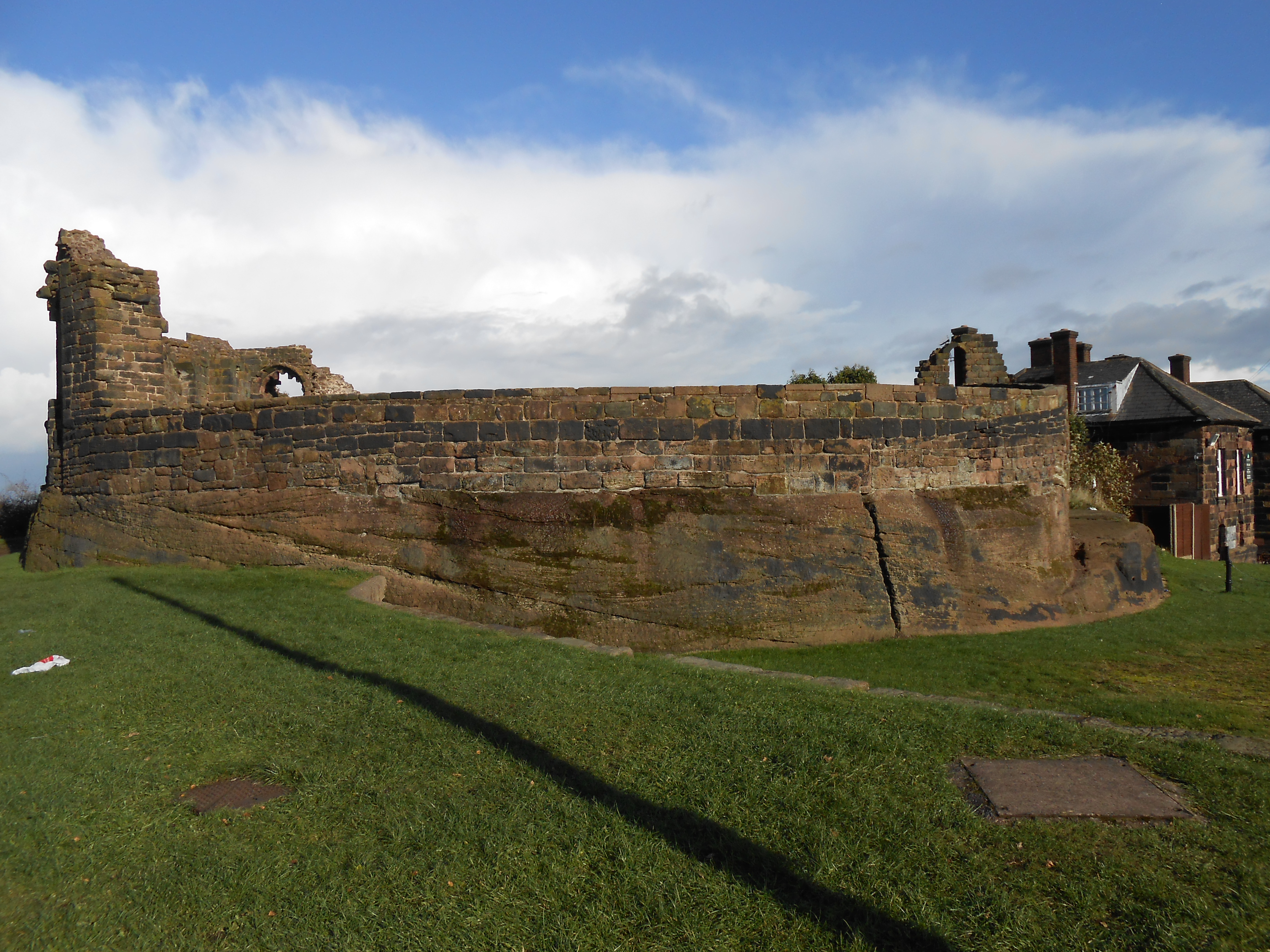
- Part of Halton Castle ruins in 2006

- Location in Cheshire
- 53.3331°N 2.6957°W
- Location: Halton, Runcorn, Cheshire, England
- OS grid reference: SJ 537,821

History
- Built: 11th century
- Built for: Hugh d'Avranches, Earl of Chester

Site notes
- Architectural style: Castle
- Governing body: Halton Borough Council
- Owner: Duchy of Lancaster
- Website: nortonpriory.org/about/halton-castle/

Listed Building – Grade I
- Designated: 23 April 1970
- Reference no.: 1130460

Scheduled monument
- Designated: 26 November 1963
- Reference no.: 1015606

Halton Castle is a castle in the village of Halton, part of the town of Runcorn, Cheshire, England. The castle is on the top of Halton Hill, a sandstone prominence overlooking the village. The original building, a motte-and-bailey castle began in 1071, was replaced with the current sandstone castle in the 13th century. Building alterations continued until at least 1609, when the structure is recorded as in disrepair. The castle is recorded in the National Heritage List for England as a designated Grade I listed building, and a scheduled monument.

It was the seat of the Barons of Halton from the 11th century until the 14th century, then passed to the Duchy of Lancaster. It was besieged twice in the Civil War after which its structure deteriorated. In the 18th century a new courthouse was built on the site of the previous gatehouse. The castle lies in ruins apart from the courthouse which has been converted into a public house.

== History ==
=== Early history ===
There is evidence that Halton Hill was a settlement in prehistoric times. Construction of the castle began in 1071 after Hugh d'Avranches, Earl of Chester, gave the land to Nigel of Cotentin, who built a wooden motte-and-bailey castle. This was replaced by a sandstone castle in the 13th century, which still stands. In 1207 King John visited and donated £5 towards the upkeep of its chapel. Edward II visited the castle for three days in November 1323, during which time he also visited Norton Priory. When the 15th baron of Halton, Henry Bolingbroke, became King Henry IV, the castle became the property of the Duchy of Lancaster in the 15th Century.

A new gate tower was built between 1450 and 1457. During the Tudor period it was primarily used as a prison, an administrative centre, and a court of law. In 1580–81 the castle was designated as a prison for Catholic recusants. According to a survey of the Royal Palaces in 1609, the castle had fallen into disrepair by then.

=== Civil War ===
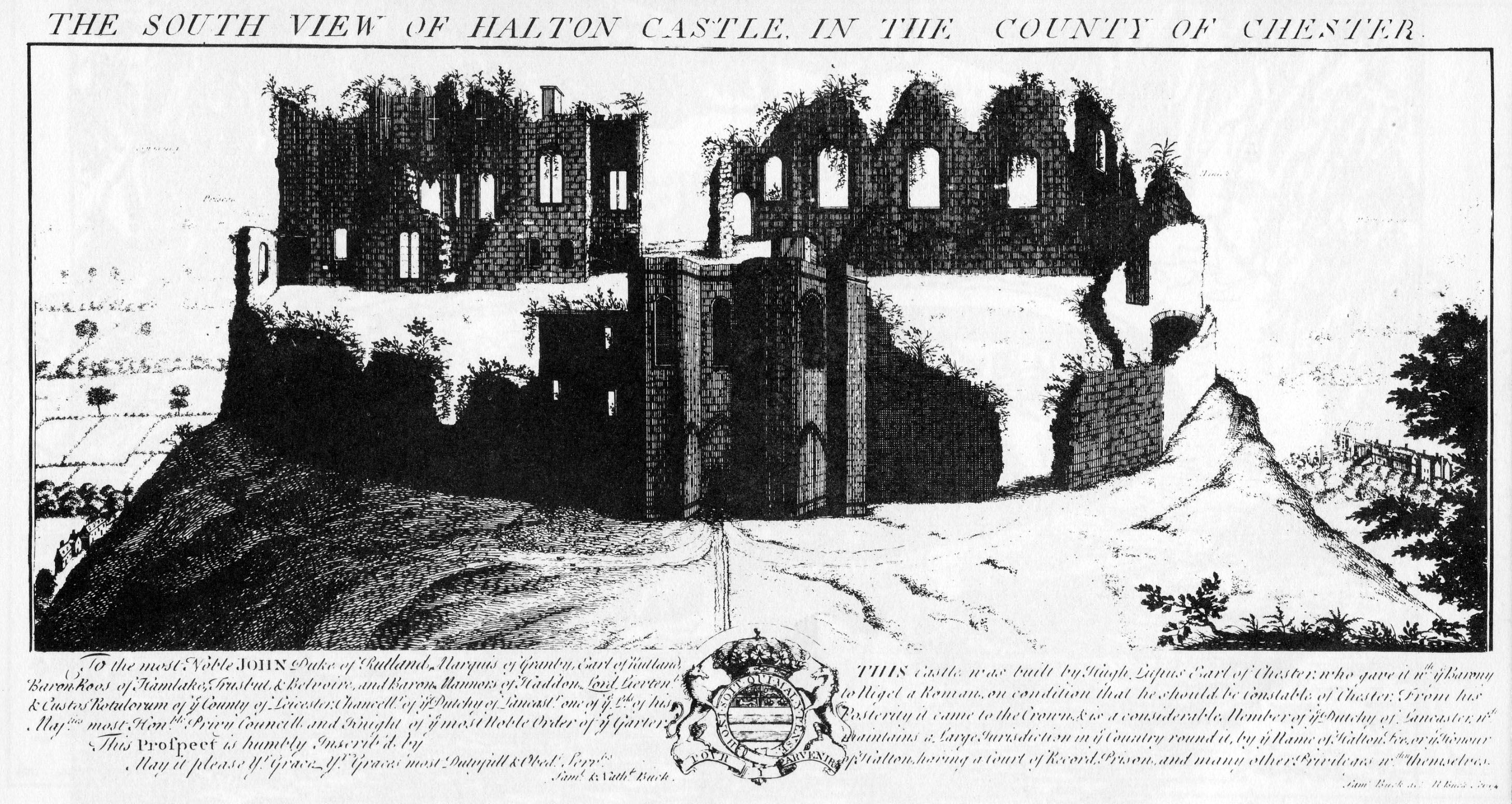
Halton Castle in 1727. Engraving by the Buck brothers

At the outbreak of the Civil War the castle was garrisoned by the Royalists under the command of Captain Walter Primrose who had been appointed by Earl Rivers. It was besieged by Roundhead Parliamentary forces under Sir William Brereton in 1643 and, after several weeks' fighting, the Royalists surrendered. They regained control under Colonel Fenwick after the Parliamentarians abandoned the castle to focus on Royalist forces led by Prince Rupert. There was a second siege in 1644 but, as the fortunes of the Royalists declined elsewhere, they withdrew from Halton and the Parliamentarians under Sir William Brereton re-occupied the castle. In 1646 a "Council of War" was held in Warrington where it was decided that the defences of the castles at Halton and Beeston should be dismantled. Halton Castle served no military function after this time. By 1650 the castle was said to be "very ruinous".

=== Later history ===
The condition of the building continued to deteriorate although the gatehouse remained in use as a court. In 1728 George Cholmondeley, 2nd Earl of Cholmondeley, leased the site from the Crown. In 1737 a courthouse was built on the site of the medieval gatehouse. Henry Sephton, a Liverpool architect and builder, and John Orme, a joiner from Prescot, were appointed to carry out the work. The first floor was the courtroom and prisoners were held in the basement. By 1792 the courthouse had fallen into disrepair and money was found to repair it, although the source of that money is unclear. The court continued to function there until 1908.

In around 1800, three folly walls had been added to the existing ruined walls on the east side of the castle to make it look more impressive from Norton Priory, the home of Sir Richard Brooke. One of these walls was demolished in around 1906. During the Victorian era a sunken garden and two bowling greens were constructed within the castle enclosure. In 1977 the castle was leased to Halton Borough Council. In 1986–87 the site of the castle was excavated.

== Present state ==
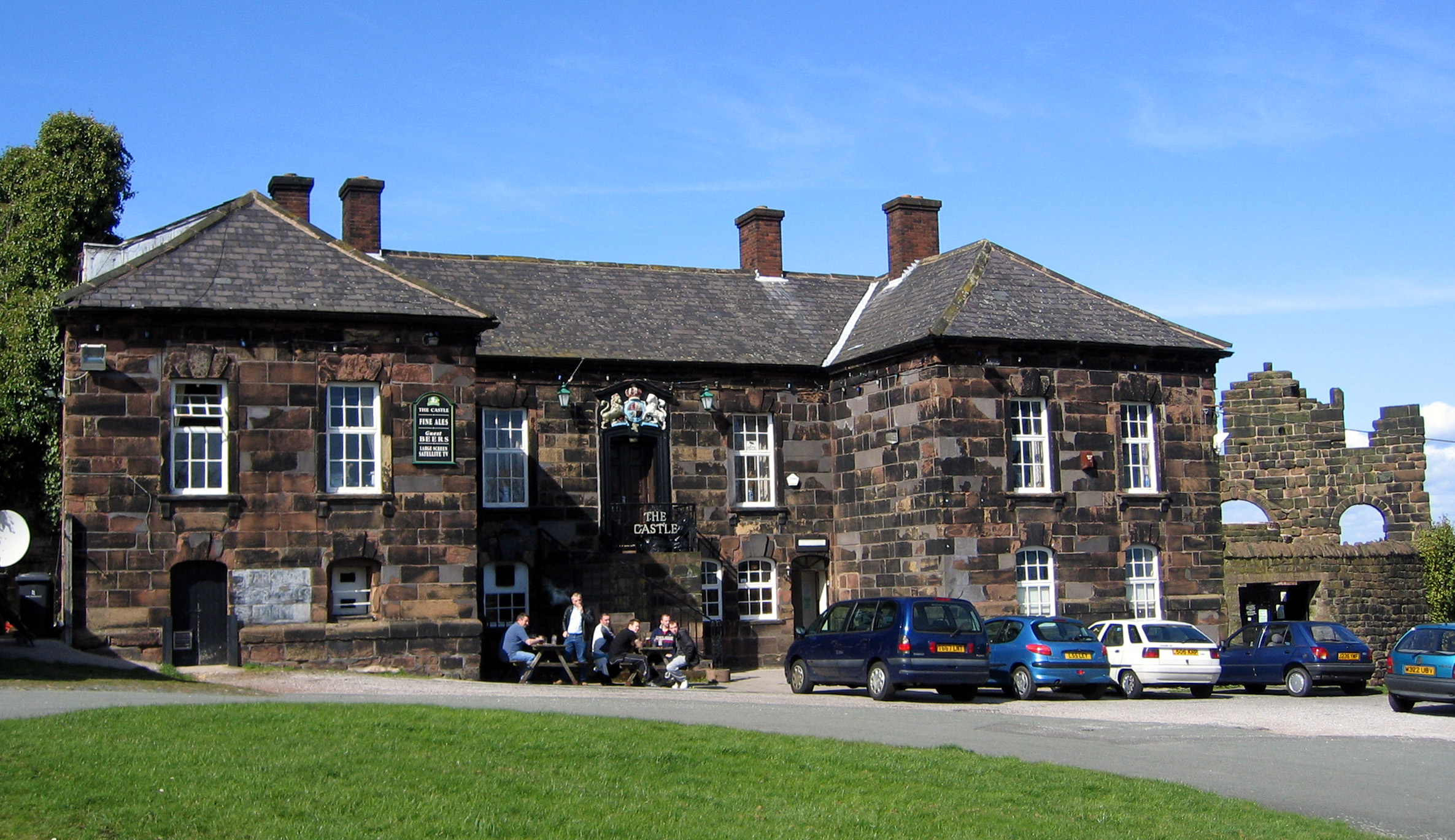
Former courthouse of the castle, now The Castle public house

The castle continues to be owned by the Duchy of Lancaster. It is leased from the Duchy by Halton Borough Council with support from The Norton Priory Museum Trust. The castle is a Grade I listed building. Its walls are in a ruinous state, but the circumference is intact and it is possible to walk completely around the exterior. From its prominent position there are extensive views in all directions, including Lancashire, Cheshire, the Pennines, the hills of the Peak District and the mountains of North Wales. The courthouse is now a public house, The Castle, Halton. Its first floor is used as a function room and the basement contains the cellars of the public house. It is designated as a Grade II* listed building.

== See also ==
- List of Scheduled Monuments in Cheshire (1066–1539)
- Listed buildings in Runcorn (urban area)
- Grade I listed buildings in Cheshire
- Castles in Great Britain and Ireland
- List of castles in Cheshire
