= Baron Vesci =

Extinct barony in the Peerage of England

Baron Vesci was a title in the Peerage of England and Peerage of the United Kingdom. It existed as a feudal barony by tenure, before being created by Writ of summons to Parliament of John de Vesci in 1264 until his death in 1289. It was created a second time by writ of William de Vescy in 1295 until his death in 1297. It was created a third time in 1313 by writ of William de Vesci until his death in 1314. The title was created a fourth time by writ for Sir Henry Bromflete, created Baron Vessy in 1449, but became extinct upon his death in 1469. The title was created a fifth time for John Vesey, 4th Viscount de Vesci in 1884 until his death in 1903 when the title became extinct.

== Feudal barony by tenure ==
- Ivo de Vesci, 1st Baron Vesci.
- Eustace Fitz-John, 2nd Baron Vesci, (de jure uxoris) in right of his wife Beatrix de Vesci, daughter of Ivo de Vesci, died in 1157.
- William Fitz-Eustace, 3rd Baron Vesci, son and heir of Beatrix de Vesci, assumed his mother's name, died in 1184.
- Eustace de Vesci, 3rd Baron Vesci, son and heir, was one of the 25 barons appointed to enforce Magna Carta, died about 1216.
- William de Vesci, 4th Baron Vesci, son and heir, died in the year 1253.

== Baron Vesci (1264) ==
- John de Vesci, 5th Baron Vesci, son and heir of William de Vesci, summoned to parliament on 24 December 1264, died 1289, without issue.

== Baron Vescy (1295) ==
- William de Vescy, 6th Baron Vescy, brother and heir of John de Vesci, was one of the competitors for the crown of Scotland, died in 1297, with out lawful issue. Barony Extinct.

== Baron Vescy (1313) ==
- William de Vescy, 7th Baron Vescy, natural son of William de Vescy, the last baron, summoned to parliament om 8 January 1313, died at the Battle of Bannockburn in 1314, without issue. Barony Extinct.

== Baron Vessy (1449) ==
- Sir Henry Bromflete, created Baron Vessy in 1449 but extinct in 1469 upon his death.

== Baron de Vesci (1884) ==
- John Vesey, 4th Viscount de Vesci created in 1884 until his death in 1903 when the title became extinct.
