= Ratcheugh Observatory =

Listed building in Longhoughton, Northumberland, England

Coordinates: 55°25′20″N 1°38′48″W

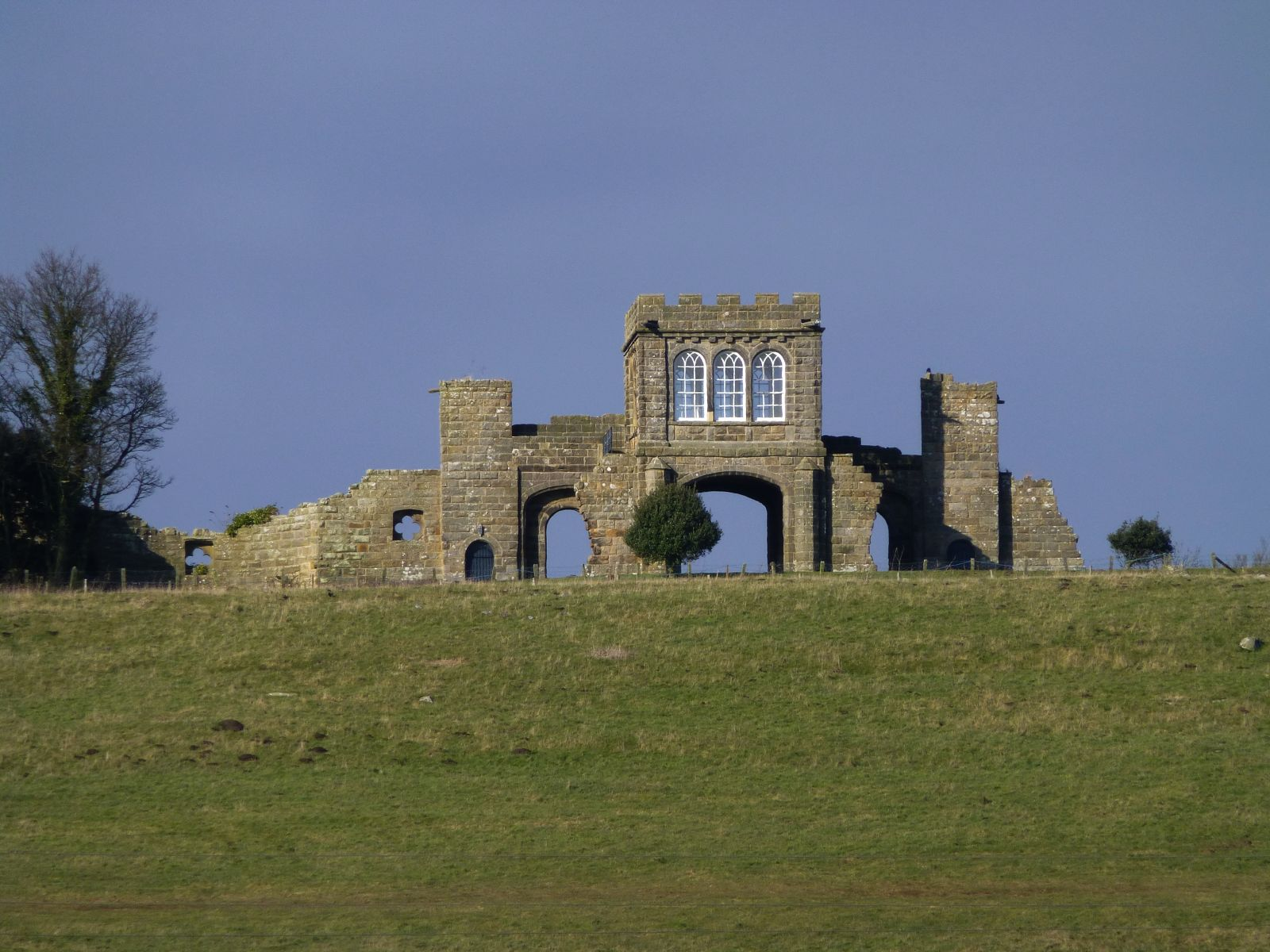
Ratcheugh Observatory from the east

Ratcheugh Observatory is a late 18th-century folly on a prominent crag (Note: 'heugh', pronounced 'huff', is a Northumberland word meaning "a precipitous hill, a cliff, a cleft or dell with steep sides, but without a stream in it".) between Alnwick and Longhoughton in north Northumberland, England. Commissioned by Hugh Percy, 1st Duke of Northumberland, the castellated Observatory incorporates a viewing tower with prospects of Alnwick and its castle, and of the North Sea coast at Boulmer.

== Location ==
Ratcheugh Observatory is located on Ratcheugh Crag, a local 120-metre (390 ft) whinstone high-point above a foreground of fields at 85-metre (279 ft) or lower elevations, situated 2.2 miles (3.5 km) east-north-east of Alnwick and 1.2 miles (1.9 km) west-south-west of Longhoughton; 2.5 miles (4.0 km) inland from the coast at Boulmer, in north Northumberland.

== Observatory ==
The Observatory, a Grade I listed building, is a screen-wall built at the crag edge, incorporated into which are a number of turrets or towers; and having towards its northern extent a square-plan viewing tower built on open hollow-chamfered arches. The tower has a single enclosed room, each wall having three large round-arched windows affording commanding views to the north-east, north-west, south-east and south-west. The structure is described by Historic England as a gazebo and eye-catcher in the Castellated Gothick style, and is constructed in rough-faced stone with ashlar dressings.

The Observatory was designed by (or follows a design outline of) Robert Adam, and dates from 1754–1770. It provides very fine views of Alnwick Castle, Hulne Park, Hulne Priory and other local possessions of the Duke; a 360° panorama of the local area, farmland used for fox hunting and point-to-point horse racing; and distant views of Dunstanburgh and Warkworth Castles and the Farne Islands.

It is one of a number of follies built on the skylines around Alnwick; others include the 1781 Brizlee Tower, another creation of the Duke; Jenny's Lantern on the Bolton estate, and Crawley Tower on the Shawdon estate, all dating from the late 18th century.

The Observatory incorporates a small cottage, an addition from around 1850.
