= Alnwick Abbey =

Monastery in Northumberland, England

Coordinates: 55.41985°N 1.71914°W

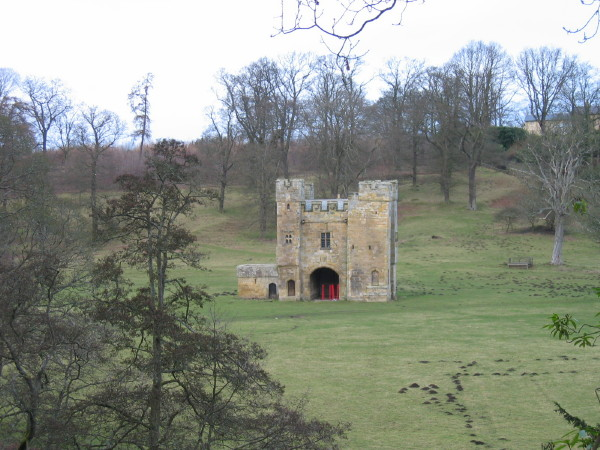
- Alnwick Abbey gatehouse
- Interactive map of Alnwick Abbey

Monastery information
- Order: Premonstratensian
- Established: 1147
- Disestablished: 1539
- Mother house: St Mary and St. Martial at Newsham

People
- Founder: Eustace fitz John

Site
- Location: Alnwick

Alnwick Abbey was founded as a Premonstratensian monastery in 1147 by Eustace fitz John near Alnwick, England, as a daughter house of Newhouse Abbey in Lincolnshire. It was dissolved in 1535, refounded in 1536 and finally suppressed in 1539. The Alnwick Abbey site is located just within Hulne Park, on the bank of the River Aln. The only visible remnant is the impressive 14th-century gatehouse, a Grade I listed building.

== Founding ==
Eustace fitz John became lord of the barony of Alnwick by his marriage with Beatrix, the daughter of Ivo de Vesci. He endowed it amply. The charter of foundation, included in a confirmatory charter of Henry Percy, Earl of Northumberland, is addressed to William of St. Barbara, Bishop of Durham. Among the souls for whose benefit it was erected, is mentioned that of Ivo de Vesci. From Dugdale's authority, it is said that the first of that order came to settle at Alnwick in the year 1147. The order first came over in 1143, and settled at Newhouse, in Lincolnshire, in their monastery built by Peter of Goxhill, dedicated to St. Mary and St. Martial. Although following a rule based on the "Rule of St. Augustine", the Premonstratensian order incorporated Cistercian values of austerity and seclusion and founded all its monasteries in rural locations.

Dependencies included the hospital at Alnwick, and Guyzance Priory, which was annexed to Alnwick by Eustace fitz John.

== Fourteenth-century banquet ==
In the chronicle of this house, preserved in the library of King's College, Cambridge, there is an account of a banquet given by Walter de Hepescotes, the abbot, in 1376, on the day of the Assumption of the Blessed Virgin Mary, to Henry the 4th Lord of Alnwick, with the thirteen following knights: William de Acon, Richard Tempest, Walter Blount, Allan de Heton, John Conyers, John Heron, John Littleburum, Thomas de Ilderton, Thomas de Boynton, Ingram de Umfravil, John de Dichaunt, John de Swynton, Radulphus de Viners; and many others of the chief gentry of the country, amounting to 120, all entertained in the refectory; in addition to eighty-six at a second repast. The cloisters too were filled with commoners of all ages, to the number of 1,020, who were likewise there feasted.

== Burials ==
It appears from the same authority that a number of the Percys were interred here; particularly Henry, the second Lord of Alnwick, who died c. 1351; Henry the third Lord, who bestowed on the monks 100ℓ (i.e. £100) at his death in 1368; also Mary his wife, daughter of Henry, 3rd Earl of Lancaster.

Henry, the fourth Lord of Alnwick, in 1372, was admitted in the month of February to the Brotherhood of this chapter, together with many other knights and esquires; as also, in the succeeding year, Henry his eldest son, with his two brothers, Sir Thomas and Sir Ralph.

== Other burials ==
- John de Vesci
- Eustace de Vesci
- William de Vesci and his wife Burga de Stuteville (daughter of Robert III de Stuteville)
- Henry Percy, 1st Earl of Northumberland
- Mary of Lancaster

== Famine and pestilence ==
During the abbacy of Walter de Hepescotes, this house was afflicted with a great scarcity, together with a pestilence, whereby all the cattle belonging to the monastery were destroyed.

== Summons to parliament ==
The abbot of this house was summoned to the parliaments of the 23rd, 24th, 28th, 32nd, and 34th years of King Edward I (1272–1307); also to that held at Carlisle, 35th of the same reign; and to the parliament of the 19th year of King Edward II (1307–1327).

== Dissolution and subsequent possession ==
At the dissolution of the monasteries in 1539, the revenues of this house were valued at £1,89l. 15s. by Dugdale, and £1,94l. 7s. by Speed, there being then thirteen canons. King Edward VI in the fourth year of his reign, granted the site to Ralph Sadler and Laurence Winnington. It came afterwards to the possession of the Brandling of Newcastle family and the Doubledays.

Francis Brandling welcomed King James VI and I at Alnwick Abbey on 7 May 1617 for two nights. The king had come from Bothal Castle and was on his way to Scotland.

== Gatehouse and tower ==
There are no remains of the Abbey except for the gatehouse and tower, which by the architecture and arms sculptured upon the building, show it is of much more modern date than the foundation of the house. This tower is not square, but oblong, having an exploratory turret on each corner. The north side is ornamented with a niche, canopied, capable of receiving a statue five feet high: most probably it contained the effigies of the dedicatory Virgin. Beneath is a figure of an angel in relief, with expanded wings. Over this entrance are shields of arms, a cross, supposed to be the arms of the Vesci family, and a Cross moline. On the south side, in a niche, is the figure of one of the Religious, of the order of White Friars of Premonstratenses, in his proper habilament, in fairly good preservation. This front is ornamented with shields of arms, the arms of Brabant adopted by the Percys, with the arms of Lucys quarterly, the principal; and also the arms of Vesci. A gate opens to the east, on each side of which are the figures of cherubs supporting armorial shields: on this front is also a canopy and niche for a statue. Here are the arms of Brabant and the arms of the Lucys on separate shields. At this entrance, as also on the north side, were machicolations; and in the centre of the arching of the gateway is a square aperture, from which the possessors could annoy assailants. The masonry of this tower is excellent; the gates of lattice braced with iron still remain. Above the gate going into the court of the house is an escutcheon of white marble, much injured by the weather, but retaining some marks of the sculptor, to distinguish that it once contained the crest of the Doubledays, an arm in armour suspending a mullet. The antiquity of this piece has been much doubted, but the materials determine that point clearly.

The gatehouse is Grade I listed as a Scheduled Ancient Monument.

== Abbots ==
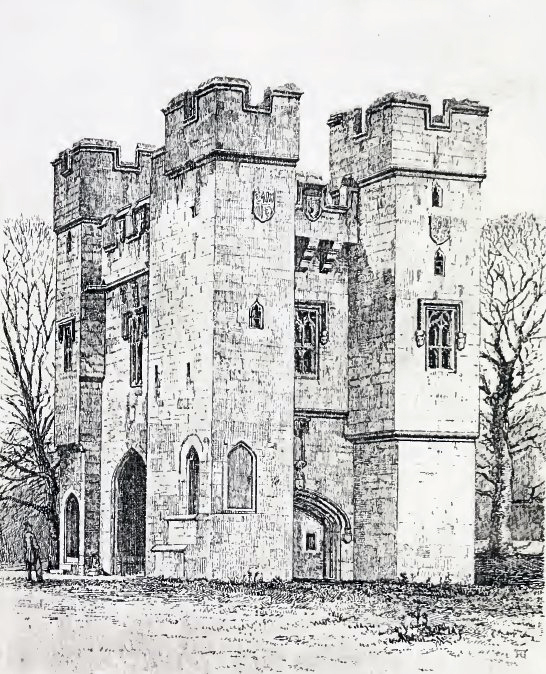
1869 line drawing of the Alnwick Abbey gatehouse

- Baldwin 1148-52
- Patrick 1152-67
- Richardus 1167 - post 1180
- Gilbertus 1197, + 1208
- Adam ? deposed 1208
- Galfridus, 1209
- Benedictus 1212
- Bartholomaeus 1219, 1222?
- Petrus 1224-39
- Walter ante 1245, 1246
- Reginaldus 1249-50
- Richardus? 1250
- Wilhelmus de Alnmouth 1269-75
- Thomas de Kirkeby 1283-84
- Alanus de Staunford 1289-1304
- Thomas 1310
- Joannes de Otteley 1224-39
- Joannes de Alnwick 1340-50
- Henricus de Bamburgh 1353-54
- Walter res. 1362
- Robertus de Rothbury 1362, 1364
- Walter de Heppescotes 1376, 1390
- Christophorus 1400
- Wilhelmus Kok 1404-07
- Thomas 1420
- Joannes 1437
- Wilhelmus 1457
- Thomas Alnwick 1475-90
- Patricius Calle elect. 1491- 1497
- Robert Bowman, 1497, 1502
- Georgius 1506
- Matthias Mackerell 1519-22
- Robertus 1525-30
- Roger Acton 1531
- William Harrison, 1532–40

== See also ==
- List of monastic houses in Northumberland
- List of monastic houses in England

== Sources ==
- Grundy, John (2022). History of Northumberland. Newcastle upon Tyne: Tyne Bridge Publishing. ISBN 9781838280970.
- Anthony New. A Guide to the Abbeys of England and Wales. Constable. pp. 39–40.
