= William de Vesci (disambiguation) =

William de Vesci was the son of Eustace fitz John, who died in 1184.

William de Vesci or William de Vescy may refer to:

- William de Vesci (d.1253), son of Eustace de Vesci
- William de Vesci (d.1297), son of William de Vesci
- William de Vescy of Kildare, illegitimate son of William de Vesci (d.1297), killed during the Battle of Bannockburn
