= Brizlee Tower =

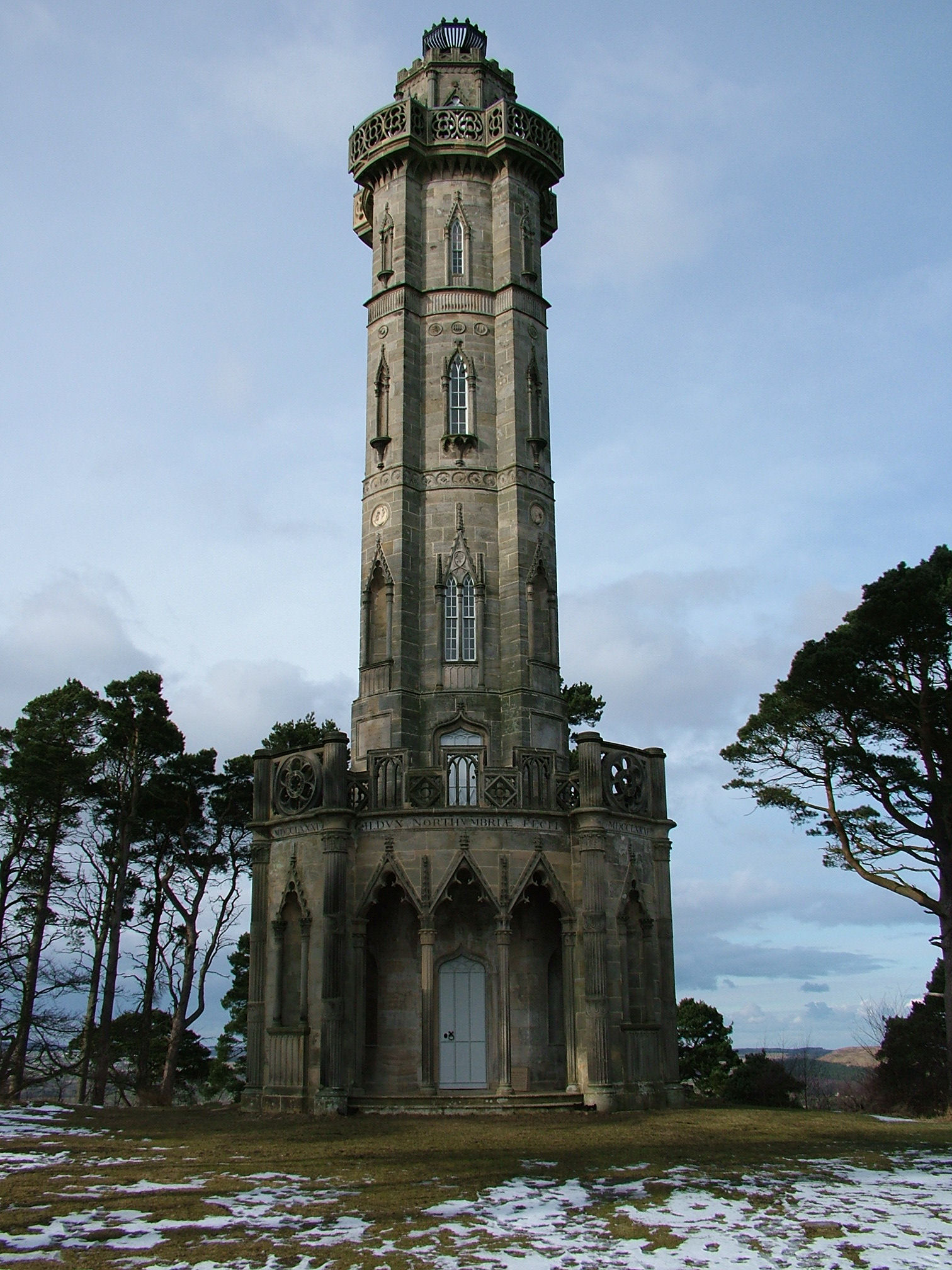
- Brizlee Tower in 2006, before its renovation
- Interactive map of the Brizlee Tower area

General information
- Status: Grade I listed
- Type: Folly tower
- Architectural style: Gothic Revival
- Location: Hulne Park, Alnwick, Northumberland, England
- Coordinates: 55.42636°N 1.75186°W
- Completed: 1781
- Client: Hugh Percy, 1st Duke of Northumberland

Height
- Height: 26 metres (85 ft)

Technical details
- Floor count: 6

Design and construction
- Architect: Robert Adam or John Adam
- Designations: Grade I listed

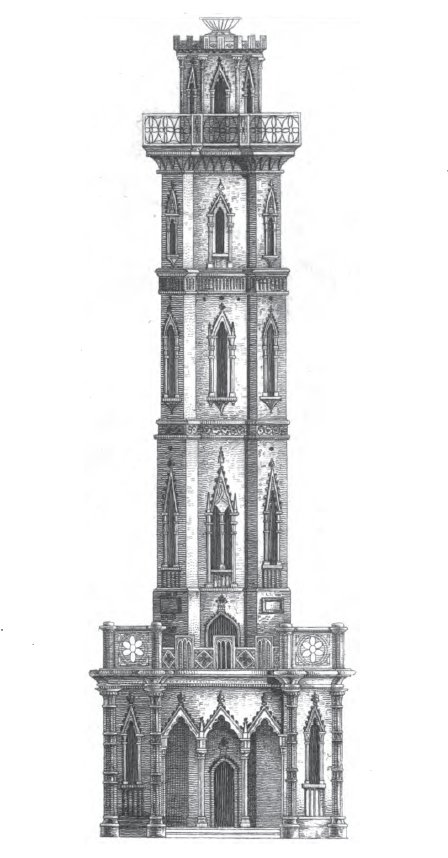
Illustration of Brizlee Tower from A Descriptive and Historical View of Alnwick, 1822

Brizlee Tower (sometimes Brislee Tower) is a Grade I listed folly set atop a hill in Hulne Park, the walled home park of the Duke of Northumberland in Alnwick, Northumberland. The tower was erected in 1781 for Hugh Percy, 1st Duke of Northumberland, and commands extensive views over North Northumberland and the Borders.

== The tower ==
Brizlee Tower is a 26-metre-high elaborately ornamental tower in dressed stone set at the edge of the northern escarpment of Brizlee Hill, overlooking Hulne Park, the "home park" of Alnwick Castle. The hill's relative elevation (about 177 metres above sea-level, in comparison with the valley floor's 44 metres) makes the tower's site a natural vantage point with all-encompassing views to the west, north and east – including the vale of Whittingham, through which the River Aln flows; the sites of numerous country seats past and present, such as at Eslington, Bolton, Callaly, Shawdon, Broomepark, and Lemington; Hulne Priory within the park walls; The Cheviot, 20 miles distant and the Teviotdale hills and Flodden a further 20 miles away; the Northumberland coast including the Farne Islands and Coquet Island, and the castles at Bamburgh, Dunstanburgh and Warkworth. Southerly views are blocked by Alnwick Moor, which rises higher than the tower.

The tower was commissioned in about 1777 to commemorate Lady Elizabeth Seymour, who died in 1776, by her husband Hugh Percy, 1st Duke of Northumberland, after the third creation of that title by virtue of the marriage. It was completed in about 1781. It functions as a viewing platform for the Duke's park, landscaped during the Hugh Percy period by "Capability" Brown. J. Mordaunt Crook, in his Alfred Bossom lecture, Northumbrian Gothick, notes that Thomas Percy (later Bishop of Dromore) related, in 1765, plans for a tower in the position Brizlee Tower eventually took, in a letter describing his visit to Alnwick.

The tower has six stages, the lowest of which has an encircling verandah, and the topmost surrounded by a projecting viewing platform or balcony, and surmounted by a cast-iron fire basket. Brizlee Hill, prior to the tower's erection, is reputed to have been the site of a fire-beacon used to warn of the approach of enemies. The tower is circular in plan, and has four slight rectangular projecting buttresses. An interior newel staircase is lit through windows.

The tower is in an elaborate Gothic revival style, the design being variously attributed to Robert Adam; or to his brother John (who were also employed on other works for the Duke including a remodelling of the interiors of Northumberland House and Syon House in London); to the Duke himself; and even to the Duke's French pastrycook.

Mordaunt Crook describes the tower as being stylistically unrestrained - "its components ... extraordinarily elastic: classical acanthus capitals; pierced arcaded battlements; Gothic finials and crockets; a touch of the Saracenic; perhaps even a hint of Rosslyn Chapel - all adding up to 75 feet of Rococo fantasy rearing high above the Romantic landscape of Alnwick Park" - and quotes a commentator upset by the "defiance of all rule whatever" ... "This building is a sad monument of vanity".

Above the balcony, under the Duke's crest, an inscription notes: Circumspice! Ego omnia ista sum dimensus; Mei sunt ordines, Mea descriptio Multae Etiam istarum arborum Mea manu sunt satae, which is translated: "Look around! I have measured out all these things; they are my orders, it is my planning; many of these trees have even been planted by my hand".

The tower was given a Grade 1 listing in December 1969, but by the end of the 20th century had been placed on the Buildings at Risk Register owing to extensive water damage and corroded ironwork, and was closed to the public. It was extensively renovated in the first decade of the 21st century and, whilst still not generally open to the public, access has occasionally been permitted for charitable purposes.

== See also ==
- Camphill Column, Alnwick
- Ratcheugh Observatory
- Tenantry Column
