= Richard de Vaux of Fallowfield =

14th-century English landowner and outlaw

Richard Vaux of Fallowfield was a 14th-century English landowner in Hexhamshire, local juror, outlaw and border raider.

== Life ==
Richard is known to have had two brothers Adam and William. He served as a juror in Hexhamshire.

Together with his brothers, Richard was implicated and involved in the high-profile murder of John de Coupland on 20 December 1363. Coupland was attacked and killed while crossing Bolton Moor. The attack was planned by Richard's cousin John de Clifford.

Vaux, his brothers and the other attackers fled into Scotland to avoid arrest. Richard later joined the private military retinue of William Swinburne.

His estates were inherited by his kinswoman Elizabeth de Vaux who was married to John de Errington.
