= Jenny's Lantern =

Hill near Alnwick, Northumberland, England

Coordinates: 55°25′54″N 1°48′45″W

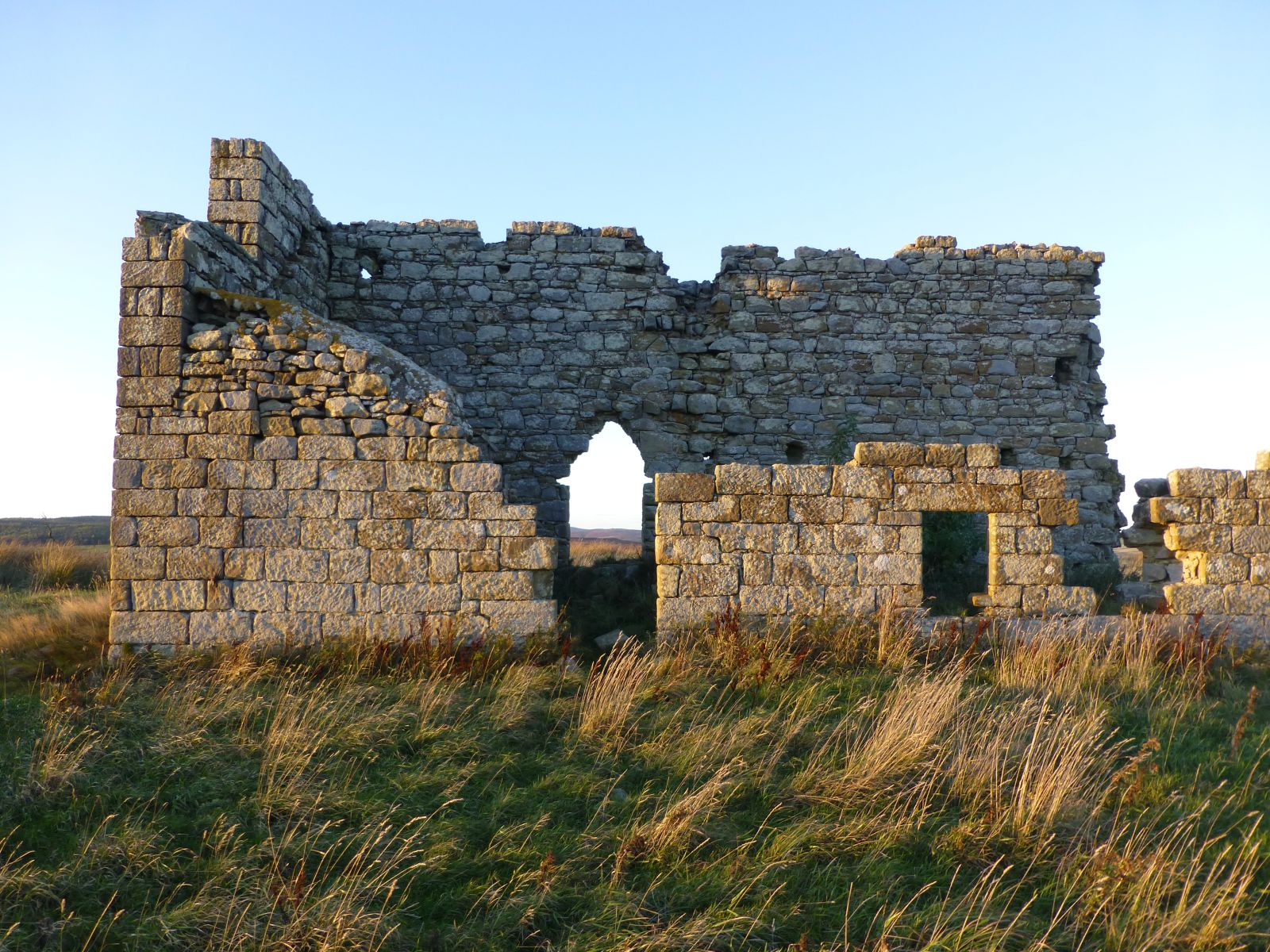
The Jenny's Lantern folly

Jenny's Lantern is an area of moorland in north Northumberland, England, taking its name from an 18th-century 'eye-catcher' folly sited towards the top of a small promontory hill above the River Aln. Situated on the southern slope of the Jenny's Lantern area is an Iron Age hillfort, overbuilt by and adjoined to a larger and very well preserved Romano-British stone-built settlement and field system. It partially collapsed during a storm in November 2021.

== Location and naming ==
The Jenny's Lantern area is a small south-facing hill or promontory rising to 144 metres (472 ft) above the Aln valley's 50 metres (160 ft) floor, 1.32 miles (2.12 km) north-east of Bolton and 2.7 miles (4.3 km) south of Eglingham, villages in north Northumberland. Confusingly, the site is 0.66 miles (1.06 km) north-east of a completely distinct Jenny's Lantern Hill. The site is immediately south of the boundary of Bewick and Beanley Moors SSSI.

Jenny's Lantern, or Jenny of the Lantern, is the reputed Northumbrian name for Will-o'-the-wisp, a form of atmospheric ghost lights associated with leading travellers to dangerous places. A legend ascribed to this Jenny's Lantern tells of a shepherd who, one night, is drowned in a bog whilst following a lantern lit by his wife Jenny to guide his return from the inn at Eglingham.

== Folly ==
An 18th-century folly, presumably built by the Bolton estate, is sited towards the top of the Jenny's Lantern area; it takes the form of a ruined shepherd's cottage, rectangular in plan with door and windows on the south wall, a complete westerly wall, but stepped and ruined towards the east wall. Historic England describe it as an eye-catcher and speculate that the design is based on the nearby Crawley Tower, situated 3.2 miles (5.1 km) to the west, a 14th-century tower house modified in the 18th century as an eye-catcher for the Shawdon estate. The local penchant for follies extended to the dominant landowner, Hugh Percy, 1st Duke of Northumberland who commissioned the Ratcheugh Observatory before 1770, and whose 1781 Brizlee Tower sits roughly opposite, across the Aln, from Jenny's Lantern.

During a severe storm on the night of 27 November 2021, the folly partially collapsed.

== Hillfort ==
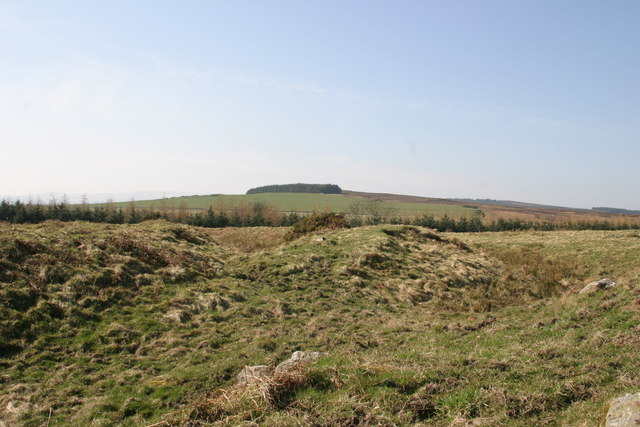
Detail of outer rampart of Iron Age hillfort at Jenny's Lantern

Jenny's Lantern hillfort is an Iron Age defended settlement, undated, but falling within a style dating from circa 700BCE to 100CE. The fort is situated on the 135 metres (443 ft) elevation contour and is of multivallate form, delineated by twin 5 metres (16 ft) wide ramparts, the inner being up to 0.6 metres (2 ft 0 in) high and the outer up to 1.5 metres (4 ft 11 in) high, separated by a 6 metres (20 ft) ditch, and forming an oval of 100 metres (330 ft) by 68 metres (223 ft) with the long axis orientated NE-SW, and entrance-ways at the north-east and south-west extents.

== Romano-British settlement ==
The Jenny's Lantern site is circa 2.4 miles (3.9 km) east of the Devil's Causeway, a major north-south Roman road; and 2.6 miles (4.2 km) north-north-east of the Roman fort at Learchild. The Jenny's Lantern hillfort, and the area to its east, preserve the remains of a supposed Romano-British settlement. Remains of at least 15 stone-founded circular huts of from 4 metres (13 ft) to 6 metres (20 ft) diameter are evident, three within the fort and the remainder in a series of seven embanked enclosures outside it. A field system delineated by rubble and boulder boundaries is found to the south and east of the enclosures. A lacrymatory was discovered at the site in 1824, and a quern-stone in 1885. Historic England note that the "Iron Age defended settlement, Romano-British settlement and its field system south and east of Jenny's Lantern are extensive and particularly fine examples of their types" and note that survival of Romano-British field systems is rare, making the Jenny's Lantern site especially valuable.

The hillfort and settlement site has been placed on the Heritage at Risk Register, as its condition is found to be "generally unsatisfactory with major localised problems"; bracken is identified as the principal cause of vulnerability.
