= William de Stuteville =

12th century English noble

- Baron of Cottingham
- Died: 1203

William de Stuteville (died 1203) Baron of Cottingham in the East Riding of Yorkshire, Lord of Buttercrambe in the North Riding of Yorkshire, was an English noble.

He was the eldest son of Robert de Stuteville and Helewise de Murdac. William was appointed in Easter 1173 as governor of Knaresborough and Aldborough Castles and other estates in northern England. He was governor of Topcliffe Castle during the revolt of 1173-74 and was part of the force that captured King William I of Scotland at the Battle of Alnwick. William was appointed governor of Roxburgh Castle in Scotland in 1177. He was a justice itinerant in Yorkshire in 1189 and was sheriff of Northumberland in 1190. He did not go on the Third Crusade, staying in England. William was sent by William de Longchamp to arrest Hugh de Puiset in April 1190 and was appointed sheriff of Lincolnshire in 1191. In March 1193, he joined with Hugh Bardulf in preventing Archbishop Geoffrey of York from besieging Tickhill Castle, on the side of Prince John. Reconciled with Richard I, he was appointed in 1194, as one of the commissioners to settle the dispute between Archbishop Geoffrey and the canons of York. He held the wardship of William de Greystoke, when he served with during a campaign in Normandy in 1194. He married his sister Helewise to William de Greystoke. On the accession of John, William received charge of the counties of Northumberland and Cumberland. He received grants of fairs at Buttercrambe and Cottingham and by his influence at court was able to obtain a settlement of his dispute with William de Mowbray. John visited him at Cottingham in January 1201, and in that same year made him sheriff of Yorkshire and have a licence to embattle his manor at Cottingham and Buttercrambe. William died in 1203. His son Robert, who died in his minority without issue, his uncle Nicholas was their heir.

== Marriage and issue ==
William married Berta, niece of Ranulph de Glanville, they are known to have had the following issue:

- Robert de Stuteville (died 1205)
