= Hugh de Morville =

Hugh de Morville may refer to:

- Hugh de Morville, or Richard de Morville (fl. c. 1066), Norman noble
- Hugh de Morville, Constable of Scotland (died 1162), of Appleby in Westmorland, England, was a Norman knight
- Hugh de Morville, Lord of Westmorland (died 1202), Anglo-Norman knight who served King Henry II of England
- Hugh de Morville of Burgh (died 1202) Baron of Burgh, Lord of Kirkoswald.
