= John de Clifford of Newstead =

John de Clifford of Newstead and Ellingham was a 14th-century English Northumberland lord and outlaw. He was complicit in the planning and carrying out of the attack on and murder of Sir John de Coupland in 1363.

== Life ==
He was the second son of Robert de Clifford of Newstead and Elizabeth de Vaux. John succeeded his elder brother Robert, who died without issue, to the family estates. He is known to have had a younger brother Thomas.

Clifford, together with his brother Thomas, his cousins Richard, Adam and William de Vaux and other armed men, ambushed John de Coupland as he crossed the Bolton Moor in Northumberland and Coupland was slain.

After the murder of Coupland, the attackers fled to Scotland to escape arrest and wrath of the crown. Clifford was declared a traitor, disinherited and his lands forfeited and given to Coupland's widow.
