= William de Vescy of Kildare =

- Baron de Vesci (1313-1314)
- Coat of arms of William de Vescy
- Born: bef. 1297
- Died: 24 June 1314; Bannockburn
- Noble family: de Vesci
- Father: William de Vesci
- Mother: Devorgille

William de Vescy, sometimes spelt Vesci, Baron de Vesci (died 24 June 1314), was an illegitimate child of William de Vesci and Devorgille, daughter of Donal Roe Macarthy Mor, Prince of Desmond. He was born in Kildare, Ireland. As he was illegitimate, he had no right to inherit any of his father's properties. In anticipation of this, his father had therefore entered into a number of covenants with Antony Bek, Bishop of Durham designed to enable his son to acquire the properties through entail. Early in Edward I's reign, William asked the king to intervene to enforce the implementation of these covenants.

In 1300, William was summoned to serve in an army against the Scots.

He or his guardian Antony Bek, Prince Bishop of Durham, sold Alnwick Castle on 19 November 1309 to Henry de Percy, 1st Baron Percy. (For more details, see the entry on Lord Percy). It is unclear how much of the money William actually received. William was summoned to parliament on 8 January 1313, as Baron Vesci of Malton.

On 24 June 1314, while serving as a retainer of Aymer de Valence, Earl of Pembroke, William perished at the Battle of Bannockburn. His body was conveyed to York and interred in the chancel of St Mary's Abbey, York.

== Marriage and legacy ==
Although it is sometimes said that he married Maud, widow of Thomas Neville of Cleatham, this is unlikely. On his death without children, his estates in Lincolnshire and Yorkshire were inherited by a distant relation, Sir Gilbert Aton.

== Arms ==
William's coat of arms is recorded by the fourteenth-century Parliamentary Roll. It is emblazoned: Or, a plain cross Sable. The same coat of arms was borne by his uncle, John de Vesci (died 1289). William's stone effigy of an armed knight, that seems to have originally sat at St Mary's Abbey, shows the Vescy family coat of arms differenced with a bend sinister, a symbol of bastardy.
