= John de Coupland =

English knight and sheriff

John de Coupland (died 1363), also known as John Copeland, was the squire from Northumberland who captured David II of Scotland after the Battle of Neville's Cross in 1346. He was knighted for his actions, becoming a powerful figure in the north of England. However, his ruthless pursuit of power produced many enemies. He was ambushed and killed in 1363.

== Capture of David II ==
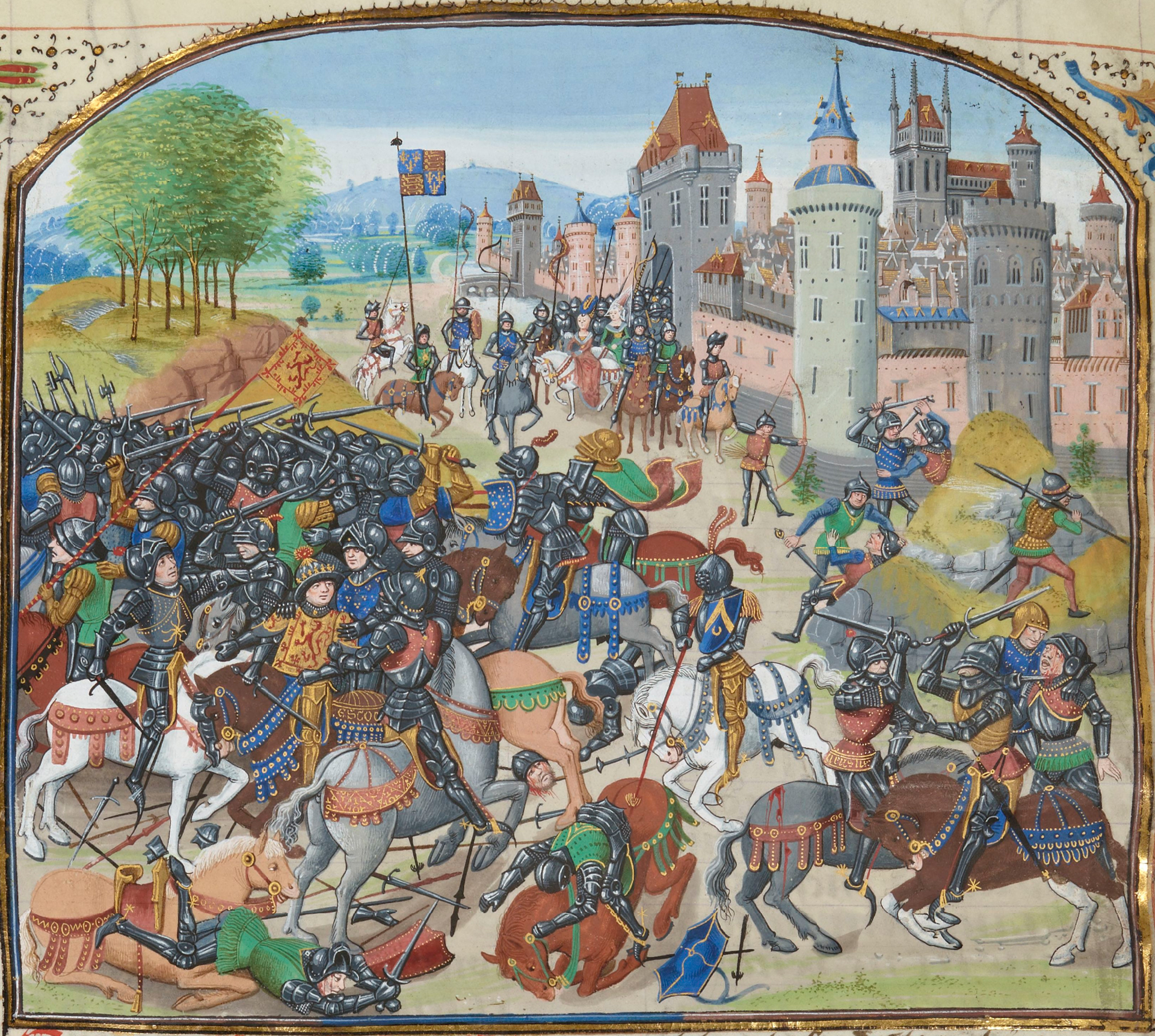
The Capture of King David at Neville's Cross

John de Coupland captured David II in the aftermath of the Battle of Neville's Cross on 16 October 1346. Sources state David was seriously wounded, struck by two arrows in the head, but attempted to fight off Coupland and managed to knock out two of his teeth. Upon David's capture, Coupland rode away from the site for 15 leagues until he came to a castle in Ogle. There he secured his prisoner. When Queen Philippa heard of David's capture, she requested Coupland bring him to her at once. Coupland refused, stating he would only surrender his prisoner to the King of England himself. Philippa then wrote to King Edward III, who was in Calais, to inform him of Coupland's actions. The king then summoned Coupland to Calais. Coupland secured David in a castle, rode to Dover then continued to Calais by sea.

When Coupland met with Edward, he explained that he meant no offense to the Queen but that his oath was to the King alone, thus his refusal to turn David over to the Queen. The King recognized Coupland's deed outweighed his trespass and told him to return to England and give David to the Queen. The king then rewarded Coupland by making him a knight banneret and giving him £500 a year for the rest of his life, along with £100 for remaining with the King with 20 men-at-arms. Coupland then returned to England, gathered his men and took David to the Queen at York. The Queen was content and took David for imprisonment in the Tower of London. David remained a prisoner of war for eleven years.

== Coupland's titles & land ==
Records indicate Coupland was in the King's service as early as 1339 when he was granted £20 annuity for this service. He continued in the King's service after the capture of David II and from 1347 to his death, was the Constable of Roxburgh Castle and Sheriff of Roxburghshire. For much of that time the English did not control Roxburghshire except for the castle, so the title was merely de facto during that period. Other titles include:

- Custodian of Berwick-on-Tweed from 1357-1362 with an interruption in 1362
- Escheator for county of Northumberland in 1354 & 1356
- Sheriff of Northumberland in 1350, 1351, 1353, 1354, 1356 and had custody of David in 1351, 1352, 1353 and 1356
- Deputy Warden of East March in 1359

There were often disruptions in his service, indicating Coupland had transgressed in various ways, but he was never publicly disgraced. Records also indicate that after his good fortune with the capture of David, John and his wife Joan became major landowners in Northern England along the Scottish border.

== Death ==
On 20 December 1363 Coupland was attacked and killed while crossing Bolton Moor. Nine of the attackers wielded lances and eleven were archers. The King ordered an inquiry to determine the cause of the attack and to arrest Coupland's murderers. The inquiry resulted in the naming of several involved individuals: John de Clifford, Thomas de Clifford, Thomas Forster and others. It was determined that it was a premeditated attack but the motive was not known. All involved were believed to have fled to Scotland, thus they were not arrested.

The King then ordered another inquiry the following year to attempt to arrest the murderers yet again. This inquiry led to the arrest of those who aided and abetted the named murderers. However, they were released after making payments to the King. The final and third inquiry was a general inquiry into the crimes in all of Northumberland. This resulted in more fines payable to the King and a pardon as well, except for those who committed treason or were responsible for the death of John de Coupland. This was the end of the inquiries and the murderers were never caught, leading to continuing debate about the motive for Coupland's death.

Coupland certainly had many enemies in the north of England. Michael A. Penman writes that,

Coupland's infamous and ruthless pursuit of land, revenues and power in northern England betrayed a character driven by self-interest, a hard-man whom the English crown had been forced to replace in office periodically in the face of complaints about his role as escheator. Coupland had already clashed with William, earl of Douglas, since 1353, being especially angered by the earl’s seizure of Selkirk forest, Hermitage Castle and Liddesdale.

King David had recently been released and returned to Scotland. Coupland was an opponent of peace with Scotland, and was seen as a hardliner who profited from war. Penman does not rule out David's involvement in his former captor's death. Coupland would have to be "pacified or otherwise neutralised" to ensure a peace deal.

== In literature ==
As "John Copland" he appears in the Elizabethan play Edward III, in which he gives a series of chivalric speeches defending his honour.
