= William de Vesci (d.1253) =

English noble

- Died: BEF 7 October 1253; Duchy of Gascony
- Buried: Watton Priory, Yorkshire
- Noble family: de Vesci
- Spouses: 1. Isabel de Longespée; 2. Agnes de Ferrers
- Father: Eustace de Vesci
- Mother: Lady Margaret of Scotland

William de Vesci or Vescy (died 1253) was a prominent 13th-century English noble. He was a son of Eustace de Vesci and Margaret, an illegitimate daughter of William the Lion by a daughter of Adam de Hythus.

A minor when his father died, he was placed under the wardship of William Longespée, Earl of Salisbury, until he was of age. Knighted in 1229, he took part in King Henry III of England's expedition to Brittany and France in 1230. He was banned from attending tournaments at Blyth, Northampton and Cambridge between 1232 and 1234. When King Alexander III of Scotland was invited to attend the English court in 1235 and in 1237, Vesci escorted Alexander III. William took part in King Henry III's expedition to Gascony in 1242. In 1245, he was part of King Henry III's expedition to Wales. He founded the Carmelite priory of Hulne, Northumberland during his lifetime.

He died shortly before 7 October 1253 during King Henry III's expedition to Gascony. It is not known whether he died in battle or from natural causes. He was buried at Watton Priory, Yorkshire.

== Marriage and issue ==
William firstly married Lady Isabel de Longespée, daughter of William Longespée, Earl of Salisbury and Ela, Countess of Salisbury in 1226. They had no issue.

William married secondly Lady Agnes de Ferrers, daughter of William de Ferrers, 5th Earl of Derby, and Sibyl Marshal, they had issue;

- John de Vesci, died 1289. He married firstly Agnes of Saluzzo and secondly Isabella de Beaumont. He had no issue.
- William de Vesci, died 1297. He inherited the great Marshal estates in Ireland from his maternal grandmother. He married Isabella de Perinton. He had no surviving legitimate issue.
- Juliana de Vesci, she married Richard de Vernon. Had issue.
- Agnes de Vesci, she married Roger de Buckton. Had issue.
- Isabel de Vesci, she married William de Welles. Had issue.

Agnes died in 1290 and was buried at the Greyfriars priory, Scarborough.

== Sources ==
- Smith, Brendan, ed. (1999). Britain and Ireland, 900–1300: Insular Responses to Medieval European Change. Cambridge University Press.
  - Stringer, Keith J. "Nobility and identity in medieval Britain and Ireland: the de Vescy family, c.1120–1314". In Smith (1999).
- This article incorporates text from a publication now in the public domain: "Vescy, John de". Dictionary of National Biography. London: Smith, Elder & Co. 1885–1900.
