= Hulne Priory =

Medieval ruin in Northumberland, England

Coordinates: 55.43492°N 1.74395°W

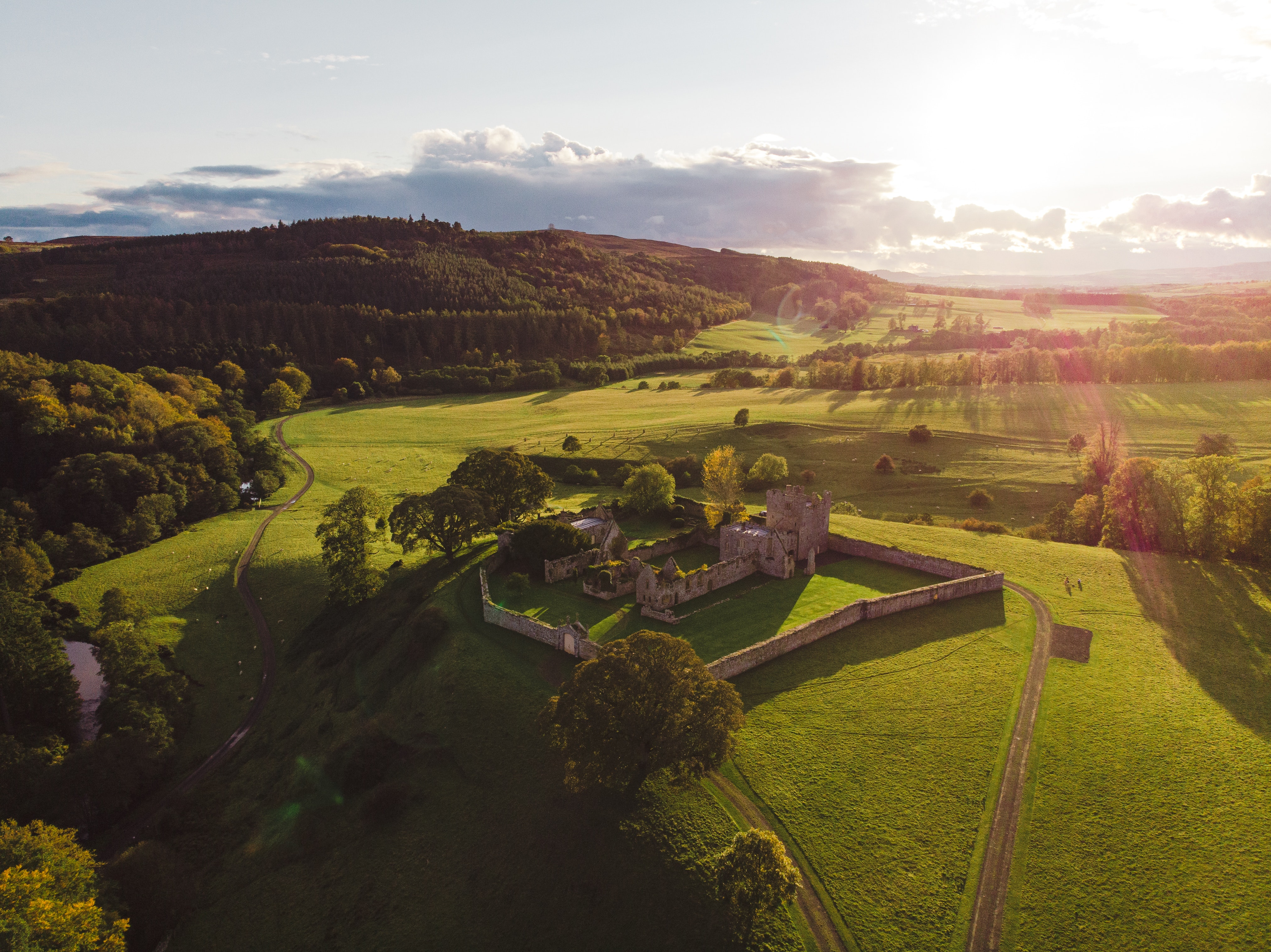
Hulne Priory

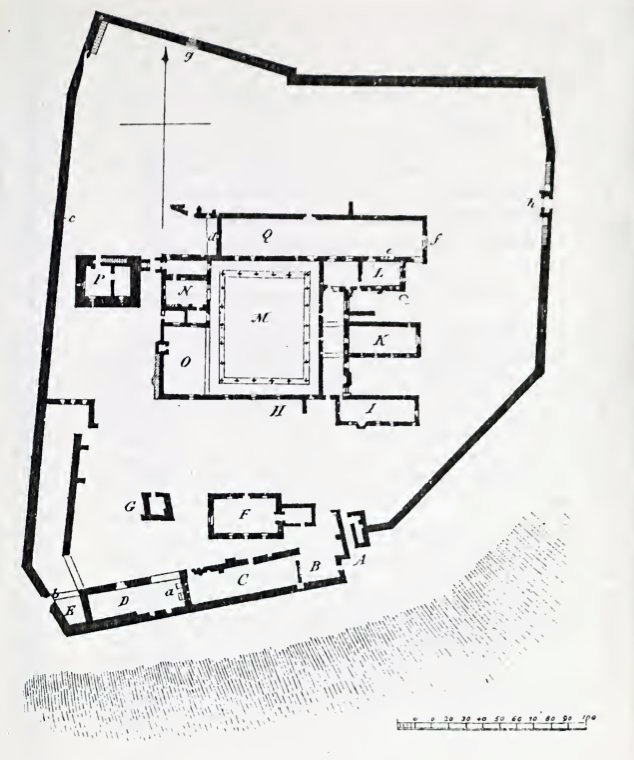
Ground plan of Hulne Priory Click on image for key

Hulne Priory, Hulne Friary or Hulne Abbey was a friary founded in 1240 by the Carmelites or 'Whitefriars'. It is said that the Northumberland site, quite close to Alnwick, was chosen for some slight resemblance to Mount Carmel where the order originated. Substantial ruins survive, watched over by the stone figures of friars carved in the 18th century. It is a sign of the unrest felt in this area so near to the border with Scotland that the priory had a surrounding wall and in the 15th century a pele tower was erected. Changes were made at the Dissolution of the Monasteries when the Percy family took control.

William II de Vesci was instrumental in bringing the Carmelites from the Crusader states to England by establishing Hulne Priory, located 2 miles (3.2 km) northwest of Alnwick. The priory is situated in Hulne Park, a walled park covering several thousand acres which belongs to the Duke of Northumberland and is close to Alnwick Castle. Originally a hunting park, and still used by the Duke for shooting, it now contains woods, moors, stretches of open grassland and Alnwick's home farm. Apart from the priory, the buildings in the park include the gatehouse of the former Alnwick Abbey, and Brizlee Tower, which is a viewing tower in Gothic Revival style that dates from the 1780s.

The public is admitted to Hulne Park, but it is not marketed as a visitor attraction and has no visitor facilities. Entry is via the approach from Alnwick, and is restricted to pedestrians only. The ruins of the priory may be viewed whilst Brizlee Tower is rarely open to the public.

Hulne Priory was a filming location in HTV's Robin of Sherwood with Michael Praed where it doubled for Kirklees Abbey. Later it was Maid Marian's home in the 1991 film Robin Hood: Prince of Thieves.

The priory is licensed for wedding ceremonies and is occasionally used as a location for live performances.

== See also ==
- Poppleton manuscript

== Sources ==
- Smith, Brendan, ed. (1999). Britain and Ireland, 900–1300: Insular Responses to Medieval European Change. Cambridge University Press.
  - Stringer, Keith J. "Nobility and identity in medieval Britain and Ireland: the de Vescy family, c.1120–1314". In Smith (1999).
