= Juliana de Vesci =

12th and 13th-century English noblewoman

Juliana de Vesci was the daughter of William de Vesci and Agnes Ferrers, daughter of William de Ferrers, 5th Earl of Derby. Juliana de Vesci married Sir Richard de Vernon, son of Sir Richard de Vernon and Margaret de Vipont.
