= William de Welles =

English noble

- Spouse: Isobel de Vesci
- Father: William de Welles

William de Welles, Lord of Welles, was an English noble.

== Life ==
The son of William de Welles of Alford. Welles paid a fine in 1279 for postponing his knighthood for three years. In 1283 he obtained a licence for a market every Tuesday, at his manor of Alford, Lincolnshire as well as a fair yearly on the eve, day, and morrow of the festival of the Holy Trinity. He nominated attorneys in May 1286, before he went beyond the seas with Hugh le Despenser, Earl of Winchester to Gascony.

== Marriage and issue ==
He married Isabel, daughter of William de Vesci and Agnes de Ferrers, they are known to have had the following issue:

- Adam de Welles (died 1311), married Joan Engaine, had issue.
- Phillip de Welles
- William de Welles of Cottness
- Walter de Welles, Canon and Abbot and Nuncio
- John de Welles, Treasurer
- Galfrid de Welles
- Richard de Welles
- Cecilia de Welles, nun of Greenfield Priory
- Margaret de Welles, prioress of Greenfield Priory
- Aline de Welles
