= Synod of Twyford =

The Synod of Twyford was a synod of the early English church held in 684 and described by Bede in his Historia ecclesiastica gentis Anglorum, Book IV, ch. 28.

The synod was held at a place called "Adtwifyrdi", the location of which is unknown. Adtwifyrdi is the name used by the Venerable Bede to describe the meeting of river and tributary at the mouth of the River Aln at Northumberland. At that time there was an Anglo Saxon church at a place called Church Hill. However, coastal erosion and the Dissolution of the Monasteries means that the exact site is now lost.

Archbishop Theodore presided over the synod in the presence of King Ecgfrith. The purpose of the meeting was to elect a new bishop. Previously Theodore had appointed Tunberht as the Bishop of Hexham and Eata as the Bishop of Lindisfarne. Tunberht was deposed at the Synod.

Cuthbert was elected Bishop of Hexham, but declined to come out of retirement and take the post. After a visit from King Ecgfrith and other delegates, he eventually agreed to swap with Eata and become the elected bishop of Lindisfarne.
