= Longhoughton =

Village in Northumberland, England

Coordinates: 55.433°N 1.614°W

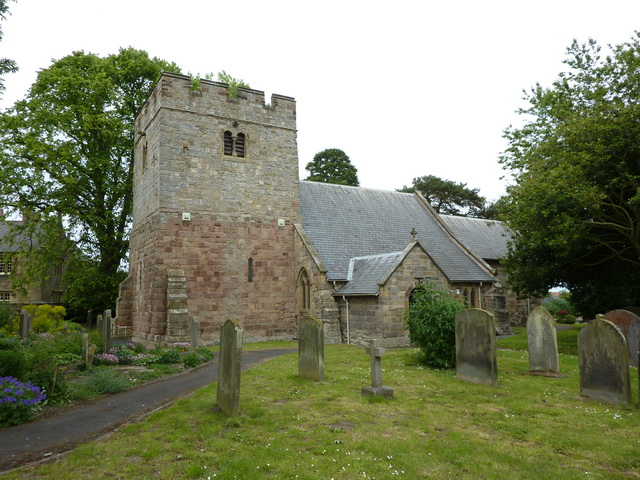
- Longhoughton Church

- Location within Northumberland
- Population: 1,960 (2011 census)
- OS grid reference: NU244155
- Shire county: Northumberland
- Region: North East
- Country: England
- Sovereign state: United Kingdom
- Post town: ALNWICK
- Postcode district: NE66
- Police: Northumbria
- Fire: Northumberland
- Ambulance: North East
- UK Parliament: North Northumberland

Longhoughton is a small rural village in Northumberland, England. It lies near the coast, about 4.5 miles (7.2 km) northeast of Alnwick, in the similarly named parish of Longhoughton.

The village lies under the spectacular whinstone outcrop, Ratcheugh Crag, near which local point-to-point racing is often conducted.

The parish church does double duty since it is also the church of the nearby RAF Boulmer.

== History ==
The village has a turbulent history and was often sacked in mediaeval times. From the 12th century to recently, the village was noted for its water and corn mills.

There was local industry based on limestone, coal and lead although agriculture was always the main occupation.

On top of Ratcheugh Crag is the Robert Adam-designed Ratcheugh Observatory, built by Hugh Percy, 1st Duke of Northumberland.

== Governance ==
Longhoughton is in the parliamentary constituency of Berwick-upon-Tweed. The MP for this constituency is currently David Smith, the Labour candidate who was elected in 2024. An electoral ward in the same name exists. This ward stretches north along the coast and east to Powburn. The ward has a total population taken at the 2011 census of 4,424.

== Transport ==
Longhoughton once had a railway station on the main line of the North East Railway.

== Buildings ==
The parish church of St. Peter and St. Paul dates from the Saxon era, although it was rebuilt in 1080 and now the only remaining Saxon stonework is seen in parts of the chancel and tower arches. During the 1080 rebuilding, a 44-foot (13 m) tower was added. This was for purposes of military defence, rather than religious use, and was used as such until the 17th century. Parish records go back as far as 1646.

Smugglers used to use the church as a distribution centre in the 19th century. Nikolaus Pevsner mentioned the building favourably in his review of Northumbrian architecture.

A little over a mile to the north-west is Littlehoughton Hall, a house of 1686 with later additions, which incorporates the remains of a late medieval tower house.

Longhoughton Community and Sports Centre Trust has been presented with the King’s Award for Voluntary Service.

=== Individuals ===
- Jeremy Pickard: 22 December 2025.
