= William I de Greystoke =

12th-13th century English noble

William de Greystoke
- Baron of Greystoke
- Arms of Baron of Greystoke: Barry argent and azure three chaplets of roses gules.
- Died: 1209
- Noble family: Greystoke family

William de Greystoke (died 1209), sometimes known as William FitzRanulf, Baron of Greystoke, was an English noble.

He was the eldest son of Ranulph de Greystoke and Amabel Balliol. William was in his minority when his father died. He was under the wardship of William de Stuteville before 1194, when he served during a campaign in Normandy. He was married to Helewise, the widow of William de Lancaster and Hugh de Morville, she was the daughter of Robert de Stuteville and Helewise de Murdac. William died in 1209 and was succeeded by his son Thomas, who was a minor.
