= Beatrix de Vesci =

Anglo-Norman noblewoman

- Baroness of Alnwick Castle
- Born: Alnwick Castle, Northumberland
- Died: c. 1125; Knaresborough, Yorkshire
- Husband: Eustace Fitz John (1089–1157)
- Father: Ivo de Vesci (c. 1045 – c. 1100)

Beatrix de Vesci of Alnwick Castle (died circa 1125), was an English noblewoman and heir of house de Vesci.

== Life ==
Daughter and sole heir of Ivo de Vesci, Builder and first Baron and his wife, Alda, Beatrix de Vesci was one of the richest heiresses of her time. She was the first wife of Eustace Fitz John, also known as Eustacius fitz John de Burgo, Constable of Chestershire and Knaresborough.

According to Dugdale, Beatrix had two sons, William and Geoffrey. However, it is most often said that she died during childbirth of her first and only son, William de Vesci. William de Vesci took his mother's surname and would become the ancestor of the de Vesci baronial house. William served as Sheriff of Northumberland from 1157 to 1170, and Sheriff of Lancashire from 1166 to 1170.

Upon the death of Eustace fitz John, his lands passed to his son William by consent of King Henry II.

Beatrix de Vesci's grandson, Eustace de Vesci, was one of the Surety Barons of Magna Carta.
