= De Vesci =

Norman noble family

Modern coat of arms of de Vesci. Or, a cross sable

Ancient coat of arms of de Vesci. Gules, a cross flory argent

de Vesci (Vescy, Vecey, Vesey, Vasey, Vessey, Veasie, Veazey, Veasy and Veasey) is the surname of an old Norman noble family originating from Vassy, Calvados, also known as the House of de Vesci. The first records are about Robert de Vesci, Norman conqueror and Ivo de Vesci, Lord of Alnwick. The de Vesci family held lands in England, Ireland, Saluzzo in Piedmont and in Sicily. The family was also linked to the Scottish Crown through the marriage of Eustace de Vesci to Margaret, the oldest but illegitimate child and daughter of William the Lion by a daughter of Adam de Hythus. William de Vesci was one of the competitors for the Crown of Scotland, upon the death of Margaret, Maid of Norway in 1290.

It is thought to be the origin of the name Vesely in England.

== French origin ==
The family descend from Hugh, Lord of Vassy (Waacie).

== England ==
Robert de Vesci obtained lands in Northamptonshire, Warwick, Lincoln, and Leicester.

Ivo de Vesci obtained lands and the lordship of Alnwick in Northumberland from King William II of England. His heiress Beatrix de Vesci married Eustace fitz John, with their child William taking his mother's name. His descendants held lands in Malton, Yorkshire. Warin de Vesci, son of Eustace de Vesci, held lands in Knapton, Yorkshire.

== Ireland ==
Through Agnes de Vesci, née de Ferrer, the family obtained lands in 1247 in County Kildare, including Kildare Castle. Agnes's son William inherited the lands in 1290. However he quarrelled fiercely with Sir John FitzThomas, Lord Offaly and surrendered the lands in 1297 to the crown.

== Scotland ==
Gilbert de Vesci, settled in Scotland shortly after the Conquest and obtained the lands of Ayton in Berwickshire, and adopted the name of the lands as his family name. Eustace de Vesci obtained the Lordship of Sprouston in Roxburghshire and other lands as part of the dowry of his wife Margaret of Scotland, illegitimate daughter of King William of Scotland.

== See also ==
- Viscount de Vesci
- Baron Vesci
