= Nicholas I de Stuteville =

12th-13th century English noble

Nicholas de Stuteville
- Baron of Liddel
- Died: 1218

Nicholas I de Stuteville (died 1218) Baron of Liddel and Cottingham, was an English noble.

He was the second son of Robert de Stuteville and Helewise Murdac. Nicholas was heir to his brother William. He was one of the barons who met at Stamford in 1216. Nicholas was captured at the Battle of Lincoln on 20 May 1217, by William Marshall and paid 1,000 marks for his release. He died in 1218 and was succeeded by his grandson Eustace.

== Marriage and issue ==
Nicholas’s wife was Gunnora d'Aubigny daughter of Raoul de Aubigny and Sybil de Valgones, they had the following known issue:

- Robert de Stuteville (died 1213), married Sibyl de Valognes, had issue.
- Nicholas de Stuteville, married Dervorguilla daughter of Lochlann of Galloway, had Joan de Stuteville she married Hugh Wake and secondly Hugh le Bigod and Margaret de Stuteville she married William de Mustac
