= Richard de Vernon (died 1329) =

- Died: 1329
- Spouses: 1. Alianore de Frenes; 2. Juliana de Vesci
- Father: Richard de Vernon
- Mother: Margaret de Vipont

Richard de Vernon, Lord of Nether Haddon, was an English noble.

== Life ==
Richard was the son of Richard de Vernon and Margaret de Vipont. He died in 1329.

== Marriage and issue ==
He married, firstly, Alianore, daughter of Giles de Frenes of Pitchcott. She died without issue.

Secondly, he married Juliana, daughter of William de Vesci and Agnes de Ferrers. They are known to have had the following known issue:

- Richard de Vernon (died 1322), married Matilda (Maud) Camville, had issue.
