= Eustace fitz John =

12th-century Anglo-Norman nobleman

- Died: July 1157; Flintshire, Wales
- Cause of death: Killed in battle
- Years active: 1119 to 1157
- Known for: Founder of Alnwick Abbey, Malton Priory and Watton Priory
- Title: Lord of Alnwick, Malton and Watton; Constable of Bamburgh and Knaresborough Castles
- Spouse(s): Beatrix de Vescy (died before 1130); Agnes FitzNigel
- Children: William de Vescy (Beatrix); Richard fitz Eustace (Agnes of Halton)
- Parent: John fitzRichard
- Relatives: Pain fitzJohn (brother); William fitzJohn (brother); Agnes (sister); Alice (sister)

Eustace fitz John (died 1157), Constable of Chester, was a powerful magnate in northern England during the reigns of Henry I, Stephen and Henry II. From a relatively humble background in South East England, Eustace made his career serving Henry I, and was elevated by the king through marriage and office into one of the most important figures in the north of England. Eustace acquired a great deal of property in the region, controlled Bamburgh Castle, and served jointly with Walter Espec as justiciar of the North.

After Henry I's death in 1135, Eustace became involved in the Anarchy, the warfare between the supporters of Stephen and his rival the Empress Matilda, the latter led by Matilda's uncle David, King of Scotland. He surrendered Alnwick Castle and Malton Castle temporarily to David, while Bamburgh was taken by Stephen. Eustace became a supporter of David, fighting and suffering defeat at the Battle of the Standard in 1138. He maintained most of his lands in the north, however, and from around 1144 became one of the main followers of Ranulf II, Earl of Chester, through whom he gained even more land. Eustace subsequently founded three religious houses and died on a campaign with Henry II in 1157.

== Origins and early career ==
Eustace's family came from the southeast of England. His father John fitzRichard was a tenant-in-chief who appeared in the Domesday Book owning estates in Essex and Norfolk. The family was not of exalted origin, representing the middle rank of society. Eustace had two known sisters, Agnes and Alice. He also had two brothers, Pain (Payne) and William, and it is thought that Pain—whose career was as successful as Eustace's—was probably the eldest. Eustace likely did not inherit much from his father but instead depended on success as a royal servant.

Eustace is witnessing royal charters from at least 1119, but may have been at Henry's court as early as 1114. Through Henry's patronage, Eustace married two heiresses, both of whom brought him lands. Beatrix de Vesci, daughter and heiress of Ivo de Vesci, brought him control of Alnwick Castle and the barony of Alnwick in Northumberland. He probably received, in addition, land in Lincolnshire as well as five-and-a-half knight's fees in Yorkshire previously belonging to Ranulf de Mortimer (died 1104). Although it has often been claimed that this marriage brought Eustace the lordship of Old Malton, a former royal manor in the North Riding of Yorkshire, this was probably a separate gift from the king. Eustace's marriage to Beatrix occurred sometime before 1130.

The other marriage, which also occurred before 1130, was to Agnes daughter of the constable of Chester William fitz Nigel, and this eventually brought Eustace more land in Yorkshire at Bridlington as well as in Northamptonshire at Loddington. Both landholdings were held from the earl of Chester. Eustace would gain control of many other sub-tenancies, held from a number of lords, including the Archbishop of York, Bishop of Durham, Nigel d'Aubigny and the count of Aumale, and in Henry's reign he held lands at Aldborough, Tickhill and Knaresborough from the king as a tenant-in-chief.

Eustace had thus emerged as one of the key players in Henry's reordering of Northumbrian society following the destruction of the earldom of Northumbria in the late 11th century. According to historian William Kapelle, Eustace was one of the "three mainstays of Henry's new regime in the North", the other two being Walter Espec and King David of Scotland. In Northumberland he is known to have commanded authority over at least ten local notables, including John FitzOdard lord of Embleton and Robert II de Umfraville lord of Redesdale. Eustace's barony of Alnwick stretched across the potential Scottish invasion routes of the Tweed basin and was one of the two largest baronies in the county, (Note: The other being the Balliol barony of Bywell.) holding between 14 and 17 knight's fees by 1166, nearly three times the size of the average lordship in the county.

Henry I's only surviving pipe roll, for 1129–30, shows that Eustace served jointly as justiciar of the north along with Walter Espec, and had custody of the former capital of the Northumbrian earldom, Bamburgh Castle. Allowances made to Eustace for the repair of the gate of Bamburgh Castle and the construction of fortifications at Tickhill and Knaresborough in Yorkshire are also recorded in this pipe roll. This and evidence of royal writs show that Eustace and Walter Espec had justiciar responsibility for the counties of Cumberland, Northumberland, Durham, and Yorkshire, a role that involved hearing pleas and conveying instructions from central government.

== The Anarchy ==
The death of Henry I on 1 December 1135, led to the accession of Stephen de Blois, to whom Eustace submitted. Stephen's seizure of the throne was contested by Henry I's daughter, the Empress Matilda, who had been Henry's designated heir. The Gesta Stephani claimed that certain "very intimate friends of Henry" had been against Stephen from the beginning because of loyalty to Henry's daughter Matilda, and names Eustace's brother Pain as one of these, making it quite possible that Eustace had likewise never been on Stephen's side. However, they, just like Eustace, did swear fealty to Stephen after a short time. This capitulation meant that Stephen let them keep the honours and positions they had held under Henry, and Stephen is even found confirming the grants of Eustace's family between 1136 and 1138.

Matilda was supported by her uncle King David of Scotland, and he did not accept Stephen's succession peacefully. Thus Eustace was placed in the front line of a new war. When David invaded northern England, Eustace's castle of Alnwick was among those captured by David in the first two months of the year (though it was returned in March). Stephen relieved Eustace of control of Bamburgh Castle when he returned from his punitive invasion of Lothian early in 1138. It has been claimed that Eustace must have gone over to David's side by the end of 1137 when David invaded northern England. There is no proof, however, that Eustace had switched allegiance at this point.

After David crossed back into Northumberland in April 1138, Eustace became one of David's active supporters, and during David's siege of Wark Castle in May, Eustace tried to persuade him to besiege Bamburgh Castle instead. Eustace had had a long association with the Scottish king, or at least with his Norman follower Robert I de Brus, as Eustace's name appears as a witness to David's charter recording the grant of Annandale to Robert, issued at Scone in 1124.

Eustace fought at the Battle of the Standard in August 1138, fighting for David in the second line with the men of Cumbria and Teviotdale. The battle ended in defeat, and Eustace was wounded and fled to Alnwick in its aftermath, leaving his castle at Malton to be captured soon after. Despite the defeat of David, peace the following year brought David victory, his son Henry becoming Earl of Northumbria and Huntingdon, and under the rule of Earl Henry, Eustace regained many of his Northumberland possessions and received other lands in the earldom of Huntingdon. When a succession dispute for the bishopric of Durham erupted in 1141, Eustace supported the pro-David William Cumin against William de Ste Barbara; and in 1143, Eustace helped negotiate a truce between the two claimants.

Eustace's number of known associations with David and Henry after 1144 is small, appearing only as a witness to one charter of Earl Henry issued at Corbridge at some point between 1150 and 1152. Around 1144 Eustace seems to have entered a beneficial relationship with Ranulf II, Earl of Chester. Eustace was married to the sister of Ranulf's constable, William fitz William, and in 1143 or 1144 William died. This made Eustace's wife and her sister Matilda joint heiress to the lands and offices of William, who was childless.

In either 1144 or 1145, Eustace obtained from Ranulf a large honour with lands mostly in Cheshire, Lancashire and Yorkshire, and gained the office of constable of Chester along with the status as chief counsellor in Ranulf's dominions. Earl Ranulf's patronage also seems to have gained Eustace a grant by Roger de Mowbray (the earl's captive from the Battle of Lincoln) of fourteen knight fees worth of estates in Yorkshire and Lincolnshire, with townships along the river Humber. This was probably part of the attempts of the earl and his half-brother the Earl of Lincoln William de Roumare to tighten their family's grip on the region. Eustace's position vis-à-vis Stephen probably mirrored that of Ranulf, and like other pro-Matildans there was probably no permanent stabilisation of relations until the settlement between Stephen and Matilda in the winter of 1153. In the following year, Eustace attested a charter King Stephen issued at York in favour of Pontefract Priory.

== Death and legacy ==
Eustace had a good relationship with Stephen's successor Henry II, and the latter seems to have regarded Eustace as one of his supporters. Henry confirmed Eustace's gifts to his son William de Vescy and would recognise the latter's succession to his father's lands. After Henry's accession in 1154, Eustace attested to the new king's charters. Eustace died in July 1157 at the Battle of Ewloe near Basingwerk in Flintshire, where on a campaign with Henry against the Welsh he was ambushed and killed.

Eustace fitz John was remembered as a great monastic patron. He patronised Gloucester Abbey, a Benedictine house, as well as the Augustinian Priory of Bridlington. In 1147, he founded his own abbey, Alnwick Abbey, as a daughter-house of England's first Premonstratensian monastery, Newhouse Abbey in Lincolnshire. Two years later, Eustace turned his favours to the order of Gilbert of Sempringham, in 1150 founding a Gilbertine priory at Malton in Yorkshire and another priory (with a nunnery) at Watton (also Yorkshire) around the same time. Later tradition held that Eustace founded these houses in penance for fighting alongside the Scots, but there is no original evidence for this.

He founded Watton, scene of Ailred of Rievaulx's De Sanctimoniali de Wattun, jointly with a William Fossard. Eustace's patronage of the Gilbertines was probably influenced by William, Earl of York and Henry Murdac, Archbishop of York. Eustace witnessed two of Earl William's charters between 1150 and 1153, and obtained land from him. Eustace's name appears on coins minted at York, a city under the control of the earl.

Several sources, including Roger of Howden, report that Eustace had only one eye; however, this is likely to be a reference to his father, John "Monoculus" FitzRichard.

== Marriage and issue ==
Eustace fitz John married twice. His first wife was Beatrix de Vesci, daughter and heiress of Ivo de Vesci, and they had one known son;

- William de Vesci (d. 1184), married Burga, daughter of Robert III de Stuteville, and had issue. William was the sheriff of Northumberland between 1157 and 1170, and would become the ancestor of the Northumberland de Vescy family.

Beatrix is recorded to have died in childbirth. Eustace married, secondly, Agnes de Halton, daughter of William fitz Nigel. He inherited the barony of Halton through this marriage. They had two known sons;

- Richard fitz Eustace (d.c. 1163), married Aubrey de Lisours, daughter of Robert de Lisours by Aubrey, sister of Ilbert II de Lacy (another baron captured by Earl Ranulf at the Battle of Lincoln), and had issue. He became ancestor of a second line of de Lacys.
- Geoffrey fitz Eustace, named as his son in a charter of Watton Priory.
