= Eustace de Vesci =

English lord and Magna Carta surety

- Lord of Alnwick
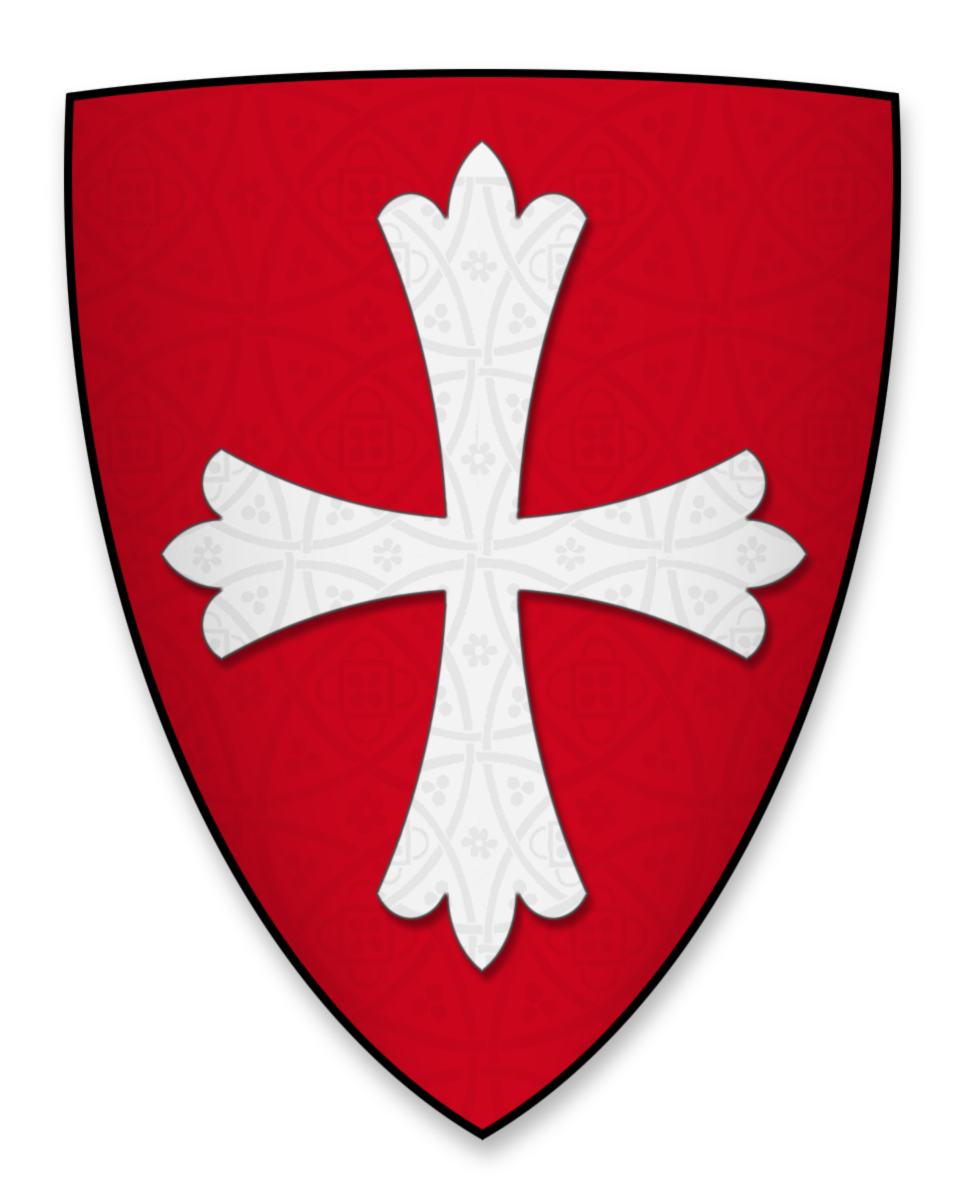
- Arms of Eustace de Vescy, Lord of Alnwick Castle. Gules, a cross flory/patonce argent
- Died: 1216; Barnard Castle, County Durnham
- Buried: Alnwick Abbey
- Noble family: de Vesci
- Spouse: Margaret of Scotland
- Issue: William
- Father: William de Vesci
- Mother: Burga de Stuteville

Eustace de Vesci (1169–1216) was an English lord of Alnwick Castle, and a Magna Carta surety. He also held lands in Sprouston, Roxburghshire, Scotland as brother in-law to King Alexander II of Scotland. Eustace was a leader during the Barons' War in 1215 and was killed while undertaking a siege of Barnard Castle in 1216.

== Early life ==
His parents were William de Vesci and Burga de Stuteville, daughter of Robert III de Stuteville. He paid his relief on coming of age in 1190. Claims by The Baronial Order of Magna Charta & The Military Order of The Crusades that he was with King Richard I of England in Palestine in 1191 are seemingly unsupported by primary sources. On 13 August 1199 he appeared as one of the guarantors of the treaty between the new king John of England and Renaud I, Count of Dammartin, and in the same year, probably later, he was sent to William the Lion of Scotland to promise him satisfaction of his rights in England, and witnessed his homage on 22 November 1200.

He witnessed charters frequently in the early years of John's reign, in 1209 was one of the guardians of the bishopric of Durham, and on 10 April of the same year he was sent to meet William The Lion on his visit to England. He was serving the king in Ireland from June to August 1210. Accused of conspiring against John in 1212, he fled to Scotland. A tale of John's attempted seduction of his wife, and the trick played on him, first appears in Walter of Hemingburgh and bears a close resemblance to a classical model.

His lands were seized, but after John's submission to the pope he was forced to invite Vescy back (27 May 1213), though orders were sent on the same day to Philip of Oldcoates to cripple him by destroying his castle of Alnwick. On 18 July 1213 he was one of the recipients of John's pledge to abide by the decision of the pope concerning the things about which he had been excommunicated. On 5 November 1214 Pope Innocent III warned him not to trouble the king.

== The Barons' Revolt ==
He was a leader in the First Barons' War, in 1215 marching south against King John I with Robert Fitzwalter. He was prominent among the barons who wrung Magna Carta from John, and was one of the twenty-five appointed to see it carried out. He was excommunicated by name with others of the barons in 1216. In the ensuing confusion, he supported Louis, the French prince, who was claiming the English throne. He was killed at a siege of Barnard Castle; while he accompanied Alexander II of Scotland on his way to do homage to Louis of France, on the way they laid siege to Barnard Castle, belonging to Hugh de Balliol, and, approaching too near, Vescy was shot through the head by an arrow.

His lands were confiscated and given to Simon de Champ Rémy, Philip de Ulecot, and William de Harcourt.

== Family ==
He married Margaret, half-sister of King Alexander II of Scotland, an illegitimate daughter of William the Lion by a daughter of Adam de Hythus. They had:

- William de Vesci, who was father of John de Vesci and of William de Vescy. The latter was one of the Competitors for the Crown of Scotland in 1291.
