= Aldborough Castle =

Castle in North Yorkshire, England

Coordinates: 54.0881°N 1.3798°W

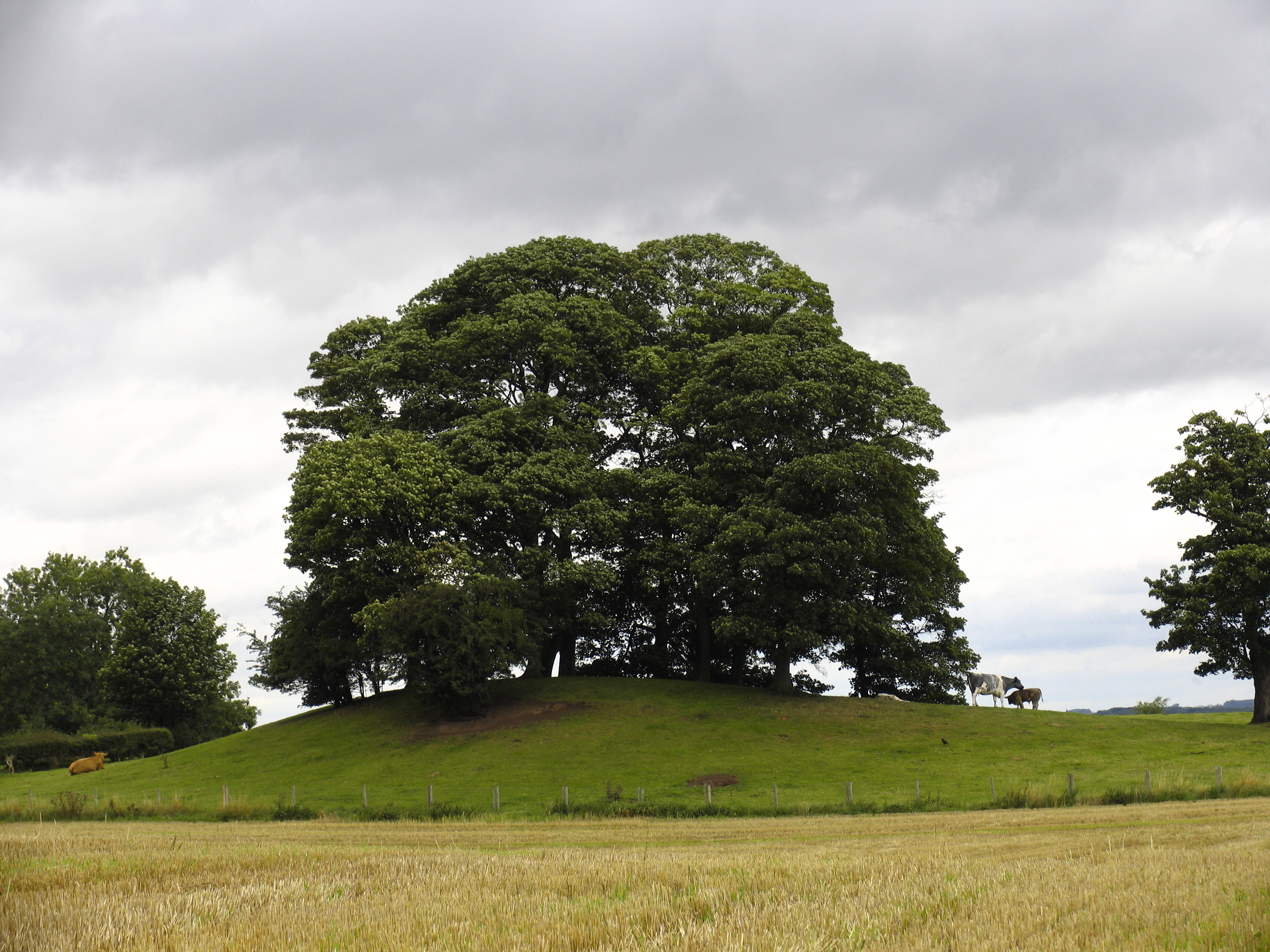
Motte of Aldborough Castle, known as Studforth Hill, in 2010.

Aldborough Castle was located near the village of Aldborough, North Yorkshire, England.

The castle was located to the south-west of the village, built upon the former Roman amphitheatre. The motte is called Studforth Hill. Studforth is a corruption of Stuteville, the family who at one time owned the castle. Constructed as a motte and bailey or ringwork fortification, it was likely to have been surrounded by a timber palisade.

Originally held from the English crown, briefly held in chief by the Stuteville family between 1175 and 1205, before returning to Crown ownership.

The castle was probably abandoned during the 13th century. The earthworks have been damaged by ploughing.
