= Hugh de Morville of Burgh =

12th-13th century English noble

Hugh de Morville
- Baron of Burgh
- Died: 1202
- Noble family: Morville family

Hugh de Morville (died 1202) Baron of Burgh, Lord of Kirkoswald, was an English noble.

He was the only son of Simon de Morville and Ada d’Engaine. He succeeded to his father’s estates and later his mother’s more significant inheritance. Hugh was granted a licence in 1201, by King John of England to crenellate his manor house at Kirkoswald in 1201. He died in 1202 and his wife Helewise remarried William de Greystoke. He is sometimes confused with a kinsman, Hugh de Morville, Constable of Scotland, whose parentage is unclear. He maintained familial ties with English, Scottish and Welsh cousins as a way to maintain peace and prosperity. His strategically located castle at Kirkoswald was destroyed by Scotland in 1314 and rebuilt shortly thereafter.

== Marriage and issue ==
Hugh married Helewise, the widow of William fitz William de Lancaster (son of William de Lancaster I). Hugh's kinsman Richard de Morville, Constable of Scotland after his father, was married to William fitz William's sister Avice. Helewise was the daughter of Robert de Stuteville and Helewise Murdac, they are known to have had the following known issue:

- Joan de Morville, married Richard Gernun and had issue.
- Ada de Morville, married firstly Richard de Luci, with issue and married secondly Thomas de Multon, also with issue.
