= Hulne Park =

Park in Northumberland, England

- Location within Northumberland
- Location: Alnwick, Northumberland, England
- OS grid: NU161153
- Coordinates: 55.432°N 1.745°W

Hulne Park is the only one remaining of the three parks that once surrounded Alnwick Castle in Northumberland, providing wood and meat for the Percy family, the Dukes of Northumberland. The park is walled, and was landscaped by Capability Brown.

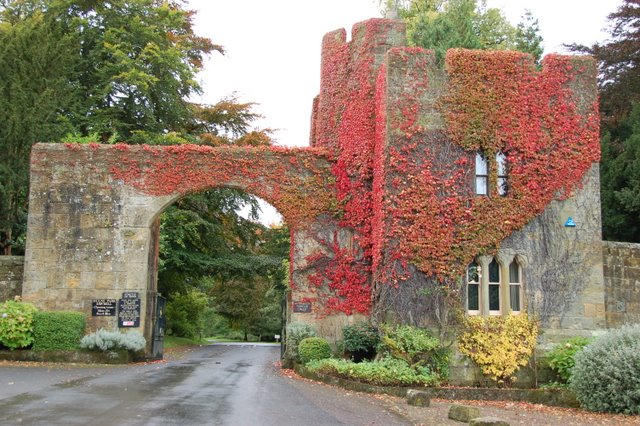
Entrance to Hulne Park

It is the site of Hulne Priory, Brizlee Tower and Alnwick Abbey, although access to the latter is no longer available to the general public. A cave called the Nine Year Aud Hole is found within the park; its entrance is guarded by a Grade-II-listed, probably 18th-century, statue of a White Friar.

The park is open to walkers only, without dogs, between 11 a.m. and sunset most days of the year; it may occasionally be closed to the public for private events to take place.
