= Justice itinerant =

12th century English noble

A Justice Itinerant was a royal appointed official sent to the English counties and Ireland to administer justice.
