= Robert III de Stuteville =

12th century English noble

Robert de Stuteville
- Baron of Cottingham
- Died: 1186

Robert III de Stuteville (died 1186) was an English baron and justiciar.

== Life ==
He was son of Robert II de Stuteville (from Estouteville in Normandy), one of the northern barons who commanded the English at the battle of the Standard in August 1138. His grandfather, Robert Grundebeof, had supported Robert of Normandy at the battle of Tinchebray in 1106, where he was taken captive and kept in prison for the rest of his life.

Robert de Stuteville, the third, occurs as witness to a charter of Henry II of England on 8 January 1158 at Newcastle-on-Tyne. He was a justice itinerant in the counties of Cumberland and Northumberland in 1170–1171, and High Sheriff of Yorkshire from Easter 1170 to Easter 1175. The king's Knaresborough Castle and Appleby Castle were in his custody in April 1174, when they were captured by David of Scotland, Earl of Huntingdon.

Stuteville, with his brothers and sons, was active in support of the king during the war of 1174, and he took a prominent part in the capture of William the Lion at Alnwick on 13 July (Rog. Hov. ii. 60). He was one of the witnesses to the Spanish award on 16 March 1177, and from 1174 to 1181 was constantly in attendance on the king, both in England and abroad.

He seems to have died in the early part of 1186. He claimed the barony, which had been forfeited by his grandfather, from Roger de Mowbray, who by way of compromise gave him Kirby Moorside.

He is the probable founder of the nunneries of Keldholme and Rosedale, Yorkshire, and was a benefactor of Rievaulx Abbey.

== Family ==
Stuteville by his wife, Helewise de Murdac, he had two sons William and Nicholas and two daughters, Burga, who was married to William de Vesci and Helewise, who was married firstly to William de Lancaster, secondly to Hugh de Morville and thirdly to William de Greystoke. He may have also had sons Robert, Eustace and Osmund.

Robert de Stuteville was probably brother of the Roger de Stuteville who was sheriff of Northumberland from 1170 to 1185, and defended Wark on Tweed Castle against William the Lion in 1174. Roger received charge of Edinburgh Castle in 1177, and he built the first Burton Agnes Manor House. However Roger may have been his kinsman, not his brother, as son of Osmund de Stuteville (b. about 1125, of Burton Agnes, Yorkshire, England, d. before Sep 1202) and his wife (m. abt 1146) Isabel de Gressinghall, daughter of William Fitz Roger de Gressinghall.
