= Ivo de Vesci =

11th century English noble

- Born: 11th-century Duchy of Normandy
- Noble family: de Vesci
- Spouse: Alda
- Father: Robert de Veci (?)
- Occupation: knight landowner

Ivo de Vesci, sometimes spelt Vescy and first name sometimes Yves, was a prominent 11th-century Anglo-Norman noble. He obtained lands and the lordship of Alnwick in Northumberland from King William II of England. He was also given lands in Malton, Yorkshire. It is not known whether he is the son or kinsman of the Robert de Veci who participated in the Norman conquest of England and was rewarded with great estates in the counties of Northampton, Warwick and Lincoln. Ivo erected the first parts of the Alnwick Castle in about 1096.

== Marriage and issue ==
He married Alda Tyson, daughter of William Tyson, the former lord of Alnwick. They had an issue:

- Beatrix de Vesci, died c.1130. She married Eustace Fitz John (d 1157), Constable of Chestershire and Knaresborough. By his marriage to Beatrix, Eustace gained the Baronies of Malton and Alnwick. Beatrix died at Knaresborough Castle giving birth to their son, William.
