= Alnwick Castle =

Castle in Northumberland, England

- Alnwick, Northumberland
- Alnwick Castle viewed from the Pastures, on the other side of the river Aln

Site information
- Owner: The 12th Duke of Northumberland

Location
- Location within Northumberland
- Coordinates: 55.4158°N 1.7062°W

Site history
- Built: 11th century

Listed Building – Grade I
- Official name: Alnwick Castle The Castle, Stable Court and Covered Riding School, including West Wall of Riding School
- Designated: 20 February 1952
- Reference no.: 1371308

National Register of Historic Parks and Gardens
- Official name: Alnwick Castle
- Type: Grade I
- Designated: 1 January 1985
- Reference no.: 1001041

Alnwick Castle (/ˈænɪk/) is a castle and country house in Alnwick in the English county of Northumberland. It is the seat of the 12th Duke of Northumberland, built following the Norman Conquest and renovated and remodelled several times. It is a Grade I listed building now the home of Ralph Percy, 12th Duke of Northumberland and his family. In 2016, the castle received over 600,000 visitors per year when combined with adjacent attraction the Alnwick Garden.

== History ==
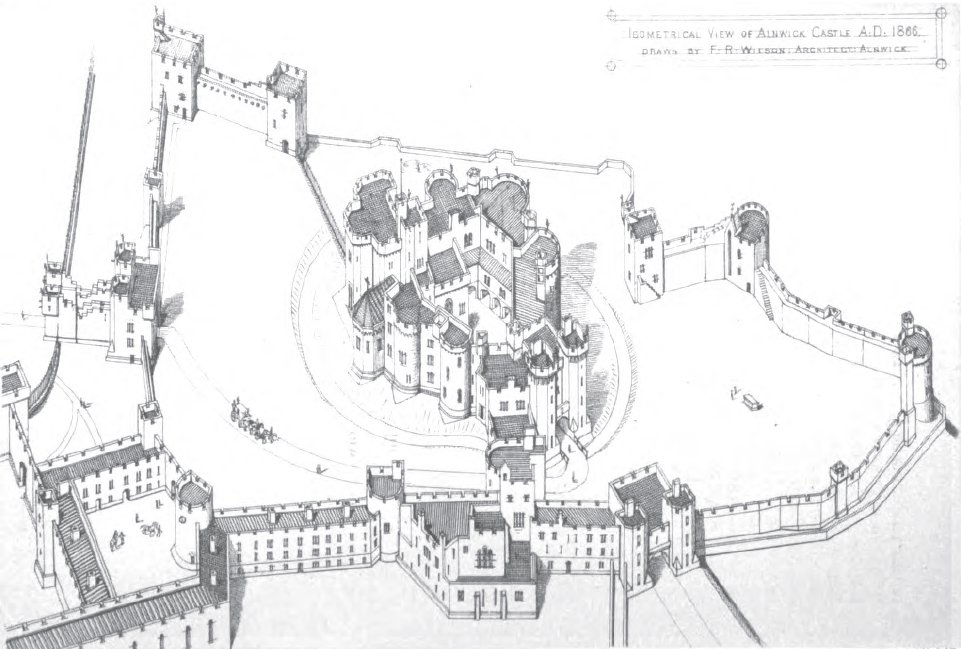
Isometric view of Alnwick Castle, 1866

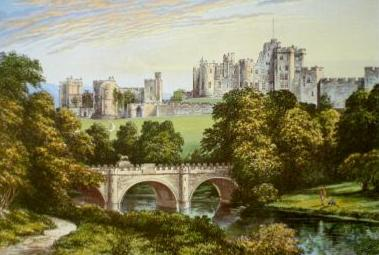
Alnwick Castle, chromolithograph by Alexander Francis Lydon, 1870

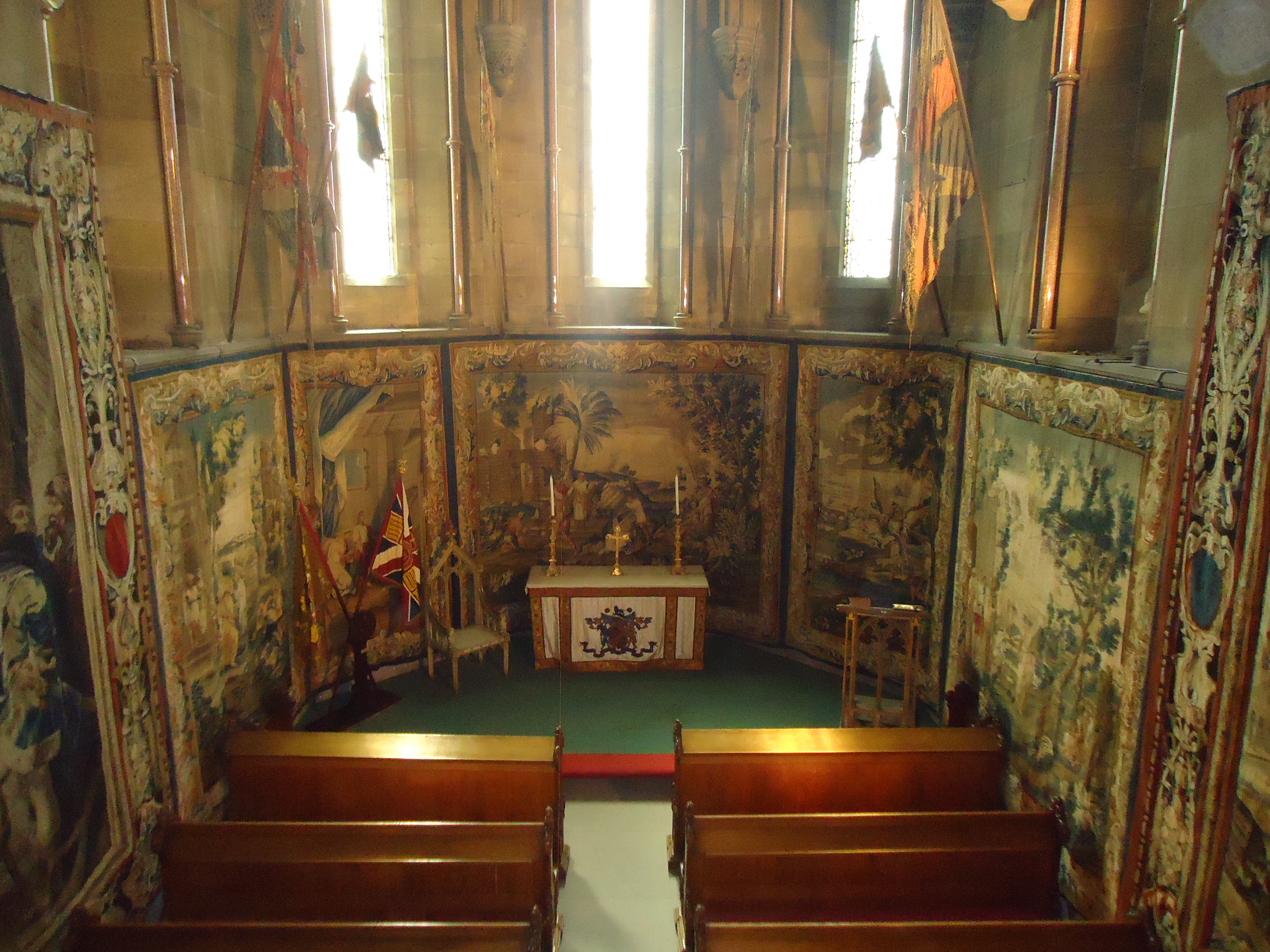
Alnwick Castle, the altar in the castle Chapel

Alnwick Castle guards a road crossing the River Aln. Ivo de Vesci, Baron of Alnwick, a nobleman from Vassy, Calvados in Normandy, erected the first parts of the castle in about 1096. Beatrix de Vesci, the daughter of Yves de Vescy, married the Constable of Chestershire and Knaresborough, Eustace fitz John. By his marriage to Beatrix de Vesci, he gained the baronies of Malton and Alnwick. The castle was first mentioned in 1136 when it was captured by King David I of Scotland. At this point, it was described as "very strong". It was rebuilt in stone in 1157.It was besieged in 1172 and again in 1174 by William the Lion, King of Scotland. William was captured outside the walls during the Battle of Alnwick. Eustace de Vesci, lord of Alnwick, was accused of plotting with Robert Fitzwalter against King John in 1212. In response, John ordered the demolition of Alnwick Castle and of Fitzwalter's stronghold, Baynard's Castle, though his instructions were not carried out at Alnwick.

A descendant of Ivo de Vesci, John de Vesci, succeeded to his father's titles and estates upon the latter's death in Gascony in 1253. These included the barony of Alnwick and a large property in Northumberland and considerable estates in Yorkshire, including Malton. As John was underage, King Henry III of England conferred the wardship of his estates to a foreign relative, which caused great offence to the de Vesci family. The family's property and estates had been put into the guardianship of Antony Bek, who sold them to the Percy family in 1307. From this time, the fortunes of the Percys, though they still held their Yorkshire lands and titles, were linked permanently with Alnwick and its castle and have been owned by the Percy family, the earls and later dukes of Northumberland since. The stone castle Henry Percy bought was a modest affair, but he immediately began rebuilding. Though he did not live to see its completion, the construction programme turned Alnwick into a major fortress along the Anglo-Scottish border. His son, also called Henry (1299–1352), continued the building. The Abbot's Tower, the Middle Gateway, and the Constable's Tower survive from this period. The work at Alnwick Castle balanced military requirements with the family's residential needs. It set the template for castle renovations in the 14th century in northern England; several palace-fortresses, considered "extensive, opulent [and] theatrical" date from this period in the region, such as the castles of Bamburgh and Raby. In 1345 the Percys acquired Warkworth Castle, also in Northumberland. Though Alnwick was considered more prestigious, Warkworth became the family's preferred residence.

The Percy family was a powerful lord in northern England. Henry Percy, 1st Earl of Northumberland (1341–1408), rebelled against King Richard II and helped dethrone him. The earl and his son Harry Hotspur later rebelled against King Henry IV and, after defeating Hotspur in the Battle of Shrewsbury, the king pursued the earl. The castle surrendered under the threat of bombardment in 1403.

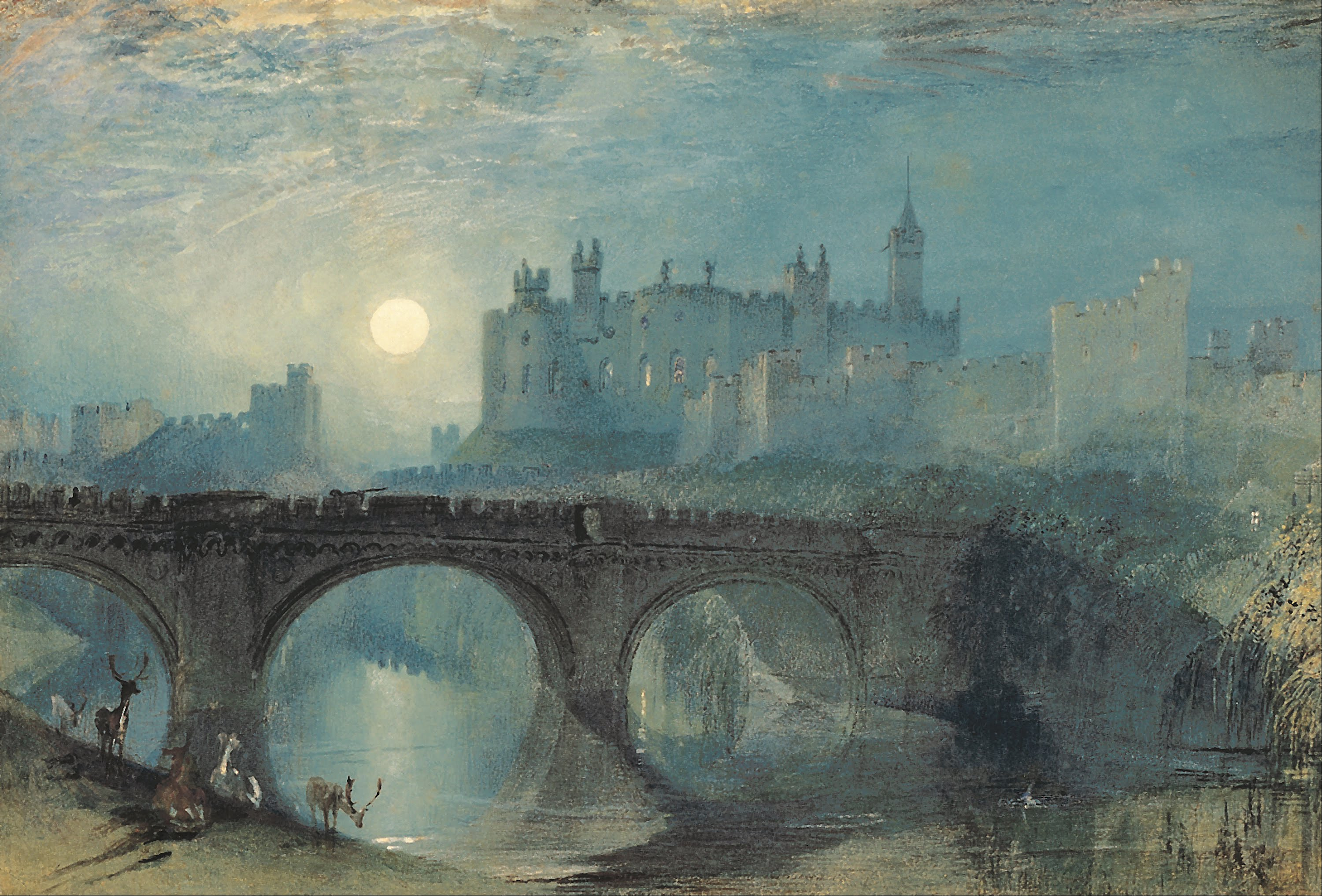
Alnwick Castle, by J. M. W. Turner

During the Wars of the Roses, castles were infrequently attacked, and conflict was generally based around combat in the field. Alnwick was one of three castles held by Lancastrian forces in 1461 and 1462, and it was there that the "only practical defence of a private castle" was made according to military historian D. J. Cathcart King. It was held against King Edward IV until its surrender in mid-September 1461 after the Battle of Towton. Re-captured by the Lancastrian Sir William Tailboys, during the winter it was surrendered by him to Hastings, Sir John Howard and Sir Ralph Grey of Heton in late July 1462. Grey was appointed captain but surrendered to the Lancastrians after a sharp siege in the early autumn. King Edward responded with vigour, and when the Earl of Warwick arrived in November Queen Margaret and her French advisor, Pierre de Brézé, were forced to sail to Scotland for help. They organised a mainly Scots relief force which, under George Douglas, 4th Earl of Angus and de Brézé, set out on 22 November. Warwick's army, commanded by the experienced Earl of Kent and the recently pardoned Lord Scales, prevented news from getting through to the starving garrisons. As a result, the nearby Bamburgh and Dunstanburgh castles soon agreed terms. They surrendered, but Hungerford and Whittingham held Alnwick until Warwick was forced to withdraw when de Brézé and Angus arrived on 5 January 1463.

The Lancastrians missed a chance to bring Warwick to battle, instead being content to retire, leaving behind only a token force which surrendered to the Yorkists the next day. By May 1463, Alnwick was in Lancastrian hands for the third time since Towton, betrayed by Grey of Heton, who tricked the commander, Sir John Astley. Astley was imprisoned, and Hungerford resumed command. After Montagu's triumphs at Hedgeley Moor and Hexham in 1464, Warwick arrived before Alnwick on 23 June and received its surrender the next day, bringing it finally into Yorkist hands. By the following decade, the 4th Earl of Northumberland had pledged fealty to Edward IV, and the castle was returned to the Percys.

After the execution of Thomas Percy, 7th Earl of Northumberland in 1572, Alnwick Castle was increasingly uninhabited. The 9th Earl of Northumberland placed his distant cousin, another Thomas, in charge as constable in 1594. Still, just over a decade later, Thomas was killed fleeing the Gunpowder Plot and the earl was imprisoned in the Tower of London, beginning over a century without a significant Percy presence at Alnwick. In 1650, Oliver Cromwell would use the castle to house prisoners following the Battle of Dunbar.

In the second half of the 18th century, Robert Adam carried out many alterations, as did James Paine, Daniel Garrett, and Capability Brown, all under the orders of the returning Percy family. Elizabeth Seymour and Hugh Smithson were elevated to 1st Duke and Duchess of Northumberland in 1766 by George III, whose restorations at Windsor Castle were partly inspired by the couple's work at Alnwick. The interiors were largely in a Strawberry Hill gothic style, not at all typical of Adam's work, which was usually neoclassical, as seen at the Northumberlands' London home, Syon House.

However, in the 19th century Algernon, 4th Duke of Northumberland replaced much of Adam's architecture. Instead, he paid Anthony Salvin £250,000 between 1854 and 1865 to remove the recent additions and remodel the castle in a more convincingly medieval style. Salvin is mostly responsible for the kitchen, the Prudhoe Tower, the palatial accommodation, and the layout of the inner ward. Some of Adam's work survives. Still, little of it remains in the principal rooms shown to the public, which were redecorated in an opulent Italianate style in the Victorian era by Luigi Canina.

== Current use ==
The barbican, main entrance to Alnwick Castle

The current duke and his family live in the castle, but occupy only a part of it. The castle is open to the public throughout the summer. After Windsor Castle, it is the second largest inhabited castle in England. Alnwick is the tenth-most-visited stately home in England according to the Historic Houses Association, with 195,504 visitors in 2006. This figure has increased significantly in the subsequent decade.

During World War II, the Newcastle Church High School for Girls was evacuated to Alnwick Castle. Since the war, parts of the castle have continued being used by two other educational establishments: from 1945 to 1977, as Alnwick College of Education, a teacher training college; and, since 1981, by St. Cloud State University of Minnesota as a branch campus forming part of their International Study Programme.

Special exhibitions are housed in three of the castle's perimeter towers. The Postern Tower, as well as featuring an exhibition on the Dukes of Northumberland and their interest in archaeology, includes frescoes from Pompeii, relics from Ancient Egypt and Romano-British objects. Constable's Tower houses military displays, including the Percy Tenantry Volunteers exhibition, which features local volunteer soldiers raised to repel Napoleon's planned invasion in the period 1798–1814. The Abbot's Tower houses the Regimental Museum of the Royal Northumberland Fusiliers.

An increase in public interest in the castle was generated by its use as a stand-in for the exterior and interior of Hogwarts in the Harry Potter films. Its appearance in the films has helped shape the public imagination regarding what castles should look like. Its condition contrasts with the vast majority of castles in the country, which are ruinous and unfit for habitation.

== Construction ==
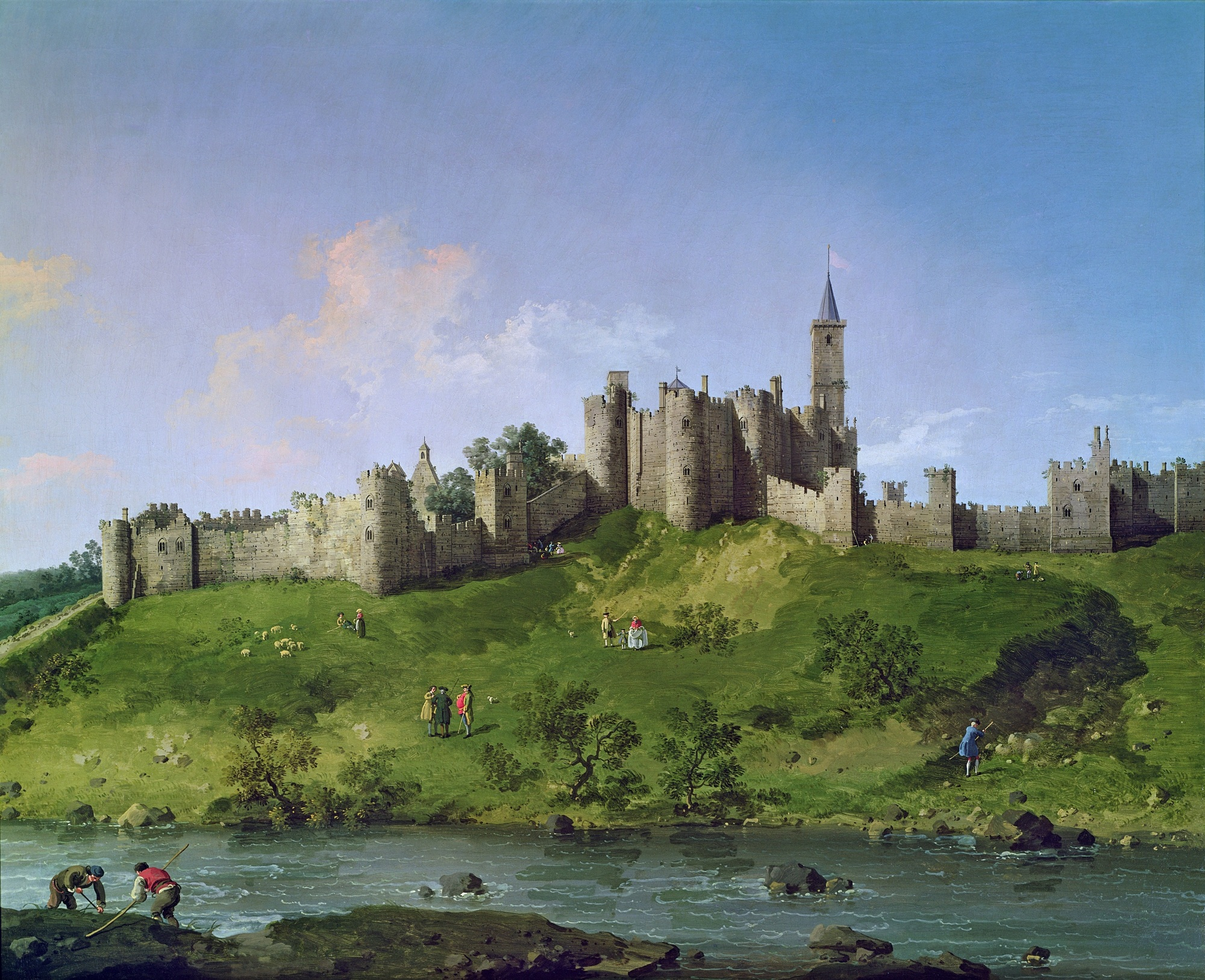
Alnwick Castle by Canaletto, c. 1750

The River Aln flows past the north side of the castle. There is a deep ravine to the south and east, separating the castle from the town. By the 12th century, Alnwick Castle had assumed the general layout which it retains today. It is distinguished as one of the earliest castles in England to be built without a square keep. The castle consists of two main rings of buildings. The principal rooms are in the much-rebuilt shell keep at the centre of the castle. The keep is entered through an elaborate Romanesque archway flanked by two semi-octagonal towers, added in the 14th century to defend the gate better. Unlike most shell keeps, which consist of a plain circular wall, Alnwick's is created by ten tightly-packed towers, thanks to its extensive later reconstruction. Of these towers, two flank the gate, three more are 14th century, and the remainder are the work of Salvin. Within the keep, the arches over the well and the gateway are medieval, while the rest is Salvin's. He added the large Prudhoe Tower with a loggia at the ground level in the north-west corner of the small courtyard inside the keep.

This structure is at the centre of a large bailey. As the central block was not large enough to contain all the accommodations required in later centuries, a large range of buildings was constructed along the south wall of the bailey. Link building connects these two main areas of accommodation. There are ten main towers along the walls of the outer bailey. Running clockwise from the keep, they are the Postern Tower, the Constable's Tower, the Record Tower, the Warder's Tower, the middle gatehouse, the Auditor's Tower, the Clock Tower, the main gatehouse, the Abbot's Tower, and the Falconer's Tower. Some of the towers are D-shaped for better resistance to assault, while others are rectangular for better accommodation. Most of the towers are part of the 14th-century work, though the Constable's, Warder's, Clock and Falconer's Towers have been rebuilt. There are also three smaller turrets: Hotspur's Chair on the east side, named after Harry Hotspur, and the West Garret and Aveners' Towers on either side of the main gatehouse. The main gate is defended by two semi-octagonal towers, like the inner gate, with a long barbican in front. About a sixth of the bailey wall has been reduced to almost ground level on the bailey side to open views into the park. Where the outer wall formerly joined the keep, a lower terrace was added as part of the Georgian works. Stable and service yards adjoin the castle outside the bailey; these would not have existed when the castle still had a military function.

The keep

Coat of arms on the facade of the keep

An outer courtyard

One of the towers, now hosting the Fusilliers Museum

The easternmost tower

Cannons exhibited on the Gun Terrace

The barbican and the keep in the background

Statues at the top of the barbican

Alnwick Castle has two parks. Immediately to the north of the castle is a relatively small park straddling the River Aln, which was landscaped by Lancelot Brown ("Capability Brown") and Thomas Call in the 18th century; it is known locally as the Pastures. Nearby is the much larger Hulne Park, which contains the remains of Hulne Priory.

The castle is in good repair and used for many purposes. It provides a home for the present Duke and family and offices for Northumberland Estates, which manages the Duke's extensive farming and property holdings.

Carved figures surmount Alnwick's battlements. Some of these date from around 1300; historian Matthew Johnson notes that around this time there were several castles in northern England similarly decorated, such as Bothal, Lumley, and Raby. However, many of the surviving figures are from the mid-18th century, commissioned by the 1st Duke and Duchess from Stamfordham sculptor James Johnson.

== Alnwick Garden ==
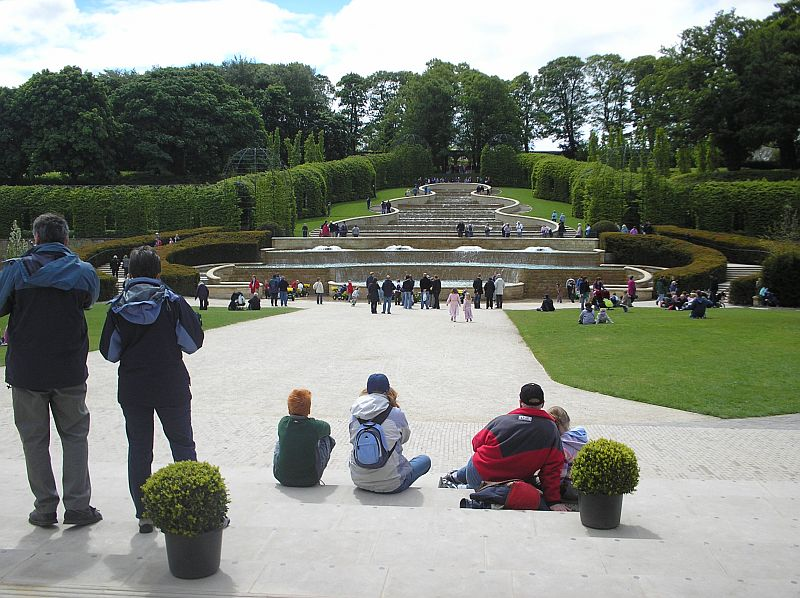
The cascade fountain in the Alnwick Garden

Adjacent to the castle, Jane Percy, Duchess of Northumberland, initiated the establishment of the Alnwick Garden, a formal garden set around a cascading fountain. It cost £42 million (press release, 7 August 2003). The garden belongs to a charitable trust which is separate from the Northumberland Estates, but the Duke of Northumberland donated the 42-acre (17 ha) site and £9 million. The garden is designed by Jacques Wirtz and Peter Wirtz of Wirtz International, based in Schoten, Belgium. The first phase of development, which opened in October 2001, included creating the fountain and planting the gardens. In 2004, a large 6,000-square-foot (560 m^{2}) 'treehouse' complex, including a café, was opened. It is deemed one of the largest treehouses in the world.

In February 2005, a poison garden, growing plants such as cannabis and opium poppy, was added. In May 2006, a pavilion and visitor centre designed by Sir Michael Hopkins and Buro Happold opened, seating up to 1,000 people.

== Filming location ==
Alnwick Castle has frequently been used for filming. Films shot at the castle include: Prince Valiant (1954); Becket (1964); Mary, Queen of Scots (1971); Ivanhoe (1982); Robin Hood: Prince of Thieves (1991); Elizabeth (1998); Harry Potter and the Philosopher's Stone (2001); Harry Potter and the Chamber of Secrets (2002); Your Highness (2011); Transformers: The Last Knight (2017) and Dungeons & Dragons: Honour Among Thieves (2023). Television programmes shot at the castle include: Count Dracula (1977): The Black Adder (1983); Robin of Sherwood (1984–86); Star Trek The Next Generation (1991); Antiques Roadshow (1995); The Virgin Queen (2005); The Hollow Crown (2012) and Downton Abbey (2015–16).

== See also ==
- Castles in Great Britain and Ireland
- List of castles in England

== Sources ==
- Allen Brown, Reginald (April 1959), "A List of Castles, 1154–1216", The English Historical Review, 74 (291), Oxford University Press: 249–280, doi:10.1093/ehr/lxxiv.291.249, JSTOR 558442
- Allsopp, Bruce; Clark, Ursula (1969). Historic Architecture of Northumberland. Newcastle upon Tyne: Oriel Press. ISBN 0 85362 062 8.
- Cathcart King, David James (1983), Castellarium Anglicanum: An Index and Bibliography of the Castles in England, Wales and the Islands. Volume II: Norfolk–Yorkshire and the Islands, London: Kraus International Publications, ISBN 0-527-50110-7
- Cathcart King, David James (1988), The Castle in England and Wales: an Interpretative History, London: Croom Helm, ISBN 0-918400-08-2
- Cockayne's Complete Peerage, (Vescy), Vol. XIIB, pp. 272–274
- Emery, Anthony (1996), Greater Medieval Houses of England and Wales, 1300–1500, Volume I: Northern England, Cambridge University Press, ISBN 978-0-521-49723-7
- Fry, Plantagenet Somerset (2005) [1980], Castles, Newton Abbot: David & Charles, ISBN 0-7153-7976-3
- Goodall, John (2006), Warkworth Castle and Hermitage, London: English Heritage, ISBN 978-1-85074-923-3
- Grundy, John (2022). History of Northumberland. Newcastle upon Tyne: Tyne Bridge Publishing. ISBN 9781838280970.
- Hull, Lisa (2008), Understanding the Castle Ruins of England and Wales: How to Interpret the History and Meaning of Masonry and Earthworks, McFarland & Co, ISBN 978-0-7864-3457-2
- Johnson, Matthew (2002), Behind the Castle Gate: From Medieval to Renaissance, London: Routledge, ISBN 0-415-25887-1
- Mackworth-Young, Robin (1992), The History and Treasures of Windsor Castle, Andover: Pitkin, ISBN 0-85372-338-9
- Pettifer, Adrian (1995), English Castles: A Guide by County, Woodbridge: The Boydell Press, ISBN 0-85115-782-3
- Robinson, John Martin (2001), Windsor Castle: The Official Illustrated History, London: Royal Collection Publications, ISBN 978-1-902163-21-5
- Turner, Ralph V. (2004). "Vescy (Vesci), Eustace de (1169/70–1216)". Oxford Dictionary of National Biography. Oxford Dictionary of National Biography (online ed.). Oxford: Oxford University Press. doi:10.1093/ref:odnb/28253. (Subscription, Wikipedia Library access or UK public library membership required.)
