= River Aln =

River in Northumberland, England

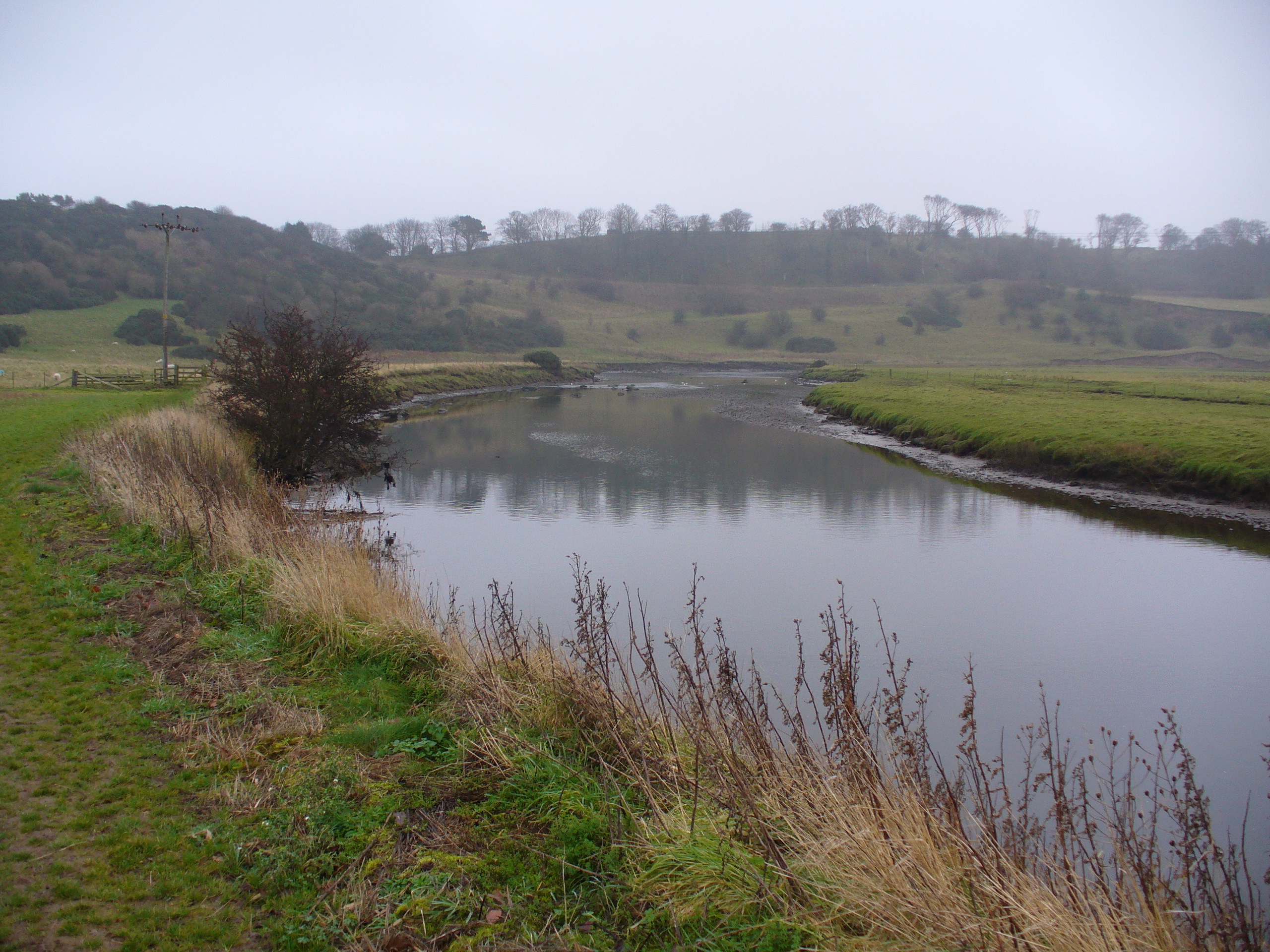
- The River Aln near Alnmouth

- Location within Northumberland

Location
- Country: United Kingdom
- County: Northumberland
- Towns: Alnham, Whittingham, Alnwick, Lesbury, Alnmouth

Physical characteristics
- Source
  - location: Alnham
  - coordinates: 55.392°N 2.007°W
- Mouth
  - location: Alnmouth
  - coordinates: 55.3848°N 1.6120°W
- Length: 40 kilometres (25 mi)

The River Aln (/ˈæl(ə)n/) runs through the county of Northumberland in England. It rises in Alnham in the Cheviot Hills and discharges into the North Sea at Alnmouth on the east coast of England.

The river gives its name to the town of Alnwick and the villages of Alnmouth and Alnham. For part of its route, directly upstream of Alnwick, the river flows through Hulne Park.

== Etymology ==
The meaning of the name Aln is uncertain, but it is generally seen as a river-name of the Alaunos or Alaunā. Names of this type could derive from the Celtic root *al- ('feed, raise, nurture') or *alǝ- (to wander'), or else from the Brittonic element *al-, "shining, bright" (Welsh alaw, 'waterlilly'). Another suggestion is that the name is derived from the Brittonic root *Alaun- (‘holy one’ or ‘mighty one’).

== History ==
The Aln is first mentioned in the Geography of Ptolemy, a 2nd Century AD Roman cartographer. He refers to it as the River Alaunos or Alaunus (Geographica 2.3.4.18), on which seems to be situated the town of Alauna (Geographica 2.3.7.6). This can speculatively be identified as the Roman fort at Learchild, where the Devil's Causeway crosses the river.

The Aln is a relatively small river but has been important through history as one of the boundaries along which English and Scottish troops marching to war had to cross; for that reason, it was at times heavily defended. For example, the river flows past Learchild Roman Fort and, more significantly, Alnwick Castle which was built for this purpose.

In two battles at Alnwick the river was a significant element: the first in 1093 between Malcolm III of Scotland and Robert de Mowbray; the second in 1174 between William I of Scotland and Ranulf de Glanville.

Adtwifyrdi is the name used by the Venerable Bede to describe the meeting of river and tributary at the mouth of the River Aln.

== Non-tidal ecology ==
The river has a good run of sea trout and salmon, as well as a population of resident brown trout. Public fishing is controlled by the Aln Anglers' Association. The Aln also has a resident population of otters. Grey heron, barn owls, kestrels and buzzards can be observed hunting along the banks of the river.

== Tidal ecology ==
Part of the estuary is designated a Site of Special Scientific Interest, and the river below Lesbury footbridge (the normal tidal limit, except on high springs and in surge events) was made a marine conservation zone in 2013. Large groups of lapwings, oystercatchers and curlews can often be seen. In smaller numbers are mallards, shelducks, grey herons, cormorants, greylag geese, Canada geese, mute swans and the occasional family of goosanders. Less often spotted are barn owls, kestrels, avocets and little egrets. Further down the tidal zone a visitor will often see Sandwich terns and common terns, as well as a variety of gulls and smaller waders including redshanks, greenshanks, turnstones, ringed plovers, pied wagtails, and other sandpipers.

== See also ==
- Rivers of the United Kingdom
