= William de Vesci =

High Sheriff of Northumberland

- Noble family: de Burgo de Vesci
- Father: Eustace fitz John
- Mother: Beatrix de Vesci

William de Vesci (c.1125–1184) was an Anglo-Norman feudal lord and Sheriff. Born William fitz Eustace at Knaresborough Castle, Yorkshire, the son of Eustace Fitz John and Beatrix de Vesci, he took his mother's surname.

He was appointed Sheriff of Northumberland from 1155 to 1170 and then Sheriff of Lancashire from 1166 to 1170.

In 1174, he joined other knights such as Bernard de Balliol and Robert III de Stuteville under the command of Ranulf de Glanville, Sheriff of Westmorland to attack an invading Scottish army then besieging Alnwick castle in Northumberland. The Scottish king William I of Scotland (William the Lion) was captured and the invasion successfully repelled.

== Marriage and issue ==
He married Burga de Stuteville, daughter of Robert III de Stuteville, they had the following known issue:

- Maud, married Thomas de Muschamp and also Adam de Karliolo
- Eustace, died 1216. He married Margaret, illegitimate daughter of William the Lion, King of Scotland.
- Richard of Chimley
- Warin of Knapton, married Matilda de Wellon, had issue.
- Cecily

He also allegedly fathered an illegitimate daughter Sibil, who married Walter de Bolbec.
