= Bolton, Northumberland =

Village in Northumberland, England

Coordinates: 55.4168°N 1.8336°W

Bolton
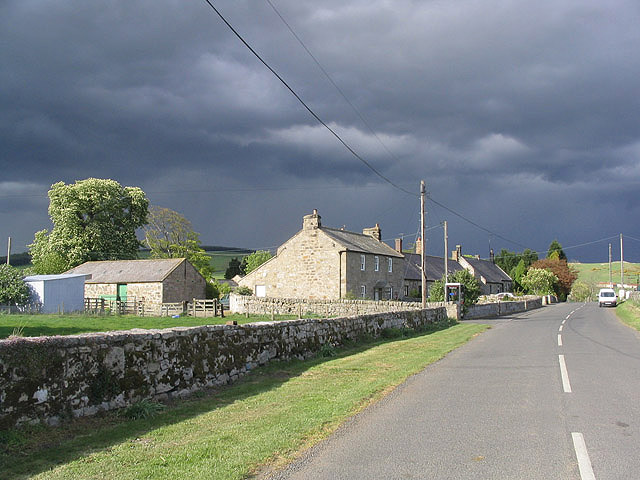
- Bolton

- Location within Northumberland
- OS grid reference: NU105135
- Civil parish: Hedgeley
- Unitary authority: Northumberland
- Ceremonial county: Northumberland
- Region: North East
- Country: England
- Sovereign state: United Kingdom
- Post town: ALNWICK
- Postcode district: NE66
- Dialling code: 01665
- Police: Northumbria
- Fire: Northumberland
- Ambulance: North East
- UK Parliament: North Northumberland

Bolton is a village in the civil parish of Hedgeley, in the county of Northumberland, England. It is situated on the north side of the River Aln, about two miles (3 km) east by north from Whittingham, and 5 1/2 miles west from Alnwick. It has a chapel and a small number of residential properties.

== History ==
Bolton is an ancient Northumbrian village. An early record is of the establishment of a hospital, founded by Robert de Ros, Baron of Wark, before the year 1225, to support a master and three chaplains, thirteen leprous men, and other lay-brethren, dedicated to St. Thomas the Martyr, or the Holy Trinity; subordinate to the abbey of Ryeval, and the priory of Kirkham, in Yorkshire.

de Ros richly endowed the hospital with the villa, lordship, impropriation, and advowson of Bolton, and a waste of 140 acres (0.57 km^{2}); a corn-mill and a tenement at Mindrum; lands at Paston, and at Kilham. He also gave it the villa, manor, impropriation, and advowson of Straunston, and his estates of the Pauntons within that lordship, near Grantham, in Lincolnshire; and also an estate at Elwell, in Swanesland, in Yorkshire, with pasturage for 300 sheep, near the river Humber; a corn-mill and a tenement at Middleton, near Dalton; and lands at Garton; both in the county of York.

The master, chaplains, and brethren of the hospital, were to keep a good table, dress neatly, and provide themselves with proper necessaries and conveniences out of their annual revenues, and apply the remainder to the relief of the poor, and helpless strangers. At the Dissolution of the Monasteries between 1536 and 1541, it came, with the manor and villa, into the possession of the Collingwoods of Eslington. It belonged to Sir Cuthbert Collingwood; and to Robert Collingwood.

By 1702, it was the seat and manor of William Brown, High Sheriff of Northumberland in that year; and of Nicholas Brown, high sheriff of Northumberland, 1748; and afterwards of his son-in-law, Matthew Forster a younger branch of the house of Etherstone, and who was high sheriff of Northumberland in 1765. Bolton came next into the possession of the co-heiress of his late widow, Mrs. Forster, daughter of Nicholas Brown, Esq. above-mentioned.

Before the battle of Flodden, Sir Thomas Howard, Earl of Surrey, was at this village, on Monday, 5 September 1513; where all the noblemen and gentlemen met him with their retinues, to the number of 26,000 men, among whom were Lords Clifford, Coniers, Ogle, Scroope, and Lumley, Sir William Percy, Lionel Percy, Sir George Darcy, Sir William Bulmer, of Brancepeth Castle, in the county of Durham, and Richard Tempest.

The population of the 'township' of Bolton is given in an 1827/8 gazetteer as 115 in 1801; 130 in 1811; and 144 people in 1821, divided into 27 families living in 27 houses. The annual value of the township is specified as £1,707. Bolton was formerly a township in the parish of Edlingham, in 1866 Bolton became a civil parish, on 1 April 1955 the parish was abolished and merged with Hedgeley. In 1951 the civil parish had a population of 79.

== Governance ==
Bolton is in the parliamentary constituency of Berwick-upon-Tweed.

== See also ==
- Bewick and Beanley Moors SSSI.
- Jenny's Lantern

== Notes ==
- This article incorporates text from An historical, topographical, and descriptive view of the county of Northumberland, Volume II, 1825, a publication now in the public domain.
