= Agatha (wife of Edward the Exile) =

Wife of Edward the Exile

- Born: before 1030
- Died: after 1070; England
- Spouse: Edward the Exile
- Issue: Edgar Ætheling; Margaret; Cristina

Agatha (before 1030 – after 1070) was married to Edward the Exile, a candidate for the throne of England, and mother of Edgar Ætheling, Saint Margaret of Scotland and Cristina. Her antecedents are unclear and the subject of much speculation.

== Life ==
Nothing is known of Agatha's early life, and what speculation has appeared is inextricably linked to the contentious issue of Agatha's paternity, one of the unresolved questions of medieval genealogy. As the birth of her children is speculatively placed at around the year 1045, her own birth was probably before about 1030. She came to England with her husband and children in 1057, but was widowed shortly after her arrival. Following the Norman Conquest, in 1067 she fled with her children to Scotland, finding refuge under her future son-in-law Malcolm III. Simeon of Durham carries what appears to be the last reference to her in 1070.

== Origin ==
=== Medieval sources ===
Agatha's origin is alluded to in numerous surviving medieval sources, but the information they provide is sometimes imprecise, often contradictory, and occasionally demonstrably false. The earliest-surviving source, the Anglo-Saxon Chronicle, along with John of Worcester's Chronicon ex chronicis and its associated genealogical tables (sometimes named separately as Regalis prosapia Anglorum), Symeon of Durham (thaes ceseres maga) and Ailred of Rievaulx describe Agatha as a kinswoman of "Emperor Henry", the latter explicitly making her daughter of his brother (filia germani imperatoris Henrici). It is not clear whether the "Henry" mentioned was Henry II or Henry III, although Regalis prosapia Anglorum specifies Henry III.

Later sources of dubious credibility such as the Chronicle of Melrose call her daughter of Henry, while Matthew of Paris calls her the emperor's sister (soror Henrici imperatoris Romani). Geoffrey Gaimar in Lestoire des Engles states that she was daughter of the Hungarian king and queen (Li reis sa fille), although he places the marriage at a time when Edward is thought still to have been in Kiev, while Orderic Vitalis in Historiae Ecclesiasticae is more specific, naming her father as king Solomon (filiam Salomonis Regis Hunorum), even though he was actually a contemporary of Agatha's children. William of Malmesbury in De Gestis Regis Anglorum states that Agatha's sister was a Queen of Hungary (reginae sororem) and is echoed in this by Alberic of Trois-Fontaines, while, less precisely, Ailred says of Margaret that she was derived from English and Hungarian royal blood (de semine regio Anglorum et Hungariorum extitit oriunda).

Finally, Roger of Howden and the anonymous Leges Edwardi Confessoris indicate that while Edward was a guest of Kievan "king Malesclodus" he married a woman of noble birth (nobili progenio), Leges adding that the mother of St Margaret was of Rus royal blood (ex genere et sanguine regum Rugorum).

=== Onomastics ===
Onomastic analysis has also been brought to bear on the question. The name Agatha itself is rare in western Europe at this time. Likewise, those of her children and grandchildren are either drawn from the pool of Anglo-Saxon names to be expected given her husband's membership of the royal family of Wessex, or else are names not typical of western Europe. There is speculation that the latter derive from Agatha's eastern European ancestry. Specifically, her own name, the names of her daughters Cristina and Margaret, and those of her grandchildren Alexander, David and Mary, have been used as possible indicators of her origins.

Edward the Exile	Agatha
Edgar; Ætheling	Cristina	Margaret	Malcolm III of Scotland
Edward	Edmund	Ethelred	Edgar	Alexander	David	Edith	Mary

=== Danish theory ===
Among the earliest theories put forward was by Elias Reusner, writing in 1592, arguing that Agatha was either the daughter or granddaughter of the English and Danish king Cnut. This theory was reiterated in 1634 by Johann Adolf Cypraeus. The evidence to support this theory hinges on the definition of Agatha being the kinswoman of Emperor Henry III through marriage instead of blood; as Henry's first wife was Cnut's daughter Gunhilda, this would make Agatha Henry's niece, if she were the daughter of Harthacnut. This theory has been largely ignored since the 18th century in favour of other possible reconstructions.

=== German and Hungarian theories ===
While various sources repeat the claims that Agatha was daughter or sister of either Emperor Henry, it seems unlikely that such a sibling or daughter would have been ignored by the German chroniclers.

The description of Agatha as a blood relative of "Emperor Henry" may be applicable to a niece of either Henry II or Henry III, emperors of the Holy Roman Empire (although John of Worcester in Regalis prosapia Anglorum specifies Henry III). Early attempts at reconstructing the relationship focused on the former. Georgio Pray (1764, Annales Regum Hungariae), P.F. Suhm (1777, Geschichte Dänmarks, Norwegen und Holsteins) and Istvan Katona (1779, Historia Critica Regum Hungariae) each suggested that Agatha was the daughter of Henry II's brother Bruno of Augsburg (an ecclesiastic described as beatae memoriae, with no known issue), while Daniel Cornides (1778, Regum Hungariae) tried to harmonise the German and Hungarian claims, making Agatha daughter of Henry II's sister Giselle of Bavaria, wife of Stephen I of Hungary. This solution remained popular among scholars into the second half of the twentieth century.

Henry II; Duke of Bavaria
Henry II; Emperor	Bruno of Augsburg

Gisela of Burgundy
Giselle of Bavaria	St. Stephen of Hungary
St. Emeric

As tempting as it may be to thus view St. Margaret as a granddaughter of another famous saint, Stephen of Hungary, this popular solution fails to explain why Stephen's death triggered a dynastic crisis in Hungary, or at least that Agatha's family failed to play a role in that strife. If St. Stephen and Giselle were indeed Agatha's parents, her offspring would have had a strong claim to the Hungarian crown. Actually, there is no indication in Hungarian sources that any of Stephen's children outlived him. Likewise, all of the solutions involving Henry II would seem to make Agatha much older than her husband, and prohibitively old at the time of the birth of her last child, Edgar.

Based on a more strict translation of the Latin description used by John of Worcester and others as well as the supposition that Henry III was the Emperor designated in the Anglo-Saxon Chronicle, genealogist Szabolcs de Vajay popularised another idea first suggested in 1939. In that year, Jozsef Herzog published an analysis suggesting that Agatha was daughter of one of Henry's half-brothers, born to his mother Gisela of Swabia by her earlier marriages to Ernest I of Swabia and Bruno of Brunswick, probably the former based on more favourable chronology. De Vajay reevaluated the chronology of the marriages and children of Gisela and concluded that Agatha was the daughter of Henry III's elder (uterine) half-brother, Liudolf, Margrave of Frisia. This theory saw broad acceptance for several decades until René Jetté resurrected a Kievan solution to the problem, since which time opinion has been divided among several competing possibilities.

Ernest I of Swabia
Ernest II of Swabia

Gisela of Swabia
Bruno of Brunswick	Conrad II; Emperor
Herman IV of Swabia	Liudolf of Frisia	Henry III; Emperor
Judith of Swabia	Solomon of Hungary

=== Kievan theory ===
Jetté pointed out that William of Malmesbury in De Gestis Regis Anglorum and several later chronicles unambiguously state that Agatha's sister was a Queen of Hungary. From what is known about the biography of Edward the Exile, he apparently was in the political faction of Andrew I of Hungary, following him from Kiev to Hungary in 1046 and staying at his court for many years. Andrew's wife and queen was Anastasia, a daughter of Yaroslav the Wise of Kiev by Ingigerd of Sweden. Following Jetté's logic, Edward's wife was another daughter of Yaroslav. In so doing, he mirrored a solution to Agatha's paternity put forward in 1894 by William Ferrand Felch.

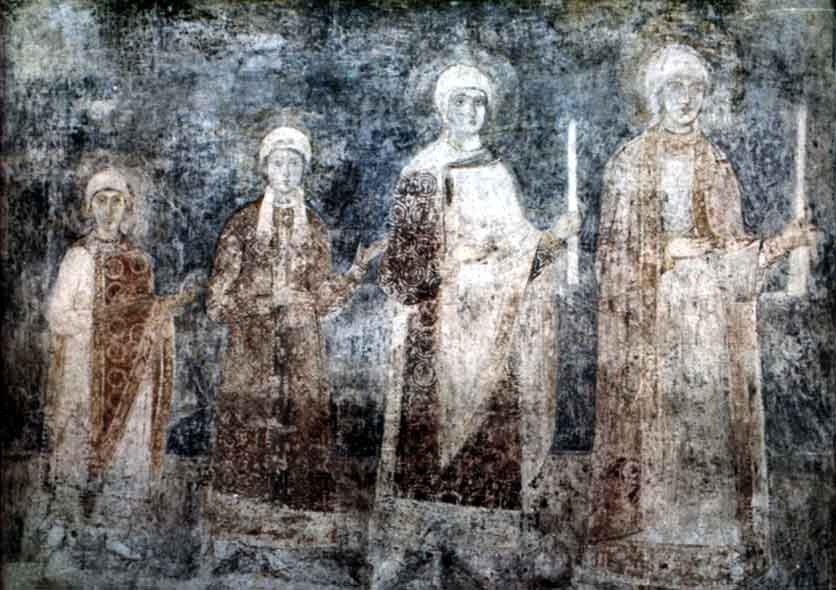
11th-century fresco representing the daughters of Yaroslav I

This Felch/Jetté theory accords with the seemingly incongruous statements of Geoffrey Gaimar and Roger of Howden that, while living in Kiev, Edward took a native-born wife "of noble parentage" or that his father-in-law was a "Rus king".

Eduard Hlawitschka also identifies Agatha as a daughter of Yaroslav, pointing out that Adam of Bremen, who was well informed on North-European affairs, noted around 1074 that Edward was exiled in Kievan Rus (E[d]mund, vir bellicosus, in gratiam victoris sublatus est; filii eius in Ruzziam exilio dampnati) and that the author of Leges Edwardi confessoris, who had strong ties with Agatha's children, Queen Margaret of Scotland and her sister Cristina, and could thus reasonably be expected to be aware of their descent, recorded around 1120 that Edward went to the land of the Rus and that there he married a noblewoman.

Onomastics have been seen as supporting the Kievan theory. Among medieval royalty, Agatha's rare Greek name is first recorded in the Macedonian dynasty of Byzantium; it was also one of the most frequent feminine names in the Kievan Rurikid dynasty. After Anna of Byzantium married Yaroslav's father, he took the Christian name of the reigning emperor, Basil II, while some members of his family were named after other members of the imperial dynasty. Agatha could have been one of these.

The names of Agatha's immediate descendants — Margaret, Cristina, David and Alexander — likewise extraordinary for Britain at that time, have also been suggested as clues. The names Margaret and Cristina are today associated with Sweden, the native country of Yaroslav's wife Ingigerd. The name of Margaret's son, David, mirrors that of David of Hungary, like his elder brother Solomon a son of Andrew I of Hungary and Anastasia of Kiev. Furthermore, the first saint of the Rus (canonized ca. 1073) was Yaroslav's brother Gleb, whose Christian name was David.

Alexander	Leo VI	Romanos I
Constantine VII	Helena; Lekapene	Agatha
Romanos II	Agatha
St. Vladimir	Anna; Porphyrogeneta
St. Boris "Roman"	St. Gleb "David"	Yaroslav I	Ingigerd of Sweden (perhaps born Margaret)
Harald III of Norway	Elizabeth	Andrew I of Hungary	Anastasia	Anna	Henry I of France	Vsevolod I	Anastasia; Monomacha
Adelaide	Solomon of Hungary	David	Maria

The name of Margaret's other son, Alexander, may point to a variety of traditions, both occidental and oriental: the biography of Alexander the Great was one of the most popular books in eleventh-century Kiev, and it was a common name in the Greek-influenced Orthodox tradition. Humphreys would review the two main types of hypotheses, which he called the Salian and the Slavic theories, and pointed out that the critical evidence in weighing them is whether one accepts the testimony of John of Worcester (Salian) or William of Malmesbury (Slavic) as representing the earliest, most accurate version of her ancestry. He would later point out the occurrence of the name Maria in the next generation of the Kievan dynasty, and suggested that Agatha could instead have been sister of the Byzantine wife of Vsevolod I of Kiev, that the tradition of imperial connections had confused which Empire was involved. However, he subsequently studied the sources and particularly the chronology of this dynasty in more detail and concluded that this solution was unlikely, though he did favor a reconstruction making Yaroslav the son, rather than the step-son, of the Byzantine princess Anna Porphyrogeneta.

One inference from the Kievan theory is that Edgar Ætheling and St. Margaret would have been, through their mother, first cousins of Philip I of France. The connection seems too notable to be omitted from contemporary sources, yet there is no indication that medieval chroniclers were aware of it. An argumentum ex silentio regarding this relationship has been a factor leading critics of the Kievan theory to search for alternative explanations.

=== Bulgarian theory ===
In response to the recent flurry of activity on the subject, Ian Mladjov reevaluated the question and presented an alternative Bulgarian origin for Agatha. He dismissed each of the prior theories in turn as insufficiently grounded and incompatible given the historical record, and further argued that many of the proposed solutions would have meant that later documented marriages would have fallen within the prohibited degree of kinship, yet there is no record the issue of consanguinity was ever raised with regard to these marriages. He argued that the documentary testimony of Agatha's origins is tainted or late, and concurred with Humphreys' evaluation that the names of the children and grandchildren of Agatha, so central to prior reevaluations, may have had non-family origins (for example, Pope Alexander II, having played a critical role in the marriage of Malcolm and Margaret, may have inspired their use of that name). However, he then focused in on the name of Agatha as being critical to determining her origin. He concluded that of the few contemporaries named Agatha, only Agatha Chryselia, married to Samuel of Bulgaria could possibly have been an ancestor of Edward the Exile's spouse. Some of the other names associated with Agatha and used to corroborate theories based in onomastics were present within the Bulgarian ruling family at the time, including Mary and several Davids. Mladjov initially inferred that Agatha was granddaughter of Agatha Cryselia, daughter of Gavril Radomir, Tsar of Bulgaria by his short-lived first marriage to a Hungarian princess thought to have been the daughter of Duke Géza of Hungary. This hypothesis had Agatha born in Hungary after her parents divorced, her mother being pregnant when she left Bulgaria, yet would entail her mother naming her after the mother of the Bulgarian prince who had just rejected her. Traditional dates of this divorce would seem to preclude the suggested relationship, but the article re-examined some long-standing assumptions about the chronology of Gavril Radomir's marriage to the Hungarian princess, and concludes that its dating to the late 980s is unsupportable, and that its dissolution belongs in c. 1009–1014. The argument was based almost exclusively on the onomastic precedent but is said to vindicate the intimate connection between Agatha and Hungary attested in the Medieval sources. Mladjov speculated further that the medieval testimony could largely be harmonized were one to posit that Agatha's mother was the same Hungarian princess who married Samuel Aba of Hungary, his family fleeing to Kiev after his downfall, thereby allowing a Russian marriage for Agatha. He subsequently revised his hypothesis, suggesting that Agatha was instead daughter of Hungarian king Samuel Aba, whom he in turn hypothesized was son of Gavril and his Hungarian wife. This would conflict with the Gesta Hungarorum, which derives Samuel Aba from two Cuman chiefs.

Comita; Nikola	Ripsimia of Armenia
Aron	Moses	David	Samuel of Bulgaria	Agatha; Cryselia
Ivan; Vladislav	Maria	Theodora; Kosara	Miroslava	Gavril; Radomir	Hungarian princess
Peter Delyan

This solution fails to conform with any of the relationships appearing in the primary record. It is inferred that the relative familiarity with Germany and unfamiliarity with Hungary partly distorted the depiction of Agatha in the English sources; by this reconstruction she would have been niece of the King of Hungary (Stephen I), who was himself the brother-in-law of the Holy Roman Emperor (Henry II, and therefore kinsman of Henry III).

=== Other theories ===
In 2002, in an article meant not only to refute the Kievan hypothesis, but also to broaden the field of possible alternatives beyond the competing German Imperial and Kievan reconstructions, John Carmi Parsons presented a novel possibility. He pointed out that the Anglo-Saxon Chronicle represents the earliest-surviving testimony, and argues that it was contemporary with Agatha and was very probably well informed in reporting an Imperial kinship. Parsons stresses that the sources claiming Russian parentage for Agatha, and her kinship with a Hungarian queen, are of much later date, and consequently likely to be less reliable than a source contemporary with her. Purely in an attempt to show that not all avenues have been fully pursued in the effort to identify Agatha, Parsons pointed to the documented existence of a German Count Cristinus, whose given name might explain the name Christina for Agatha's daughter. Count Cristinus married a Saxon noblewoman, Oda of Haldensleben, who is hypothesized to have been maternally a granddaughter of Vladimir I of Kiev by a German kinswoman of Emperor Henry III. Parsons also noted that Edward could have married twice, with the contradictory primary record in part reflecting confusion between distinct wives.

Conrad I of Swabia	(perhaps identical)	Cuno of Öhningen
Herman II of Swabia	daughter	St. Vladimir	Anna; Porphyrogeneta
Conrad II	Gisela of Swabia	Bernard of Haldensleben	daughter	Ladislas of Hungary	Premislava	Casimir I of Poland	Maria Dobroniega of Kiev
Henry III	Cristinus	Oda of Haldensleben	Conrad of Haldensleben
Diagnementia; Margaretha

==== Polish hypothesis ====
Recently, a Polish hypothesis has appeared. John P. Ravilious has proposed that Agatha was daughter of Mieszko II Lambert of Poland by his German wife, making her kinswoman of both Emperors Henry, as well as sister of a Hungarian queen, who was married to Béla I. Ravilious and MichaelAnne Guido subsequently published an article setting forth further evidence concerning the hypothesized Polish parentage of Agatha, including the derivation of the name Agatha (and of her putative sister Gertrude of Poland) from the names of saints associated with the abbey of Nivelles. This argument is further supported by the replacement by Andrew I of Hungary (husband of Anastasia of Kiev) of his brother Béla as his heir apparent with his young son Salomon in 1057. If Agatha had been Andrew's sister-in-law, and aunt of Salomon, this act by King Andrew would have strengthened her bonds and those of her husband Edward to Hungary's future: however, if Agatha was a sister-in-law to Béla (husband of Richeza of Poland) she and Edward would most likely have been inclined to leave Hungary in 1057 at the time of Béla's rebellion.

Henry I
Eadgyth of England	Otto I	Adelaide of Italy	Henry I of Bavaria
Conrad of Lorraine	Liutgarde	Otto II	Theophanu of Constantinople	Henry II of Bavaria
Otto of Worms	Otto III	Ezo of Lorraine	Matilda	Henry II	Gisela of Bavaria	Stephen I of Hungary
Henry of Speyer	Mieszko II of Poland	Richeza
Conrad II	Casimir I of Poland	Maria Dobroniega of Kiev	Iziaslav I of Kiev	Gertrude	Béla I of Hungary	Richeza/ Adelaide
Henry III
