= Edgar Ætheling =

11th-century claimant to the throne of England

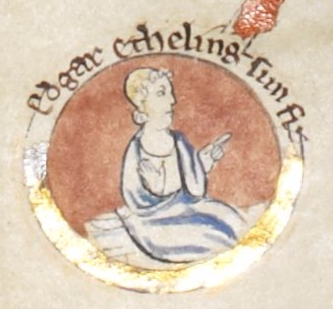
- Edgar, from an illuminated tree of the family of Edmund Ironside

Claimant to the English throne
- Dates of claim: late 1066 and subsequent revolts
- Status: put forward in London never crowned or anointed
- Predecessor: Harold II
- Submitted to: William I
- Born: c. 1052; Kingdom of Hungary
- Died: in or after 1125
- House: Wessex
- Father: Edward the Exile
- Mother: Agatha

Edgar Ætheling (Note: Also spelt Æþeling, Aetheling, Atheling, or Etheling.) (Note: The title Ætheling denotes a son or paternal grandson of a king who is eligible for the throne.) (sometimes referred to as Edgar II) (c. 1052 – 1125 or after) was the last male member of the royal house of Cerdic of Wessex. After the death of Harold II in 1066, Edgar was put forward as king by the Archbishop of York and the leading citizens of London with the support of Earls Edwin and Morcar, but he was never formally anointed. He was one of the English nobles who submitted to William the Conqueror at Berkhamsted. He was later involved in unsuccessful revolts against William. After the last of these, he renounced his English fiefdoms and migrated to Norman Apulia (modern-day Italy) and possibly partook in the First Crusade (or, at least, made pilgrimage to Jerusalem following its conquest). In later life, Edgar was entangled in Norman dynastic struggles before retiring to a quiet life in the countryside.

== Family and early life ==
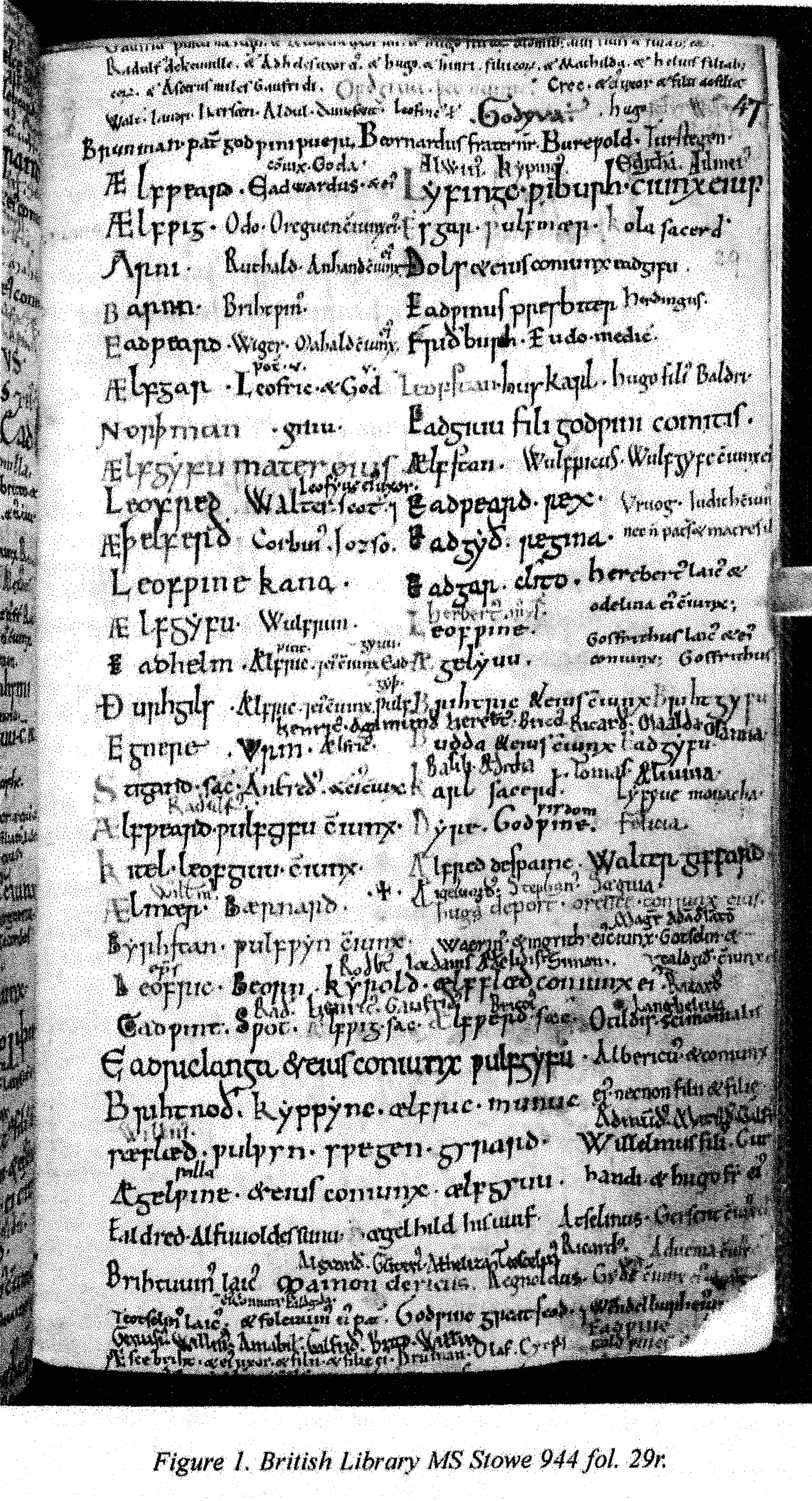
Page in the Liber Vitae of New Minster, Winchester, listing visitors who had entered into confraterity with the abbey. Edgar is listed half-way down on the right as "Eadgar clito"

Edgar was probably born around 1052 in Hungary, where his father Edward the Exile, son of King Edmund Ironside, had found refuge after Edmund's death and the conquest of England by the Danish king Cnut in 1016. Edgar's mother was Agatha, a relative of the German emperor. He had two sisters, Margaret and Cristina, who were probably younger than him.

In 1057, Edward the Exile arrived in England with his family but died almost immediately. Edgar, a child, was left as the only surviving male member of the royal dynasty apart from the king, his great-uncle Edward the Confessor. Edgar was brought up by the Confessor's wife, Edith, and he is recorded in the New Minster Liber Vitae as clito, the Latin for ætheling, a royal prince eligible for the throne. In the view of the historian Tom Licence, Edward chose Edgar as his heir, but this is questioned by other historians, who argue that Edward does not appear to have taken any steps to support his candidacy.

== Succession struggle ==
When King Edward the Confessor died in January 1066, Edgar was still in his early teens and Harold II became king. Contemporary sources such as the Anglo-Saxon Chronicle do not discuss the consideration of other potential claimants.

Modern historians have conjectured that Edgar was considered too young to be an effective military leader. This had not been an insurmountable obstacle in the succession of previous kings. However, the potential challenges for the throne from Norway and Normandy and Edward's failure to prepare a way for Edgar to follow him removed any prospect of a peaceful hereditary succession. War was clearly near-inevitable and Edgar was in no position to fight it, as he was without powerful adult relatives to champion his cause. Accordingly, Harold Godwinson succeeded Edward, as he was the man best placed to defend the country against foreign claimants to the throne.

Following Harold's death at the Battle of Hastings against the invading Normans in October 1066, some of the Anglo-Saxon leaders decided to back young Edgar's claim to the throne. While contemporary accounts such as the Anglo-Saxon chronicles do not provide evidence that he was formally elected king by the Witan, the Worcester Chronicle ("Manuscript D") records that he was chosen as king by the archbishop of York and the leading citizens of London; two of England's great earls, Edwin of Mercia and his brother Morcar of Northumbria, promised their support. However, the earls failed to deliver military assistance and, without it, Edgar's cause was hopeless. In early December, Edgar was among English leaders who submitted to William at Berkhamsted.

== Exile and war against the Normans ==
William kept Edgar in his custody and took him, along with other English leaders, to his court in Normandy in 1067, before returning with them to England. Edgar might have been involved in the abortive rebellion of the Earls Edwin and Morcar in 1068, or he might have been attempting to return to Hungary with his family and been blown off course. In any case, in that year he arrived with his mother and sisters at the court of King Malcolm III of Scotland. Malcolm married Edgar's sister, Margaret, and agreed to support Edgar in his attempt to reclaim the English throne. When the rebellion that resulted in the Harrying of the North broke out in Northumbria at the beginning of 1069, Edgar returned to England with other rebels who had fled to Scotland, to become the leader, or at least the figurehead, of the revolt. However, after early successes the rebels were defeated by William at York, and Edgar again sought refuge with Malcolm who happily allowed him asylum for his loyalty. It appears that Edgar married Malcolm's sister, Margaret Canmore and the union failed to have issue.

In late summer that year, the arrival of a fleet sent by King Sweyn of Denmark triggered a fresh wave of English uprisings in various parts of the country. Edgar and the other exiles sailed to the Humber, where they linked up with Northumbrian rebels and the Danes. Their combined forces overwhelmed the Normans at York and took control of Northumbria, but a small seaborne raid which Edgar led into the former Kingdom of Lindsey ended in disaster, and he escaped with only a handful of followers to rejoin the main army. Late in the year, William fought his way into Northumbria and occupied York, buying off the Danes and devastating the surrounding country. Early in 1070, he moved against Edgar and other English leaders who had taken refuge with their remaining followers in a marshy region, perhaps Holderness or the Isle of Ely, and put them to flight. Edgar returned to Scotland.

He remained there until 1072, when William invaded Scotland and forced King Malcolm to submit to his overlordship. The terms of the agreement between them included the expulsion of Edgar. He therefore took up residence in Flanders, whose count, Robert the Frisian, was hostile to the Normans. However, he was able to return to Scotland in 1074. Shortly after his arrival there, he received an offer from Philip I, King of France, who was also at odds with William, of a castle and lands near the borders of Normandy from where he would be able to raid his enemies' homeland. He embarked with his followers for France, but a storm wrecked their ships on the English coast. Many of Edgar's men were hunted down by the Normans, though he managed to escape with the remainder to Scotland by land. Following this disaster, he was persuaded by Malcolm to make peace with William and return to England as his subject, abandoning any ambition of regaining his ancestral throne.

== Italian venture ==
Disappointed at the level of recompense and respect he received from William, in 1086 Edgar renounced his allegiance to the Conqueror and moved with a retinue of men to Norman Apulia. The Domesday Book, compiled that year, records Edgar's ownership of only two small estates (Barkway and Hermead) in Hertfordshire. This is probably because Edgar had given up his English properties when he left for Italy, not intending to return. In that case, the recording of the Hertfordshire estates under his name is likely to be an anomaly, reflecting a situation which had recently ceased to apply. The venture in the Mediterranean was evidently not a success; within a few years Edgar returned to England.

== Norman and Scottish dynastic strife ==
After King William's death in 1087, Edgar supported William's eldest son Robert Curthose, who succeeded him as Duke of Normandy, against his second son, William Rufus, who received the throne of England as William II. Edgar was one of Robert's three principal advisers at this time. The war waged by Robert and his allies to overthrow William ended in defeat in 1091. As part of the resulting settlement between the brothers, Edgar was deprived of lands which he had been granted by Robert. These were presumably former possessions of William and his supporters in Normandy, confiscated by Robert and distributed to his own followers, including Edgar, but restored to their previous owners by the terms of the peace agreement. The disgruntled Edgar travelled once again to Scotland, where Malcolm was preparing for war with William. When William marched north and the two armies confronted one another, the kings opted to talk rather than fight. The negotiations were conducted by Edgar on behalf of Malcolm, and the newly reconciled Robert Curthose on behalf of William. The resulting agreement included a reconciliation between William and Edgar. However, within months Robert left England, unhappy with William's failure to fulfil the pact between them, and Edgar went with him to Normandy.

Having returned to England, Edgar went to Scotland again in 1093, on a diplomatic mission for William to negotiate with Malcolm, who was dissatisfied with the Norman failure to implement in full the terms of the 1091 treaty. This dispute led to war, and within the year Malcolm had invaded England and had been killed along with his designated heir Edward, eldest of his sons by Margaret, in the Battle of Alnwick. Malcolm's successor, his brother Donald Bán, drove out the English and French retainers who had risen high in Malcolm's service and had thus aroused the jealousy of the existing Scottish aristocracy. This purge brought him into conflict with the Anglo-Norman monarchy, whose influence in Scotland had diminished. William helped Malcolm's eldest son Duncan, who had spent many years as a hostage at William I's court and remained there when set at liberty by William II, to overthrow his uncle, but Donald soon regained the throne and Duncan was killed. Another effort to restore the Anglo-Norman interest through sponsorship of Malcolm's sons was launched in 1097, and Edgar made yet another journey to Scotland, this time in command of an invading army. Donald was ousted, and Edgar installed his nephew and namesake, Malcolm and Margaret's son Edgar, on the Scottish throne.

== First Crusade ==
On 4 March 1098, a fleet manned by Englishmen, probably members of the Varangian Guard, commanded by Edgar, sailed into Port Saint Symeon, bringing supplies of siege materials from the Byzantine Emperor for the First Crusade. He then sailed on to Latakia. William of Malmesbury wrote that Edgar made a pilgrimage to Jerusalem in 1102. William stated that on his way back from Jerusalem, Edgar was given rich gifts by both the Byzantine and the German emperors, each of whom offered him an honoured place at court, but that he insisted on returning home instead.

== Later life ==
Back in Europe, Edgar again took the side of Robert Curthose in the internal struggles of the Norman dynasty, this time against Robert's youngest brother, who was now Henry I, King of England. Robert was taken prisoner in the final defeat at the Battle of Tinchebray in 1106, which resulted in him being imprisoned for the rest of his life. Edgar was more fortunate: having been taken back to England, he was pardoned and released by King Henry. His niece Edith (renamed Matilda), daughter of Malcolm III and Margaret, had married Henry in 1100. Edgar is believed to have travelled to Scotland once more late in life, perhaps around the year 1120. He lived to see the death at sea in the White Ship in November 1120 of William Adelin, the son of his niece, Margaret, and heir to Henry I. Edgar was still alive in 1125, according to William of Malmesbury, who wrote at the time that Edgar "now grows old in the country in privacy and quiet", but he is not recorded thereafter and it is not known when he died.

According to a 1291 Huntingdon Priory Chronicle, Edgar had one child, Margaret Lovel, who was the wife of firstly Ralph Lovel II, of Castle Cary in Somerset, and secondly of Robert de Londres, both of whom had estates in southern Scotland.

There are two references to an "Edgar Adeling" found in the Magnus Rotulus Pipae Northumberland (Pipe rolls) for the years 1158 and 1167. Historian Edward Freeman, writing in The History of the Norman Conquest of England, says that this was the same Edgar (aged over 100), a son of his, or some other person known by the title Ætheling.
