= Saint Margaret of Scotland Anglican Episcopal Church =

Saint Margaret Anglican Episcopal Church
- Saint Margaret of Scotland Anglican Episcopal Church
- Szent Margit Anglikán Episzkopális Egyház
- 47.488007°N 19.066115°E
- Location: Budapest
- Country: Hungary
- Denomination: Anglican
- Churchmanship: Broad church
- Website: www.anglicanbudapest.org

History
- Dedication: Saint Margaret of Scotland
- Dedicated: 1992
- Consecrated: 1992

Administration
- Diocese: Diocese in Europe
- Archdeaconry: Eastern Archdeaconry

Clergy
- Bishop: Rt. Rev. Robert Innes
- Priest(s): Rev. Dr. Frank Hegedűs; Rev. John Wilson; Rev. Daniel Culbertson; Rev. Ádám Bak

The Saint Margaret of Scotland Anglican Episcopal Church (Hungarian: Skóciai Szent Margit Anglikán Episzkopális Egyház) is an Anglican congregation in Budapest, Hungary. The church belongs to the Church of England, part of the Diocese in Europe.

The church is dedicated to Saint Margaret of Scotland, an Anglo-Saxon princess who was born in exile in the Kingdom of Hungary in the 11th century and is the most famous Hungarian saint in the United Kingdom. Margaret was the daughter of the English prince Edward the Exile, and granddaughter of Edmund Ironside, King of England.

== History ==
The Anglican Communion has existed for more than two centuries in Hungary. According to current records, there was an Anglican worship service on the first Sunday after the revolution in 1956, and there have been Anglican missionaries in Hungary since the 1890s. In the Tata Castle in Komárom-Esztergom county, there is an Anglican chapel which was previously used officially.

== Worship ==
A worship service takes place Sunday at 10:30 by Rite II of Church of England in the Lutheran church of Józsefváros (in Szentkirályi utca). Holy Eucharist was celebrated most Sundays at Balaton in the village of Zalaszántó near the town of Keszthely and the spa centre at Hévíz, but the residing priest moved back to New Zealand in 2025.

== Sources ==
- Anglicans in Hungary, published by The Rev. Dr. Frank Hegedűs
