= Eustace III of Boulogne =

Count of Boulogne (c. 1050–c. 1125)

Eustace III
- Born: c. 1050
- Died: c. 1125 (aged about 75); France
- Noble family: House of Flanders
- Spouse: Mary of Scotland
- Issue: Matilda of Boulogne
- Father: Eustace II of Boulogne
- Mother: Ida of Lorraine

Eustace III (c. 1050 – c. 1125) was the count of Boulogne from 1087 succeeding his father, Eustace II. He joined the First Crusade, being present at Nicaea, Dorylaeum, Antioch, and Jerusalem. After fighting in the Battle of Ascalon, he returned home. He was offered the Kingdom of Jerusalem after the death of his brother King Baldwin I and set out to claim it, but returned when he received news of Baldwin of Bourcq's election to the throne. On his return to Boulogne, he founded a Cluniac monastery in Rumilly, retired as a monk, and died in 1125.

== Early life and family ==
Eustace was the son of Count Eustace II and Ida of Lorraine. In 1088, he rebelled against William II of England in favour of Robert Curthose. Whilst waiting for Robert Curthose's arrival from Normandy, Eustace and his fellow compatriots were besieged at Rochester Castle by William II. With provisions running out and the situation becoming dire within the castle, the rebels asked for terms. William II pardoned most of the rebels allowing those such as Eustace to return to Normandy. In 1091, Eustace was with Robert Curthose when the latter agreed to terms with William II, recognising him as king of England.

Eustace married Mary, daughter of King Malcolm III of Scotland and Saint Margaret of Scotland. Eustace and Mary had a daughter, Matilda.

== Crusade ==
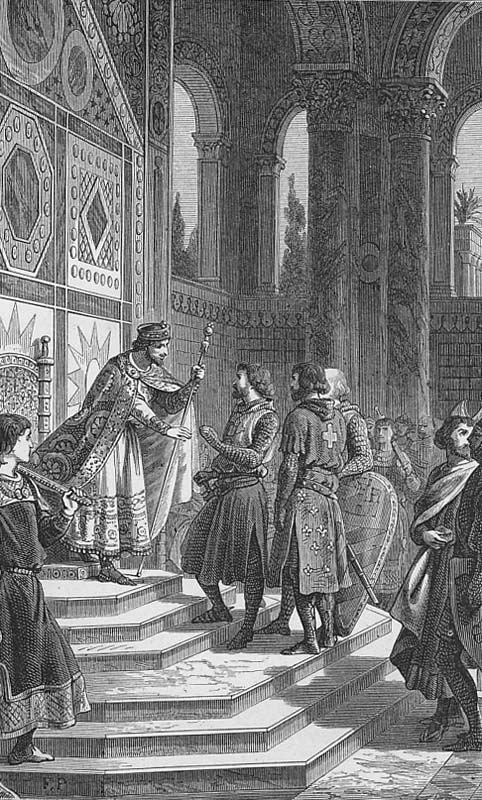
Eustace (shown with white hair) with his brothers Godfrey and Baldwin are received by Emperor Alexios I Komnenos, as imagined in the 19th century

Eustace participated in the First Crusade of 1096 along with his brothers Godfrey (duke of Lower Lotharingia) and Baldwin. It is unclear whether he travelled eastwards with his brother Godfrey's or Robert Curthose's army, although throughout the journey to Jerusalem, Eustace assisted Godfrey. Eustace was present at the Siege of Nicaea (May–June 1097), and helped to rescue Bohemund of Taranto's beleaguered troops at the Battle of Dorylaeum (1 July 1097), defeated an enemy ambush during the Siege of Antioch, and was one of the commanders during the capture of Antioch on 3 June 1098.

Eustace, as a member of the council held at Ruj on 4 January 1099, mediated the conflict over the control of Antioch between Bohemund of Taranto and Raymond IV of Toulouse. In early December 1098, Eustace joined Raymond's attack on Maarrat al-Nu'man and an attack on Nablus in July 1099. He gained notoriety for his actions during the Siege of Jerusalem fighting relentlessly from a siege tower along with his brother Godfrey and the crusaders they commanded. They were among the first to breach Jerusalem's city walls and participated in the ensuing massacre. Eustace commanded a division of the crusader army during the Battle of Ascalon, and was a patron of the Knights Templar.

== Return home ==
While his brothers stayed in the Holy Land, Eustace returned to administer his domains. The mint at Boulogne struck silver coins to commemorate Eustace's crusading adventures. The coins displayed a lion above the walls of Jerusalem stamped on the obverse.

When his youngest brother Baldwin I of Jerusalem died in 1118, the elderly Eustace was offered the throne. Eustace was at first uninterested, but was convinced to accept it. He travelled all the way to Apulia before learning that a distant relative, Baldwin of Bourcq, had been crowned in the meantime.

Eustace returned to Boulogne, founded the Cluniac house of Rumilly, and retired there as a Cluniac monk. He died about 1125.

On his death the county of Boulogne was inherited by his daughter, Matilda.

== Sources ==
- Aird, William M. (2011). Robert 'Curthose', Duke of Normandy (C. 1050–1134). Boydell Press.
- Barber, Malcolm (2012). The Crusader States. Yale University Press.
- Barlow, Frank (1983). William Rufus. University of California Press.
- Cowdrey, Herbert Edward John (1978). Two Studies in Cluniac History, 1049–1126. LAS.
- Huneycutt, Lois (2019). "Becoming Anglo-Norman: The Women of the House of Wessex in the century after the Norman Conquest". In Paranque, Estelle; Schutte, Valerie (eds.). Forgotten Queens in Medieval and Early Modern Europe: Political Agency, Myth-Making, and Patronage. Routledge.
- Mayer, Hans Eberhard (1985). "The Succession to Baldwin II of Jerusalem: English Impact on the East". Dumbarton Oaks Papers. 38: 139–147. doi:10.2307/1291522. JSTOR 1291522.
- Murray, Alan V. (2000). The Crusader Kingdom of Jerusalem: A Dynastic History 1099–1125. Prosopographica et Genealogica.
- Tanner, Heather J. (2003). "In his brother's shadow: the crusading career and reputation of Eustace III of Boulogne". In Semaan, Khalil I. (ed.). The Crusades: other experiences, alternate perspectives. Selected proceedings from the 32nd annual Cemers conference. Center for Medieval and Renaissance Studies.
- Tyerman, Christopher, ed. (2012). Chronicles of the First Crusade. Penguin.

Eustace III of Boulogne House of Boulogne Born: before 1060 Died: c. 1125
Preceded by Eustace II	Count of Boulogne; 1087–1125	Succeeded by Matilda I
