= Mary of Boulogne =

Mary of Boulogne may refer to:

- Mary of Scotland, Countess of Boulogne
- Mary of Blois, Countess of Boulogne
