= Edward the Exile =

Son of King Edmund Ironside (1016–1057)

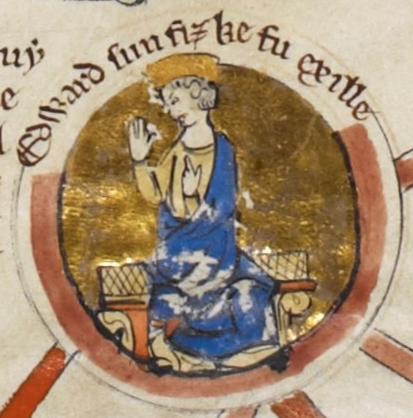
- Edward the Exile depicted on a medieval genealogical scroll
- Born: c. 1016
- Died: 19 April 1057 (aged 40–41); England
- Spouse: Agatha
- Issue: Edgar Ætheling; Margaret, Queen of Scots; Cristina, Abbess of Romsey Abbey
- House: Wessex
- Father: Edmund Ironside
- Mother: Ealdgyth

Edward the Exile (c. 1016 – 19 April 1057), also called Edward Ætheling, was the son of King Edmund Ironside and of Ealdgyth. He spent most of his life in exile in the Kingdom of Hungary following the defeat of his father by Cnut.

== Exile ==
After the Danish conquest of England in 1016, Canute had Edward, said to be only a few months old, and his brother Edmund, sent to the Swedish court of Olof Skötkonung (who was either Canute's half-brother or his stepbrother), supposedly with instructions to have the children murdered. However, Olof was an old ally of Æthelred the Unready, the princes' grandfather, and he declined to kill them. From this point their fate is subject to speculation.

Some reconstructions have them being sent by Olof to the Hungarian royal court of King Stephen I, while others have the Kievan court of Yaroslav the Wise as their next destination, being sent not by Olof but by one of his sons, after Canute conquered Norway and a part of Sweden in 1028. Whether going there directly or indirectly they are thought to have been joined in the Kievan principality in the 1030s by another exiled prince, Andrew of Hungary. Prince Andrew returned to Hungary in 1046 to retake the throne; Edward and Edmund are likely to have accompanied him and fought with his army, and it is possible that they were present at his coronation.

A Hungarian estate with Réka Castle in the middle is called Latin: Terra Britanorum de Nadasd, and local tradition attributes this name to a grant made by King Stephen of Hungary to the English Edward, which if true would place him in Hungary before Stephen's death in 1038.

== Return ==
On hearing that Edward was alive, Edward the Confessor recalled him to England in 1056 and made him his heir. Edward the Ætheling offered the last chance of an undisputed succession within the Saxon royal house. News of Edward's existence came at a time when the old Anglo-Saxon monarchy, restored after a long period of Danish domination, was heading for catastrophe. The Confessor, personally devout but politically weak and childless, was unable to make an effective stand against the steady advance of the powerful and ambitious sons of Godwin, Earl of Wessex. From across the Channel William, Duke of Normandy also had an eye on the succession. Edward the Exile appeared at just the right time. Approved both by the king and by the Witan, the Council of the Realm, he offered a way out of the impasse, a counter both to the Godwinsons and to William, and one with a legitimacy that could not be readily challenged.

In 1054 King Edward sent Ealdred, Bishop of Worcester, to the court of the German emperor to set in train negotiations with the king of Hungary for the return of Edward the Exile. Ealdred was not at first successful, and in 1056 Earl Harold Godwinson's journey to Flanders, and possibly on to Germany and Hungary, was probably undertaken to further negotiations. The Exile finally arrived in England in 1057 with his wife and children, but died within a few days, on 19 April, without meeting the King. He was buried in Old St Paul's Cathedral.

== Family ==
Edward's wife was named Agatha; her origins are disputed. Their children were:

- Edgar Ætheling (c. 1051 – c. 1126) – Elected King of England after the Battle of Hastings but submitted to William the Conqueror.
- Saint Margaret of Scotland (c. 1045 – 16 November 1093) – Married King Malcolm III of Scotland.
- Cristina (c. 1040 – c. 1093) – Abbess at Romsey Abbey.

Edward's granddaughter Edith of Scotland, also called Matilda, married King Henry I of England, continuing the Anglo-Saxon line into the post-Conquest English monarchy.

== Ancestry ==
Edward the Exile was a direct descendant of a line of Wessex kings dating back, at least on the pages of the Anglo-Saxon Chronicle, to the arrival of Cerdic of Wessex in AD 495, nearly a century after the withdrawal of the Western Roman Empire army legions from Hadrian's Wall, and including Alfred the Great in the English monarchs family tree.

== See also ==
- House of Wessex family tree

== Sources ==
- Barrow, G. W. S. (2003). "Companions of the Atheling". Anglo-Norman Studies. XXV: 35–46. ISSN 0954-9927.
- Kristó, Gyula; Makk, Ferenc (1996). Az Árpád-ház uralkodói [Rulers of the House of Árpád] (in Hungarian). I.P.C. Könyvek. ISBN 963-7930-97-3.
- von Redlich, Marcellus D. R. (1940). "The Parentage of Agatha, Wife of Prince Edward the Exile". The National Genealogical Society Quarterly. 28: 105–109.
