= Malcolm III of Scotland =

King of Alba from 1058 to 1093

Malcolm III
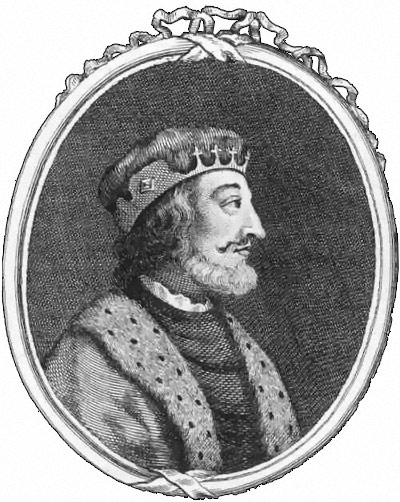

King of Alba (Scotland)
- Reign: 17 March 1058 – 13 November 1093
- Inauguration: 25 April 1058? Scone, Perth and Kinross
- Predecessor: Lulach
- Successor: Donald III
- Died: 13 November 1093; Alnmouth, Northumberland, England
- Burial: El Escorial monastery, Madrid; formerly Dunfermline Abbey, though initially interred at Tynemouth Priory
- Spouses: Ingibiorg Finnsdottir; Margaret of Wessex
- Issue more...: Duncan II, King of Scots; Domnall; Edmund; Ethelred, Abbot of Dunkeld; Edgar, King of Scotland; Alexander I, King of Scotland; David I, King of Scotland; Matilda, Queen of England; Mary, Countess of Boulogne
- House: Dunkeld
- Father: Duncan I of Scotland
- Mother: Suthen

Malcolm III (Middle Irish: Máel Coluim mac Donnchada; Scottish Gaelic: Maol Chaluim mac Dhonnchaidh; died 13 November 1093) was King of Alba (Scotland) from 1058 to 1093. He was later nicknamed "Canmore" (Scottish Gaelic: ceann mòr, lit. 'big head', understood as "great chief"). Malcolm's long reign of 35 years preceded the beginning of the Scoto-Norman age.

Malcolm's kingdom did not extend over the full territory of modern Scotland: many of the islands and the land north of the River Oykel were Scandinavian, and south of the Firth of Forth there were numerous independent or semi-independent realms, including the kingdom of Strathclyde and Bamburgh, and it is not certain what (if any) power the Scots exerted there on Malcolm's accession. Throughout his reign, Malcolm III led at least five invasions into English territory. One of Malcolm's primary achievements was to secure the position of the lineage that would rule Scotland until the late thirteenth century. He appears as a major character in William Shakespeare's Macbeth. His second wife, Margaret, was canonised as a saint in the thirteenth century.

== Background ==
Malcolm's father Duncan I became king in late 1034, on the death of Malcolm II, Duncan's maternal grandfather and Malcolm's great-grandfather. One Scottish king-list gives Malcolm's mother the name Suthen (Suthain), a Gaelic name; John of Fordun states that Malcolm's mother was a "blood relative" (consanguinea) of the Danish earl Siward, though this may be a late attempt to deepen the Scottish royal family's links to the earldom of Northumbria (of which Siward was regarded as founder). Later tradition, attested by the fifteenth century, makes Malcolm's mother the daughter of the miller of Forteviot and presents Malcolm as a bastard.

Duncan's reign ended violently; he was killed in battle in Moray on 15 August 1040, by a force under the command of Macbeth. Duncan may have been young at the time of his death, and Malcolm and his brother Donald were probably children. Malcolm's paternal grandfather was killed in battle in 1045, possibly as part of some continuing conflict with Macbeth.

According to later tradition, Duncan's two young sons were sent away for greater safety — exactly where is the subject of debate. According to one version, Malcolm's brother Donald was sent to the Isles; and Malcolm was sent to England; based on Fordun's account, it came to be assumed that Malcolm passed most of Macbeth's seventeen-year reign in the Kingdom of England at the court of Edward the Confessor. It is also possible that Malcolm went into exile at the court of Thorfinn Sigurdsson, Earl of Orkney, an enemy of Macbeth's family; Ireland and Strathclyde may be other possible locations. But neither the place of exile, nor the fact of exile itself, are certainties.

An English invasion in 1054, with Siward, Earl of Northumbria in command, had as its goal the installation of one "Máel Coluim, son of the king of the Cumbrians". This Máel Coluim was traditionally identified with the later Malcolm III. The interpretation derives from the Chronicle attributed to John of Fordun, as well as from earlier sources such as William of Malmesbury. The latter reported that Macbeth was killed in the battle by Siward, but it is known that Macbeth outlived Siward by two years. A.A.M. Duncan argued in 2002 that, using the Anglo-Saxon Chronicle entry as their source, later writers innocently misidentified "Máel Coluim" with the later Scottish king of the same name. A.A.M. Duncan's argument has been supported by several subsequent historians specialising in the era, such as Richard Oram, Dauvit Broun and Alex Woolf. It has also been suggested that Máel Coluim may have been a son of Owain Foel, British King of Strathclyde perhaps by a daughter of Malcolm II, King of Scotland.

In 1057, various chroniclers report the death of Macbeth, at Malcolm's hand on 15 August 1057 at Lumphanan in Aberdeenshire. Macbeth was succeeded by his stepson Lulach, who was crowned at Scone, probably on 8 September 1057. Lulach was killed by Malcolm, "by treachery", near Huntly on 23 April 1058. After this, Malcolm became king, perhaps inaugurated on 25 April 1058, although only John of Fordun reports this.

== Early reign ==
If Orderic Vitalis is to be relied upon, in the time of Edward the Confessor, Malcolm was betrothed to the English king's kinswoman Margaret, and it is possible this happened when he visited England in 1059. If a marriage agreement was made in 1059, it did not stop the Scots from plundering Lindisfarne in 1061. It was common practice in medieval Gaelic-speaking societies for kings to launch an invasion, the so-called crech ríg, of a neighbour soon after taking power, and the Lindisfarne raid may have been used to boost the stability of the new regime. Since the invasion affected directly only the territory of the rulers of Bamburgh, it is unlikely to have particularly bothered either King Edward or the ealdorman of Northumbria in York, Tostig Godwinson, who at that time on pilgrimage to Rome and who did not enjoy a good relationship with the Bamburgh family. Malcolm may have had specific political motives. For instance, it has been suggested that he may have been trying to advance the position of Gospatric, his possible cousin, at the expense of the ruling Eadwulfing family. It has also been suggested that the raid may have been part of a dispute about the status of Strathclyde.

A tradition in the thirteenth-century Orkneyinga saga related that Malcolm married the widow of Thorfinn Sigurdsson, Ingibiorg, a daughter of Finn Arnesson. Ingibiorg may have died before Malcolm's marriage to Margaret. Malcolm may also have discarded Ingibiorg when the opportunity to marry a higher-status lady arose in 1068. The Orkneyinga Saga also claimed that Duncan (Donnchad mac Maíl Coluim), later king, was a product of this union. Some Medieval commentators, following William of Malmesbury, claimed that Duncan was illegitimate. Still, this claim is propaganda reflecting the need of Malcolm and Margaret's descendants to undermine the claims of Duncan's descendants, the MacWilliams. Similarly, however, the importance of the MacWilliams to the earls of Orkney around 1200 would have provided an incentive to strengthen the historical ties between the two families, thus Ingibiorg's marriage to Malcolm may have been created to fabricate common descent.

The obituary of a certain Domnall, another son of Malcolm, is reported in 1085; since Domnall has no recorded mother, he may also have been born to Ingibiorg or else to some other unrecorded woman. If historical, Malcolm's marriage to Ingibiorg would have helped create a favourable political position in the north and west. The Heimskringla tells that her father Finn had been an adviser to Harald Hardrada, king of Norway, and, after falling out with Harald, was then made an Earl by Sweyn Estridsson, king of Denmark, which may have been another recommendation for the match. Malcolm appears to have enjoyed a peaceful relationship with the Earldom of Orkney, ruled jointly by his possible stepsons, Paul and Erlend Thorfinnsson. The Orkneyinga Saga reports strife with Norway, but this may be misplaced as it associates this with Magnus Barefoot, who became king of Norway only in 1093, the year of Malcolm's death.

Malcolm gave sanctuary to Tostig Godwinson when the Northumbrians drove him out in 1065 and appears to have offered indirect support to the ill-fated invasion of England by Harald Hardrada and Tostig in 1066, which ended in defeat and death at the battle of Stamford Bridge. In 1068, he granted asylum to a group of English exiles fleeing from William of Normandy, among them Agatha, widow of Edward the Confessor's nephew Edward the Exile, and her children: Edgar Ætheling and his sisters Margaret and Cristina. They were accompanied by Gospatric, by this time earl of Bamburgh. The exiles were disappointed, however, if they had expected immediate assistance from the Scots.

== Marriage to Margaret ==
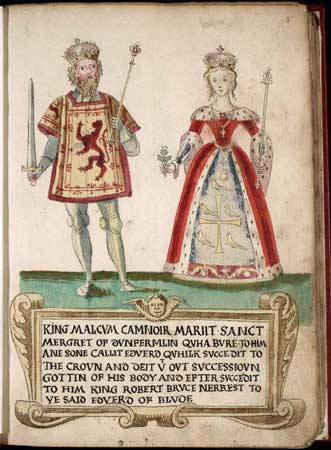
Portrait of Malcolm and Margaret, from the Forman Armorial (1562)

In 1069, the exiles returned to England to join a spreading revolt in the north. Even though Gospatric and Siward's son Waltheof submitted by the end of the year, the arrival of a Danish army under Sweyn Estridsson seemed to ensure that William's position remained weak. Malcolm decided on war and took his army south into Cumbria and across the Pennines, wasting Teesdale and Cleveland then marching north, loaded with loot, to Wearmouth, now part of the City of Sunderland. There, Malcolm met Edgar and his family, who were invited to return with him but did not. As Sweyn had by now been bought off with a large Danegeld, Malcolm took his army home. Against the backdrop of William's scorched earth policy against the northern English rebels, William sent Gospatric to raid Scotland through Cumbria as a further act of reprisal. In return, the Scots fleet raided the Northumbrian coast, where Gospatric's possessions were concentrated. Late in the year, perhaps shipwrecked on their way to a European exile, Edgar and his family again arrived in Scotland, this time to remain. By the end of 1070, Malcolm had married Edgar's sister Margaret (later known as Saint Margaret).

The naming of their children represented a break with the traditional Scots regal names such as Malcolm, Cináed and Áed. The point of naming Margaret's sons — Edward after her father Edward the Exile, Edmund for her grandfather Edmund Ironside, Ethelred for her great-grandfather Ethelred the Unready and Edgar for her great-great-grandfather Edgar and her brother, briefly the elected king, Edgar Ætheling — was unlikely to be missed in England, where William of Normandy's grasp on power was far from secure. Whether the adoption of the classical Alexander for the future Alexander I of Scotland (either for Pope Alexander II or for Alexander the Great) and the biblical David for the future David I of Scotland represented a recognition that William of Normandy would not be easily removed, or was due to the repetition of Anglo-Saxon royal names — another Edmund had preceded Edgar — is not known. Margaret also gave Malcolm two daughters, Edith, who married Henry I of England, and Mary, who married Eustace III of Boulogne.

In 1072, with the Harrying of the North completed and his position again secure, William of Normandy came north with an army and a fleet. Malcolm met William at Abernethy and, in the words of the Anglo-Saxon Chronicle, "became his man" and handed over his eldest son Duncan as a hostage and arranged peace between William and Edgar. Accepting the overlordship of the king of the English was no novelty, as previous kings had done so without result. The same was true of Malcolm; his agreement with the English king was followed by further raids into Northumbria, which led to further trouble in the earldom and the killing of Bishop Walcher at Gateshead. In 1080, William sent his son Robert Curthose north with an army while his brother Odo punished the Northumbrians. Malcolm again made peace, and this time kept it for over a decade.

Malcolm faced little recorded internal opposition, except for Lulach's son Máel Snechtai. In an unusual entry, as the Anglo-Saxon Chronicle contains little on Scotland, it says that in 1078:

Malcholom [Máel Coluim] seized the mother of Mælslæhtan [Máel Snechtai] ... and all his treasures, and his cattle; and he himself escaped with difficulty.

Whatever provoked this strife, Máel Snechtai survived until 1085.

== Malcolm and William Rufus ==
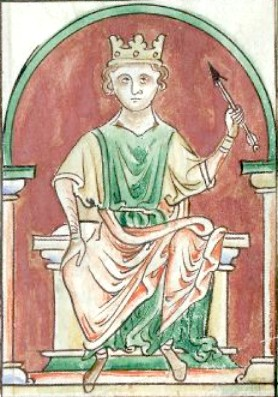
William Rufus, "the Red", king of the English (1087–1100)

When William Rufus became king of England after his father's death, Malcolm did not intervene in the rebellions by supporters of William's elder brother Robert Curthose that followed. In 1091, William Rufus confiscated Edgar Ætheling's lands in England, and Edgar fled north to Scotland. In May, Malcolm marched south, not to raid and take slaves and plunder, but to besiege Newcastle, where the New Castle had been built by Robert Curthose in 1080. This appears to have been an attempt to advance the frontier south from the River Tweed to the River Tees. The threat was enough to bring the English king back from Normandy, where he had been fighting Robert Curthose. In September, learning of William Rufus's approaching army, Malcolm withdrew north, and the English followed. Unlike in 1072, Malcolm was prepared to fight, but a peace was arranged by Edgar Ætheling and Robert Curthose whereby Malcolm again acknowledged the overlordship of the English king.

In 1092, the peace began to break down. Based on the idea that the Scots controlled much of modern Cumbria, it had been supposed that William Rufus's new castle at Carlisle and his settlement of English peasants in the locality was the cause. It is unlikely that Malcolm controlled Cumbria, and the dispute instead concerned the estates granted to Malcolm by William Rufus's father in 1072 for his maintenance when visiting England. Malcolm sent messengers to discuss the question, and William Rufus agreed to a meeting. Malcolm travelled south to Gloucester, stopping at Wilton Abbey to visit his daughter Edith and sister-in-law Cristina. Malcolm arrived there on 24 August 1093 to find that William Rufus refused to negotiate, insisting that the dispute be decided by the English barons. This, Malcolm refused to accept and returned immediately to Scotland.

It does not appear that William Rufus intended to provoke a war, but, as the Anglo-Saxon Chronicle reports, war came:

For this reason therefore they parted with great dissatisfaction, and King Malcolm returned to Scotland. And soon after he came home, he gathered his army, and came harrowing into England with more hostility than behoved him ...

Malcolm was accompanied by Edward, his eldest son by Margaret and probable heir-designate (or tánaiste), and by Edgar. Even by the standards of the time, the ravaging of Northumbria by the Scots was seen as harsh.

== Death ==
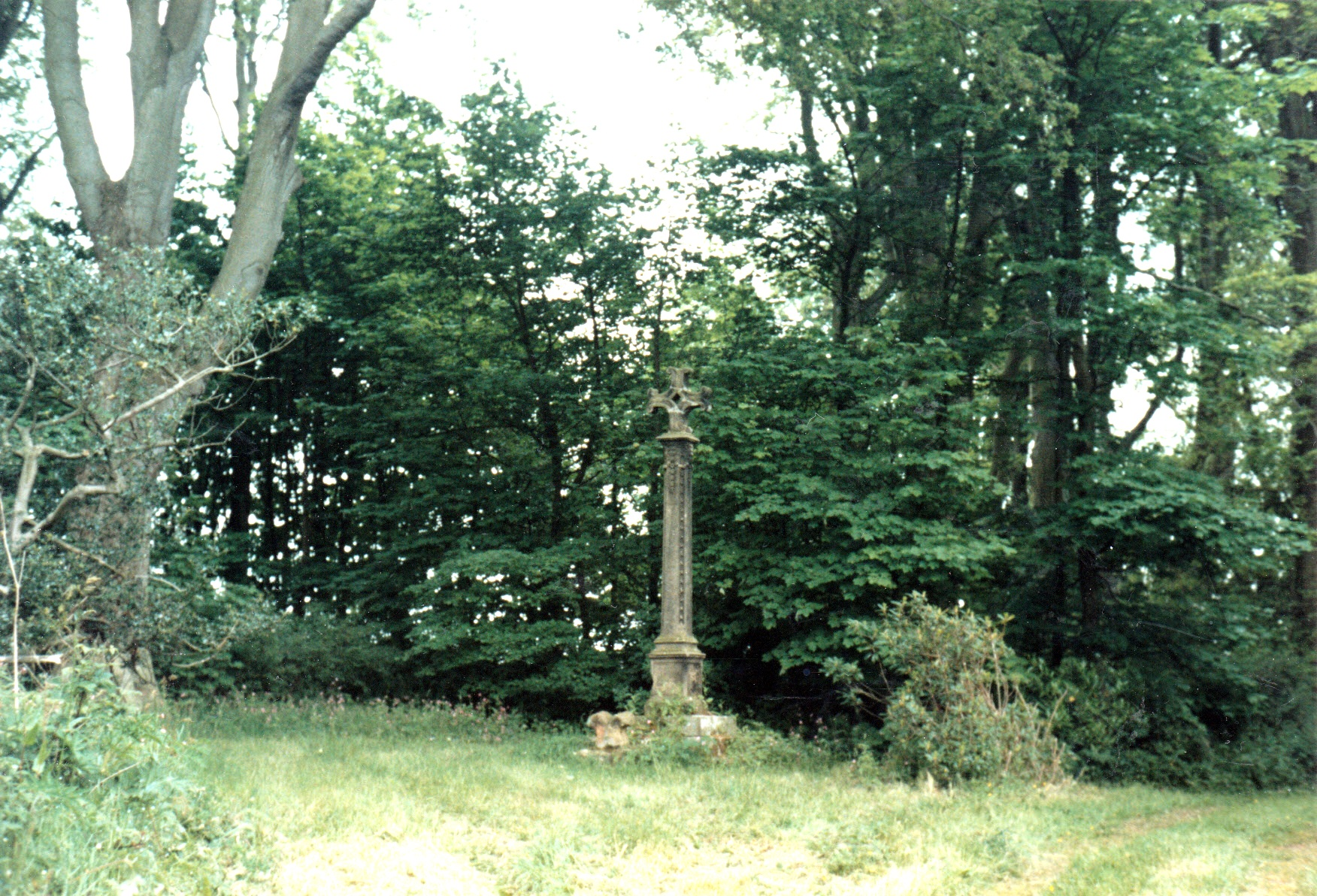
Memorial cross said to mark the spot where King Malcolm III of Scotland was killed while besieging Alnwick Castle in 1093.

While marching north again, Malcolm was confronted by the forces Robert de Mowbray, Earl of Northumbria, at Alnmouth on 13 November 1093. During the encounter at Alnmouth he was killed by Robert's steward, Morel of Bamburgh. Edward was mortally wounded in the same fight. Margaret, it is said, died soon after receiving the news of their deaths from Edgar. The Annals of Ulster say:

Mael Coluim son of Donnchad, over-king of Scotland, and Edward his son, were killed by the French [i.e. Normans] in Inber Alda in England. His queen, Margaret, moreover, died of sorrow for him within nine days.

Malcolm's body was taken to Tynemouth Priory for burial. The king's body was sent north for reburial, in the reign of his son Alexander, at Dunfermline Abbey, or possibly Iona. Although contemporary sources cite Malcolm's death location as Alnmouth, in subsequent centuries, the location of the encounter moved inland to Alnwick. Malcolm was succeeded by his brother, Donald III.

On 19 June 1250, following the canonization of Malcolm's wife Margaret by Pope Innocent IV, Margaret's remains were disinterred and placed in a reliquary. It was claimed that as the reliquary was carried to the high altar of Dunfermline Abbey, past Malcolm's grave, it became too heavy to move. As a result, Malcolm's remains were also disinterred and buried next to Margaret beside the altar. The remains of Margaret and her husband were removed from Dunfermline by Abbot George Durie to safeguard them from the attacks of Protestant reformers; initially they went to the rural estate at Craigluscar then abroad. Finally, by 1580, they were enshrined at the instigation of king Philip II of Spain in the royal monastery of St Lawrence near Madrid, San Lorenzo de El Escorial, where they supposedly remain, although their current whereabouts into the huge building are unknown.

== Issue ==
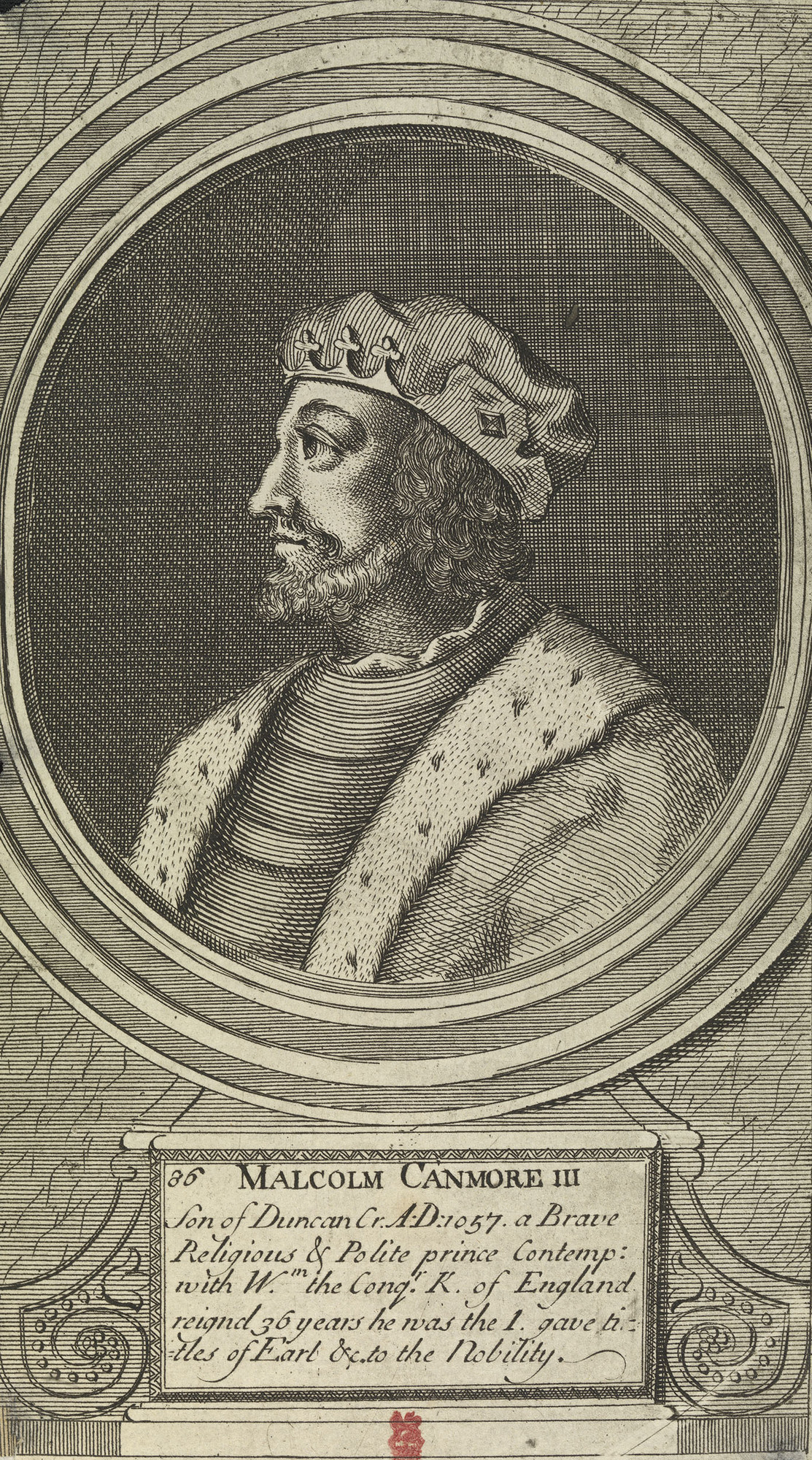
18th century engraving of Malcolm III

Malcolm and Ingibiorg had three sons:

1. King Duncan II of Scotland;
2. Donald, died ca. 1094;
3. Malcolm (possible)

Malcolm and Margaret had eight children, six sons and two daughters:

1. Edward, killed 1093;
2. Edmund of Scotland;
3. Ethelred, abbot of Dunkeld; Mormaer of Moray
4. King Edgar of Scotland;
5. King Alexander I of Scotland;
6. Matilda of Scotland, married Henry I of England;
7. Mary of Scotland, married Eustace III of Boulogne;
8. David I of Scotland.

== Bibliography ==
- Anderson, Alan Orr (1990) [1922]. Early Sources of Scottish History A.D. 500–1286. Vol. 1 (2nd ed.). Stamford, UK: Paul Watkins. ISBN 1-871615-03-8.
- Anderson, Alan Orr (1908). Scottish Annals from English Chroniclers. London: D. Nutt.
- Anderson, Marjorie Ogilvie (1980). Kings and Kingship in Early Scotland (Revised ed.). Edinburgh: Scottish Academic Press. ISBN 0-7011-1604-8.
- Barrell, A. D. M. (2000). Medieval Scotland. Cambridge, UK: Cambridge University Press. ISBN 0-521-58602-X.
- Barrow, G. W. S. (1989). Kingship and Unity: Scotland, 1000–1306 (Reprinted with corrections ed.). Edinburgh University Press. ISBN 0-7486-0104-X.
- Barrow, G. W. S. (2008). "Malcolm III [Mael Coluim Ceann Mór, Malcolm Canmore] (d. 1093)". Oxford Dictionary of National Biography. Oxford University Press. doi:10.1093/ref:odnb/17859. (subscription, Wikipedia Library access or UK public library membership required)
- Broun, Dauvit (1999). The Irish Identity of the Kingdom of the Scots in the Twelfth and Thirteenth Centuries. Woodbridge, UK: Boydell. ISBN 0-85115-375-5.
- Burton, John Hill (1876). The History of Scotland. Vol. 1 (New ed.). Edinburgh: W. Blackwood.
- Clancy, Thomas Owen (2002). "St. Margaret". In Lynch, Michael (ed.). The Oxford Companion to Scottish History. Oxford, UK: Oxford University Press. ISBN 0-19-211696-7.
- Duncan, Archie (2002). The Kingship of the Scots 842–1292: Succession and Independence. Edinburgh, UK: Edinburgh University Press. ISBN 0-7486-1626-8.
- Dunlop, Eileen (2005). Queen Margaret of Scotland. Edinburgh, UK: National Museums of Scotland. ISBN 1-901663-92-2.
- Hammond, Matthew H. (April 2006). "Ethnicity and Writing of Medieval Scottish History". The Scottish Historical Review. 85: 1–27.
- Magnusson, Magnus (2000). Scotland: The Story of a Nation. Atlantic Monthly Press. ISBN 978-0871137982.
- McDonald, R. Andrew (1997). The Kingdom of the Isles: Scotland's Western Seaboard, c. 1100–1336. East Linton, UK: Tuckwell Press. ISBN 1-898410-85-2.
- McDonald, R. Andrew (2003). Outlaws of Medieval Scotland: Challenges to the Canmore Kings, 1058–1266. East Linton, UK: Tuckwell Press. ISBN 1-86232-236-8.
- McGuigan, Neil (2021). Máel Coluim, Canmore: An Eleventh-Century King. John Donald / Birlinn. ISBN 978-1910900192.
- Oram, Richard (2004). David I: The King Who Made Scotland. Stroud, UK: Tempus. ISBN 0-7524-2825-X.
- Orkneyinga Saga: The History of the Earls of Orkney. Translated by Pálsson, Hermann; Edwards, Paul. London: Penguin. 1978. ISBN 0-14-044383-5.
- Paul, James Balfour, ed. (1904). The Scots Peerage. Vol. I. Edinburgh: David Douglas.
- Purdie, Rhiannon (2015). "Malcolm, Margaret, Macbeth and the Miller". Medievalia et Humanistica. New. 41: 45–63.
- Ritchie, R. L. Graeme (1954). The Normans in Scotland. Edinburgh, UK: Edinburgh University Press.
- Young, James, ed. (1884). Notes on Historical References to the Scottish Family of Lauder. Glasgow: T. Duncan.

Malcolm III of Scotland House of Dunkeld
Regnal titles
Preceded by Lulach	King of Alba; 1058–1093	Succeeded by Donald III
