= Cristina (daughter of Edward the Exile) =

11th-century Anglo-Saxon princess and abbess

- Born: before 1057; Kingdom of Hungary
- Died: c. 1100 unknown
- House: Wessex
- Father: Edward the Exile
- Mother: Agatha

Cristina, daughter of Edward the Exile and Agatha, was the sister of Edgar Ætheling and Saint Margaret of Scotland, born in the 1040s. Cristina's nieces Edith and Mary were sent to Romsey Abbey, near Southampton, in 1086 when she was abbess.

== Life ==
Cristina came to the Kingdom of England with her family in 1057, from Hungary. Along with her siblings, she went into exile in the Kingdom of Scotland, at the court of Malcolm III, her future brother-in-law.

At some time before 1086, Cristina returned to England and entered the nunnery at Romsey Abbey in Hampshire, where she tutored her nieces Edith and Mary.

Edith gave testimony to a conclave of bishops summoned by Archbishop Anselm of Canterbury to determine whether Edith could lawfully marry Henry I of England. During that enquiry, she stated that she had never taken holy vows, insisting that her parents had sent her and her sister to England for educational purposes, and that her aunt Cristina had veiled her to protect her "from the lust of the Normans". Edith claimed she had pulled the veil off and stamped on it, and that Cristina had beaten and scolded her for it.

Cristina's land-holdings in Ulverley, Warwickshire and Gloucestershire are recorded in the Domesday Book of 1086. The date of her death is not known, but she does not appear to have given evidence to the conclave, suggesting she died sometime before 1100. Additional evidence of her death includes the transfer before 1093 of her nieces to Wilton Abbey in Wiltshire for further education and the appointment of Eadgyth as the next abbess of Romsey Abbey.

== Sources ==
- Tout, Thomas Frederick (1887). "Christina" . In Stephen, Leslie (ed.). Dictionary of National Biography. Vol. 10. London: Smith, Elder & Co.
