= Ethelred of Scotland =

Scottish royal

- Born: c. 1072
- Died: c. 1093
- House: Dunkeld
- Father: Malcolm III of Scotland
- Mother: Margaret of Wessex

Ethelred (Irish: Edelret mac Maíl Coluim, Old English: Æthelred Margotsson; c. 1072 – c. 1093) was the son of King Malcolm III of Scotland (Irish: Máel Coluim III) and his wife Margaret of Wessex (Saint Margaret of Scotland); third child of his mother and the probable sixth child of his father. He took his name, almost certainly, from Margaret's great-grandfather Æthelred the Unready. He became the lay abbot of Dunkeld.

== Brothers ==
Ethelred had four brothers who would rule as kings of Scotland. His older half-brother was King Duncan II of Scotland (the son of Malcolm III's first wife, Ingibiorg Finnsdottir). Duncan reigned from May 1094 to 12 November 1094. Of his full brothers (the sons of Margaret), Edgar reigned from 1097 to 1107; Alexander I, from 1107 to 1124; and David I, from 1124 to 1153. Another brother, Edward, died alongside his father at the Battle of Alnwick in Northumberland in 1093. His brother Edmund became a monk.

== Lay Abbot of Dunkeld ==
Though called the abbot of Dunkeld, Ethelred was not necessarily a churchman. It has been argued that because of the decaying state of the Celtic Church, abbacies in this time period “were often held by laymen, who drew the revenues and appointed churchmen to perform the ecclesiastical offices.”

== Lands ==
Along with the appointment as lay abbot of Dunkeld, Ethelred was granted extensive territories, which extended on both sides of the Firth of Forth. From these lands, he made substantial gifts to the Church. North of the firth, for example, he gave the lands of Ardmore to the Culdees of Loch Leven “with every freedom, and without any exaction or demand whatever in the world from bishop, king, or earl.” South of the firth, in Midlothian, he founded the church and parish of Hales, giving the lands of Hales to the Church of the Holy Trinity at Dunfermline.”

== Dispute Regarding Earldom of Fife ==
Ethelred was often said to have held the office Mormaer (Earl) of Fife, but this is now disputed. The source of the confusion was the Gaelic notitia of a grant to the Céli Dé (Culdee) monks of Loch Leven, later translated into Latin and incorporated in the Register of the Priory of St Andrews. The grant, dated between 1093 and 1107, begins with the words, “Edelradus vir venerandae memoriae filius Malcolmi Regis Scotiae, Abbas de Dunkeldense et insuper Comes de Fyf.” Translated, this is "Ethelred, man of venerable memory, son of King Máel Coluim of Scotland, Abbot of Dunkeld and Mormaer of Fife." Sir James Dalrymple theorized that the phrase "comes de fyfe" referred not to the title of Earl, but to the area where the lands were situated, a slip made by a monk working with the manuscripts.

John Bannerman offers a different explanation. He noted that the notitia in the Register records several witnesses, among whom were Ethelred's brothers David and Alexander, as well as a witness identified as Constantinus Comes de Fyf (Causantín, Earl of Fife). Causantín, not Ethelred, was earl of Fife at that time. Bannerman argues that the translator was thrown off by the use of a singular Gaelic verb for a joint grant (i.e., where the verb had two subjects), common in Gaelic charters. As a result, the translator omitted the mormaer, Causantín.

== Abthainries ==
Medieval Scotland had only three abthainries, lands held of the king by an abbot: Dull, Kilmichael, and Madderty. Scottish historian William Forbes Skene has argued that these abthainries were first created for Ethelred by his brother King Edgar. They reverted to the crown at Ethelred's death.

== Death and burial ==
Lockhart, citing Andrew of Wyntoun (c. 1350 – c. 1425), stated that Ethelred was with his mother, Margaret, at Edinburgh Castle as she was dying. Shortly after hearing the news of the deaths of her husband and son Edward at Alnwick, she died. “After her death, and during the so-called usurpation of Donalbane, he [Ethelred] conveyed her lifeless body secretly out of the western gate of the castle, taking, as is said, the advantage of a fog, on to Dunfermline, and in all probability he died soon afterwards, and was buried not at St Andrews, as some seem to say, but at Dunfermline, in the same resting-place where the bodies of his father and mother and eldest brother were laid.”

In his metrical chronicle, Andrew of Wyntoun narrated those events, thus:

Hyr swne Ethelrede, quene thys felle
That wes hys modyr nere than by
Gert at the west yhet prewaly
Have the cors forth in a myst
Or mony of hyr endying wyst;
And wyth that body thai past syne
But ony lat til Dwnfermelyne.
Before the Rwde Awtare wyth honoure
She was laid in Haly Sepulture.

== Bibliography ==
- Bannerman, John, "MacDuff of Fife," in A. Grant & K.Stringer (eds.) Medieval Scotland: Crown, Lordship and Community, Essays Presented to G.W.S. Barrow, (Edinburgh, 1993), pp. 20–38
- Dalrymple, David (1776). History of Scotland from the Accession of Malcolm III Surnamed Canmore to the Accession of Robert I. Edinburgh. pp. 42–43.
- Grant, A.; Stringer, K., eds. (1993). Medieval Scotland: Crown, Lordship and Community, Essays Presented to G.W.S. Barrow. Edinburgh. pp. 20–38.
- Lockhart, William (8 February 1892). "Notices of Ethelred, Earl of Fife, and Abbot of Dunkeld and His Place in the Royal Family of Scotland in the Eleventh Century". Proceedings of the Society of Antiquaries of Scotland. 26: 107.
- Skene, William Forbes (1902). The Highlanders of Scotland, Vol. 2. Stirling: Mackay. pp. 136–37. ISBN 978-1507612651.
