= Saint Margaret of Scotland =

Queen of Scotland from 1070 to 1093

Saint Margaret
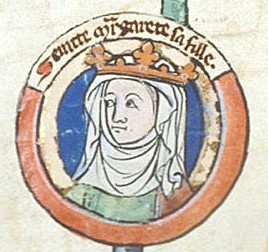
- St Margaret from a medieval family tree, 13th century

Queen consort of Alba (Scotland)
- Tenure: 1070 – 13 November 1093
- Born: c. 1045; Kingdom of Hungary
- Died: 16 November 1093 (aged 47–48); Edinburgh Castle, Kingdom of Scotland
- Burial: Dunfermline Abbey
- Spouse: Malcolm III of Scotland (m. 1070; died 1093)
- Issue more...: Edmund, Bishop of Dunkeld; Ethelred; Edgar, King of Scotland; Alexander I, King of Scotland; David I, King of Scotland; Matilda, Queen of England; Mary, Countess of Boulogne
- House: Wessex
- Father: Edward the Exile
- Mother: Agatha
- Religion: Catholicism

Saint Margaret of Scotland (Scottish Gaelic: Naomh Maighréad; Scots: Saunt Marget, c. 1045 – 16 November 1093), also known as Margaret of Wessex, was Queen of Alba from 1070 to 1093 as the wife of King Malcolm III. Margaret was sometimes called "The Pearl of Scotland". She was a member of the House of Wessex and was born in the Kingdom of Hungary to the expatriate English prince Edward the Exile. She and her family returned to England in 1057. Following the death of Harold Godwinson at the Battle of Hastings in 1066, her brother Edgar Ætheling was elected King of England but never crowned. After the family fled north, Margaret married Malcolm III of Scotland by the end of 1070.

Margaret was a pious Christian, and among many charitable works she established a ferry across the Firth of Forth in Scotland for pilgrims travelling to St Andrews in Fife, which gave the towns of South Queensferry and North Queensferry their names. Margaret was the mother of three kings of Scotland, or four, if Edmund of Scotland (who ruled with his uncle, Donald III) is counted, and of Matilda of Scotland, queen consort of England. According to the Vita S. Margaritae (Scotorum) Reginae (Life of St Margaret, Queen (of the Scots)), attributed to Turgot of Durham, Margaret died at Edinburgh Castle in 1093, days after receiving the news of her husband and son's deaths in battle.

In 1250, Pope Innocent IV canonised Margaret, and her remains were reinterred in a shrine in Dunfermline Abbey in Fife. Her relics were dispersed after the Scottish Reformation and subsequently lost. Mary, Queen of Scots, at one time owned her head, which was subsequently preserved by Jesuits in the Scots College, Douai, France, from where it was lost during the French Revolution.

== Early life ==
Margaret was the daughter of the English prince Edward the Exile and his wife Agatha, and also the granddaughter of Edmund Ironside, King of England. After the death of Ironside in 1016, Canute sent the infant Edward and his brother to the court of the Swedish king, Olof Skötkonung, and they eventually made their way to Kievan Rus'. The provenance of Margaret's mother, Agatha, is disputed.

As an adult, Edward travelled to Hungary. In 1046 he supported the successful bid of King Andrew I for the Hungarian crown. Margaret was born in Hungary about 1045. Her brother Edgar Ætheling and sister Cristina were also born in Hungary around this time. Margaret grew up in a very religious environment in the Hungarian court.

== Return to England ==
Margaret came to England with the rest of her family when her father, Edward the Exile, was recalled in 1057 as a possible successor to her great-uncle, the childless King Edward the Confessor. Whether from natural or sinister causes, her father died immediately after landing, and Margaret, still a child, continued to reside at the English court where her brother, Edgar Ætheling, was considered a possible successor to the English throne. When Edward the Confessor died in January 1066, Harold Godwinson was selected as king, possibly because Edgar was considered too young. After Harold's defeat at the Battle of Hastings later that year, Edgar was proclaimed King of England, but when the Normans advanced on London, the Witenagemot presented Edgar to William the Conqueror, who took him to Normandy before returning him to England in 1068, when Edgar, Margaret, Cristina, and their mother Agatha fled north to Northumbria, England.

== Journey to Scotland ==
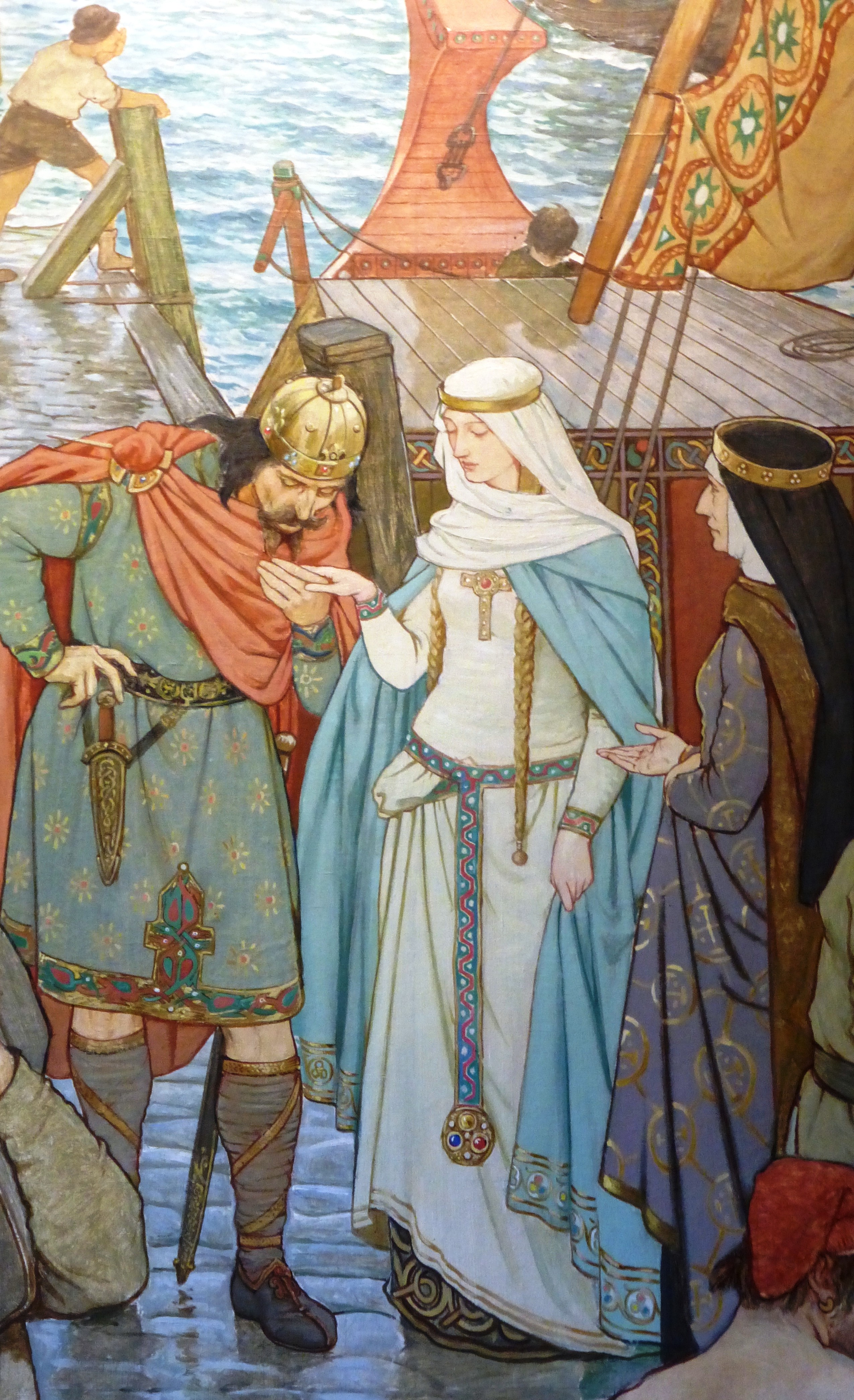
Malcolm greeting Margaret on her arrival in Scotland; detail of a mural (circa 1898) in the Scottish National Portrait Gallery by William Hole

According to tradition, the widowed Agatha decided to leave Northumbria with her children and return to the continent. However, a storm drove their ship north to the Kingdom of Scotland, where they were shipwrecked in 1068. There they were given refuge by King Malcolm III. Margaret's arrival in Scotland, after the failed revolt of the Northumbrian earls, has been heavily romanticised, though one medieval source suggested that she and Malcolm were first engaged nine years earlier. That is, according to Orderic Vitalis, one of Malcolm's earliest actions as king was to travel to the court of Edward the Confessor, in 1059 to arrange a marriage with "Edward's kinswoman Margaret, who had arrived in England two years before from Hungary". If a marriage agreement was made in 1059, it was not kept, and this may explain the Scots invasion of Northumbria in 1061 when Lindisfarne was plundered. Conversely, Symeon of Durham implied that Margaret's first meeting with Malcolm III may not have been until 1070, after William the Conqueror's Harrying of the North.

Malcolm III was a widower, with two sons, Donald and Duncan, and would have been attracted to marrying one of the few remaining members of the House of Wessex, the Anglo-Saxon royal family. The marriage of Malcolm and Margaret occurred in 1070. Subsequently, Malcolm executed several invasions of Northumbria to support the claim of his new brother-in-law Edgar and to increase his own power. These, however, had little effect save the devastation of the county.

== Issue ==
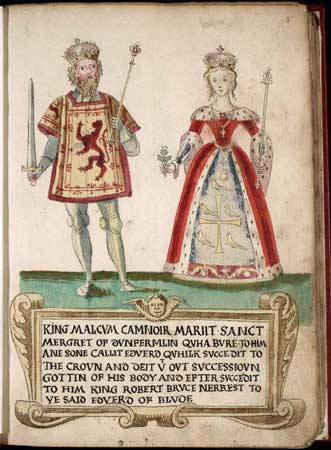
Malcolm and Margaret from the Forman Armorial (1562)

Margaret and Malcolm had eight children – six sons and two daughters:

1. Edward (c. 1071 – 13 November 1093), killed along with his father in the Battle of Alnwick
2. Edmund (c. 1071 – post-1097)
3. Ethelred, abbot of Dunkeld, Perth and Kinross, Scotland
4. Edgar (c. 1074 – 11 January 1107), king of Scotland, reigned 1097–1107
5. Alexander I (c. 1078 – 23 April 1124), King of Scotland, reigned 1107–24
6. Edith (c. 1080 – 1 May 1118), renamed Matilda, queen of England
7. Mary (1082–1116), countess of Boulogne
8. David I (c. 1084 – 24 May 1153), king of Scotland, reigned 1124–53

== Piety ==
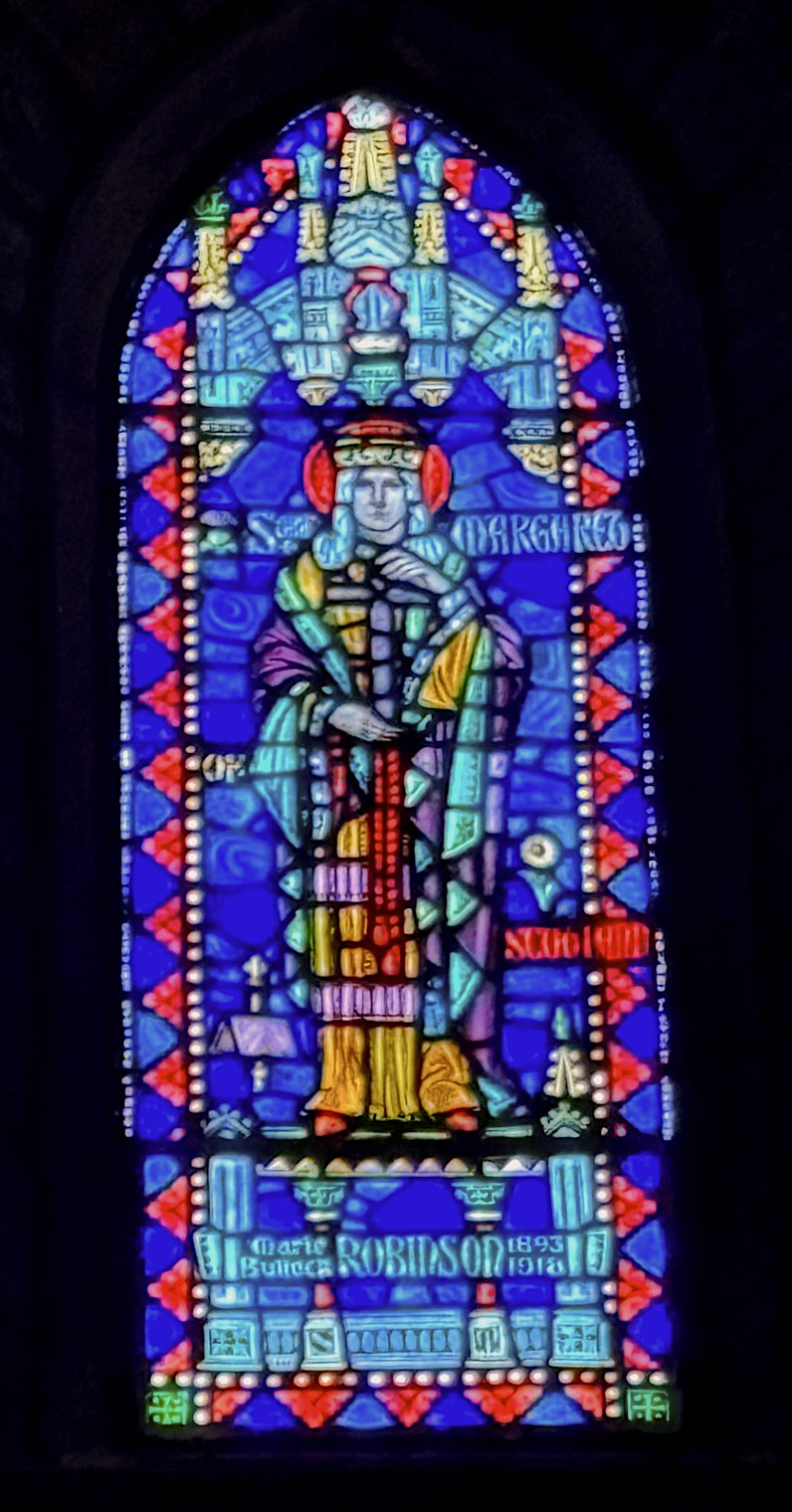
Stained glass window showing St. Margaret of Scotland at Church of the Good Shepherd (Rosemont, Pennsylvania)

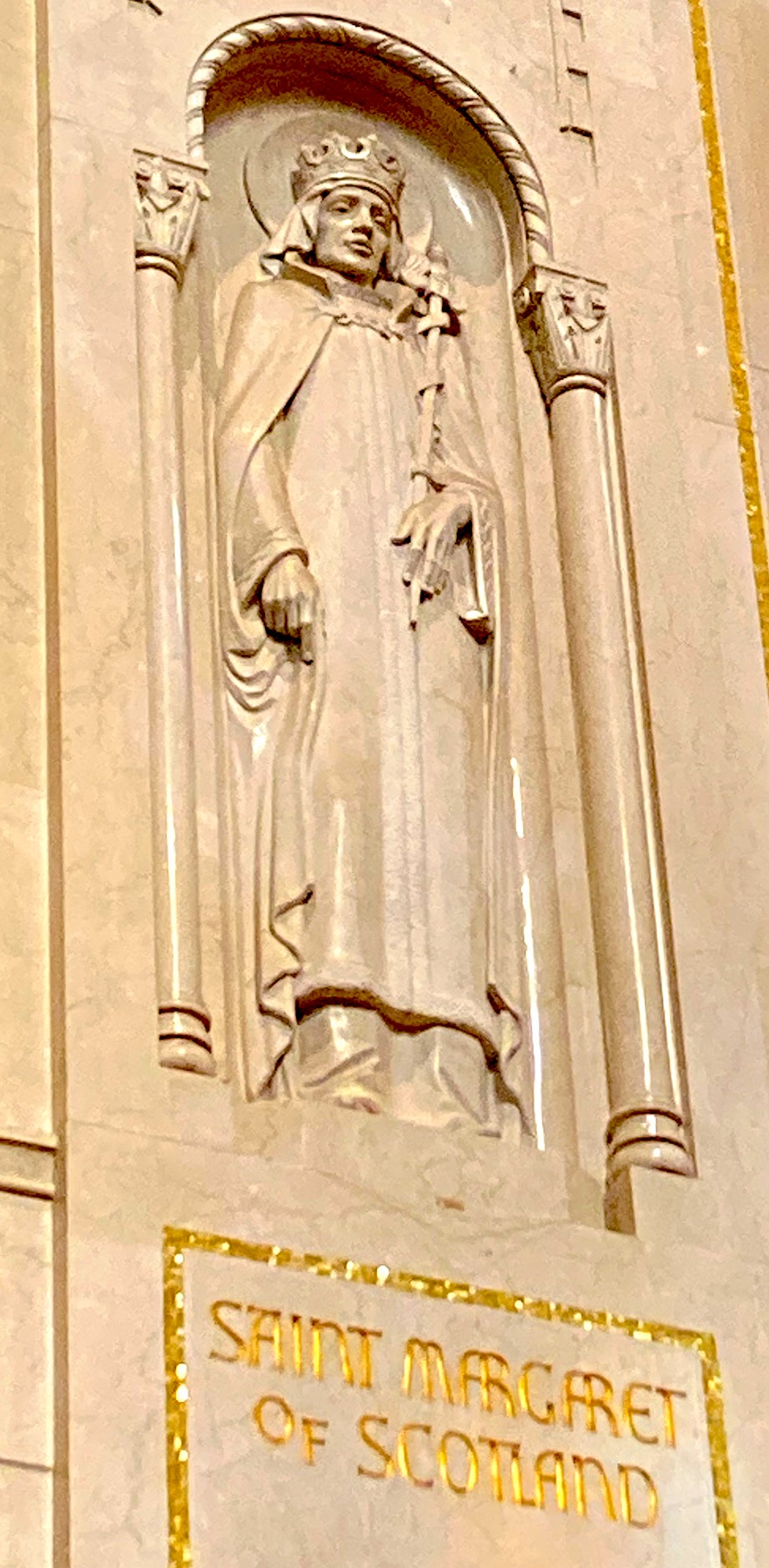
Relief sculpture of St Margaret of Scotland, Basilica of the National Shrine of the Immaculate Conception, Washington, D.C.

Turgot of Durham, Bishop of St Andrews, became close to the Scottish court and a friend and spiritual adviser to Margaret.*Green, Lionel (July 2013). Hopkins, Peter (ed.). Building St Cuthbert's Shrine Durham Cathedral and the Life of Prior Turgot. Sacristy Press. p. 90. ISBN 9781908381620. Between 1100 and 1107, Turgot wrote a vita of her at the request of her daughter, Matilda, wife of King Henry I of England. Turgot credits her with having a civilising influence on her husband Malcolm by reading him narratives from the Bible. She instigated religious reform, striving to conform the worship and practices of the Scottish church to those of the continental church, which she experienced in her childhood. This she did on the inspiration and with the guidance of Lanfranc, a future archbishop of Canterbury. Due to these achievements, she was considered an exemplar of the "just ruler", and moreover influenced her husband and children, especially her youngest son, the future King David I of Scotland, to be just and holy rulers.

"The chroniclers all agree in depicting Queen Margaret as a strong, pure, noble character, who had very great influence over her husband, and through him over Scottish history, especially in its ecclesiastical aspects. Her religion, which was genuine and intense, was of the newest Roman style; and to her are attributed a number of reforms by which the Church [in] Scotland was considerably modified from the insular and primitive type which down to her time it had exhibited. Among those expressly mentioned are a change in the manner of observing Lent, which thenceforward began as elsewhere on Ash Wednesday and not as previously on the following Monday, and the abolition of the old practice of observing Saturday (Sabbath), not Sunday, as the day of rest from labour (for more information on this issue see Skene's Celtic Scotland, book ii chap. 8)."

She attended to charitable works, serving orphans and the poor every day before she ate and washing the feet of the poor in imitation of Christ. She rose at midnight each night to attend the liturgy. She invited the Benedictine Order to establish a monastery in Dunfermline, Fife in 1072, and established ferries at Queensferry and North Berwick to assist pilgrims journeying from south of the Firth of Forth to St Andrews in Fife. She used a cave on the banks of the Tower Burn in Dunfermline as a place of devotion and prayer. St Margaret's Cave, now covered beneath a municipal car park, is open to the public. Among other deeds, Margaret also instigated the restoration of Iona Abbey. She is also known to have interceded for the release of fellow English exiles who had been forced into serfdom by the Norman conquest of England.

Margaret was as pious privately as she was publicly. She spent much of her time in prayer, devotional reading, and ecclesiastical embroidery. This apparently had considerable effect on Malcolm, who (with questions of bias) has been portrayed as illiterate: he so admired her piety that he had her books decorated in gold and silver. One of these, a pocket gospel book with portraits of the Evangelists, is in the Bodleian Library in Oxford, England.

Malcolm was largely ignorant of the long-term effects of Margaret's endeavours, not being especially religious himself. He was content for her to pursue her reforms as she desired, which was a testament to the strength of and affection in their marriage.

== Death ==
Margaret's husband, Malcolm, and their eldest son, Edward, were killed in the Battle of Alnwick against Robert de Mowbray, the Norman Earl of Northumbria, on 13 November 1093. Her son, Edgar, was left with the task of informing his mother of their deaths. Not yet 50 years old, Margaret died on 16 November 1093, three days after the deaths of her husband and eldest son. The cause of death was reportedly grief. She was buried before the high altar in Dunfermline Abbey in Fife.

== Veneration ==
Saint Margaret of Scotland
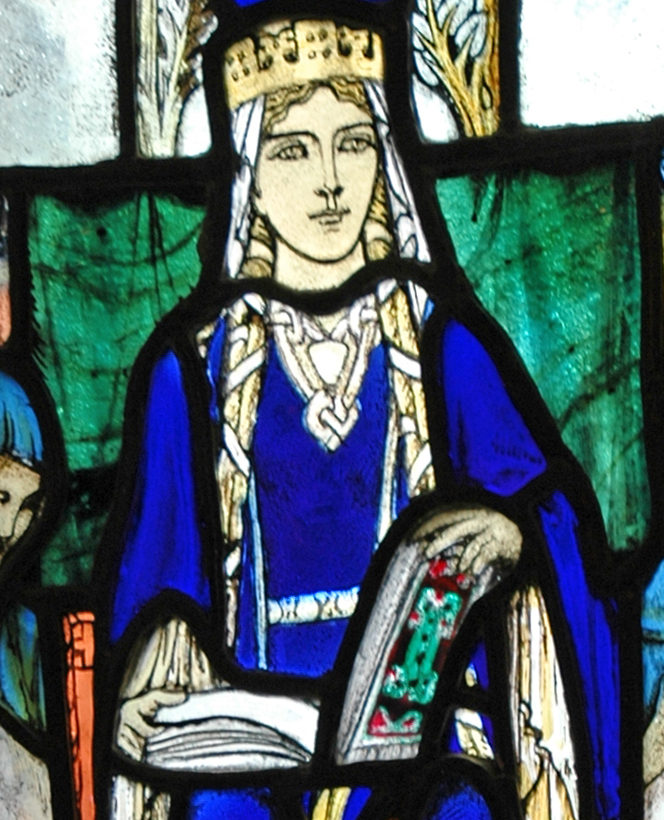
- Saint Margaret in a stained-glass window (1922) by Douglas Strachan in St Margaret's Chapel, Edinburgh
- Born: c. 1045
- Died: 16 November 1093
- Venerated in: Eastern Orthodox Church, Catholic Church, Church of England and Scottish Episcopal Church
- Feast: 16 November, June 10 (Western Rite Orthodoxy)
- Patronage: Scotland, queens, widows

=== Canonisation, feast day and patronages ===
Literature attesting to Margaret's miraculous intercession built up over time, much of it written about by the monks of Dunfermline. Pope Innocent IV canonised Margaret in 1250 in recognition of her personal holiness, fidelity to the Roman Catholic Church, work for ecclesiastical reform, and charity. On 19 June 1250, after her canonisation, her remains were transferred to a chapel in Dunfermline's eastern apse.

Amid the Protestant Reformation in Scotland and growing iconoclasm, the bodies of Margaret and Malcolm were removed from Dunfermline by its Abbot, George Durie to Durie's rural estate at Craigluscar. In 1560, Mary, Queen of Scots had Margaret's head removed to Edinburgh Castle as a relic to assist her in childbirth. In 1597, Margaret's head ended up with the Jesuits at the Scots College, Douai, France, but it was lost during the French Revolution. By 1580 Philip II of Spain had the other remains of Margaret and Malcolm III transferred to the royal monastery, El Escorial, near Madrid, Spain, but their present location has not been discovered.

In 1693 Pope Innocent XII moved her feast day to 10 June in recognition of the birthdate of James Francis Edward Stuart, the Jacobite successor of deposed Catholic monarch James VII of Scotland and II of England.

The 1916 English-language edition Roman Martyrology authorized by James Cardinal Gibbons marks 10 June for "St. Margaret, queen, celebrated for her love of the poor and of voluntary poverty."

In the revision of the General Roman Calendar in 1969, 16 November became free and the Church transferred her feast day to 16 November, the date of her death, on which it always had been observed in Scotland. The most recent Roman Martyrology (as of 2004) commemorates the day as:

Saint Margaret, who was born in Hungary and married to Malcolm the Great, King of Scotland, gave birth to eight sons and was greatly concerned about the good of the kingdom and the Church, combining prayer and fasting with generosity towards the poor, thus providing an example of an excellent wife, mother and queen.

Some traditionalist Catholics continue to celebrate her feast day on 10 June.

She is also venerated as a saint in the Anglican Communion. Margaret is honoured in the Church of England, the Scottish Episcopal Church and in the Calendar of the Episcopal Church (United States) on 16 November.

=== Institutions bearing her name ===
Several churches throughout the world are dedicated in honour of St Margaret. One of the oldest is St Margaret's Chapel in Edinburgh Castle, which her son King David I founded. The Chapel was long thought to have been the oratory of Margaret herself, but is now thought to have been established in the 12th century. The oldest edifice in Edinburgh, it was restored in the 19th century and refurbished in the 1990s.

== Arms ==
Coat of arms of Saint Margaret of Scotland
Notes The arms attributed to Margaret are anachronistic in that heraldic traditions did not exist the eleventh century. The arms were published in the 1542 Register of Scottish Arms (commonly known as the Lindsay Armorial), by Sir David Lindsay of the Mount, Lord Lyon King of Arms. Later published in an 1822 facsimile edition. The arms of an unmarried woman or a widow (which applies to Margaret in her post-1093 posthumous depictions as a saint) are traditionally presented on a lozenge. Margaret's arms are similar to those of great uncle Edward the Confessor. Escutcheon Or, a lion rampant Gules armed and langued Azure within a double tressure flory-counter-flory of the second, impaling Azure, a cross flory between four martlets Or; the shield ensigned of an Imperial Crown proper.

== Gallery ==
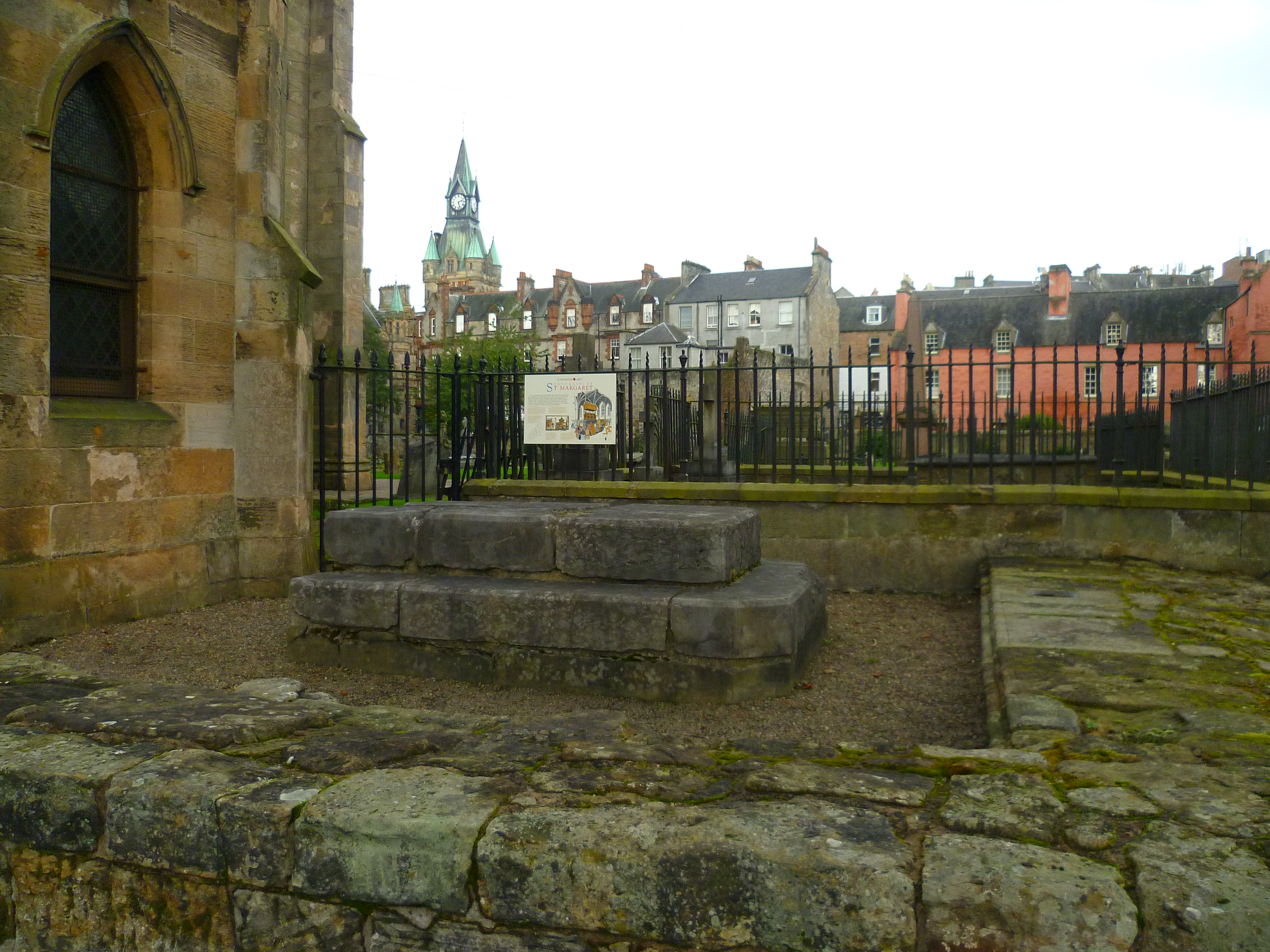
Site of the ruined Shrine of St Margaret at Dunfermline Abbey, Fife, Scotland

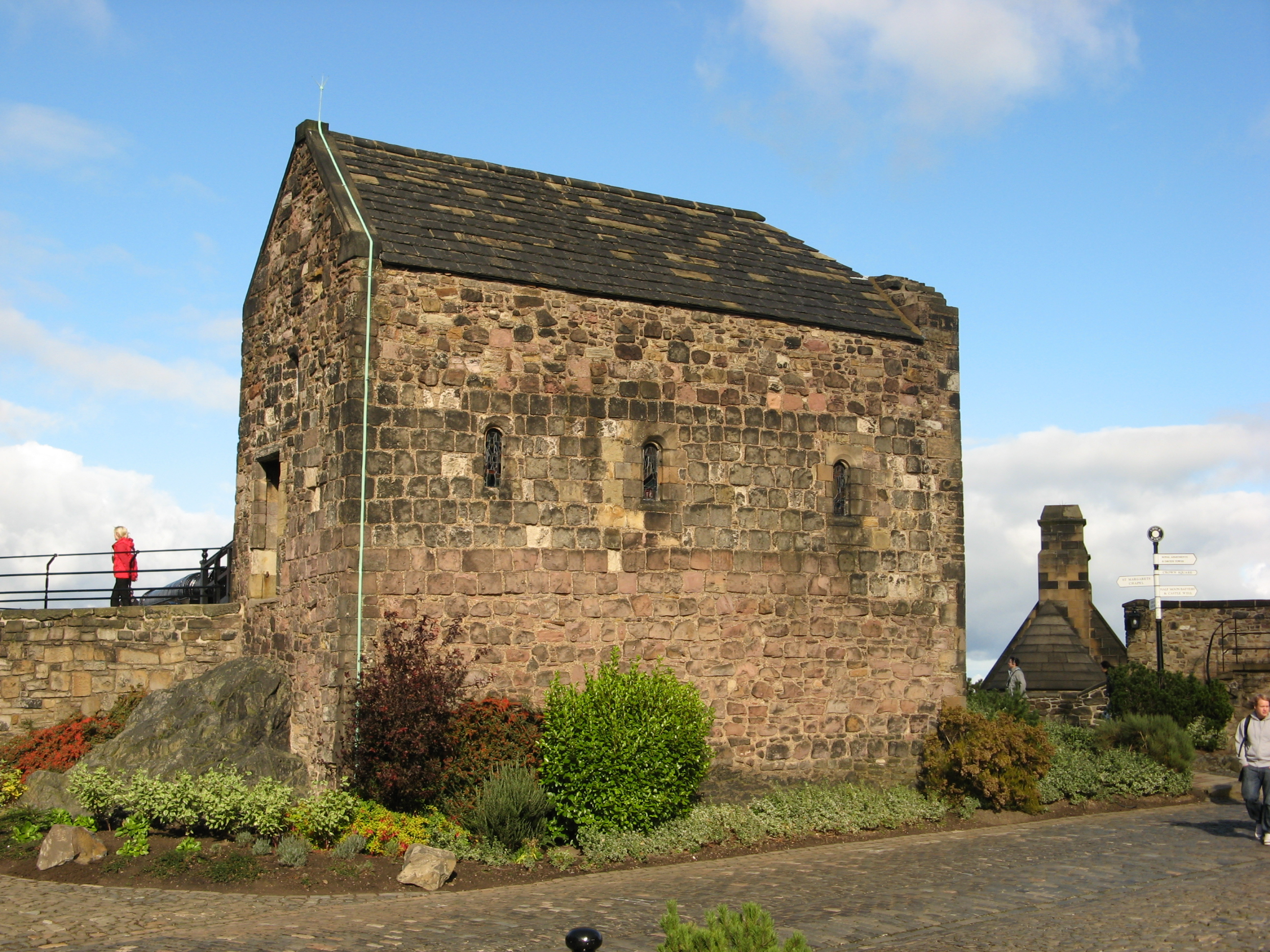
St Margaret's Chapel in Edinburgh Castle

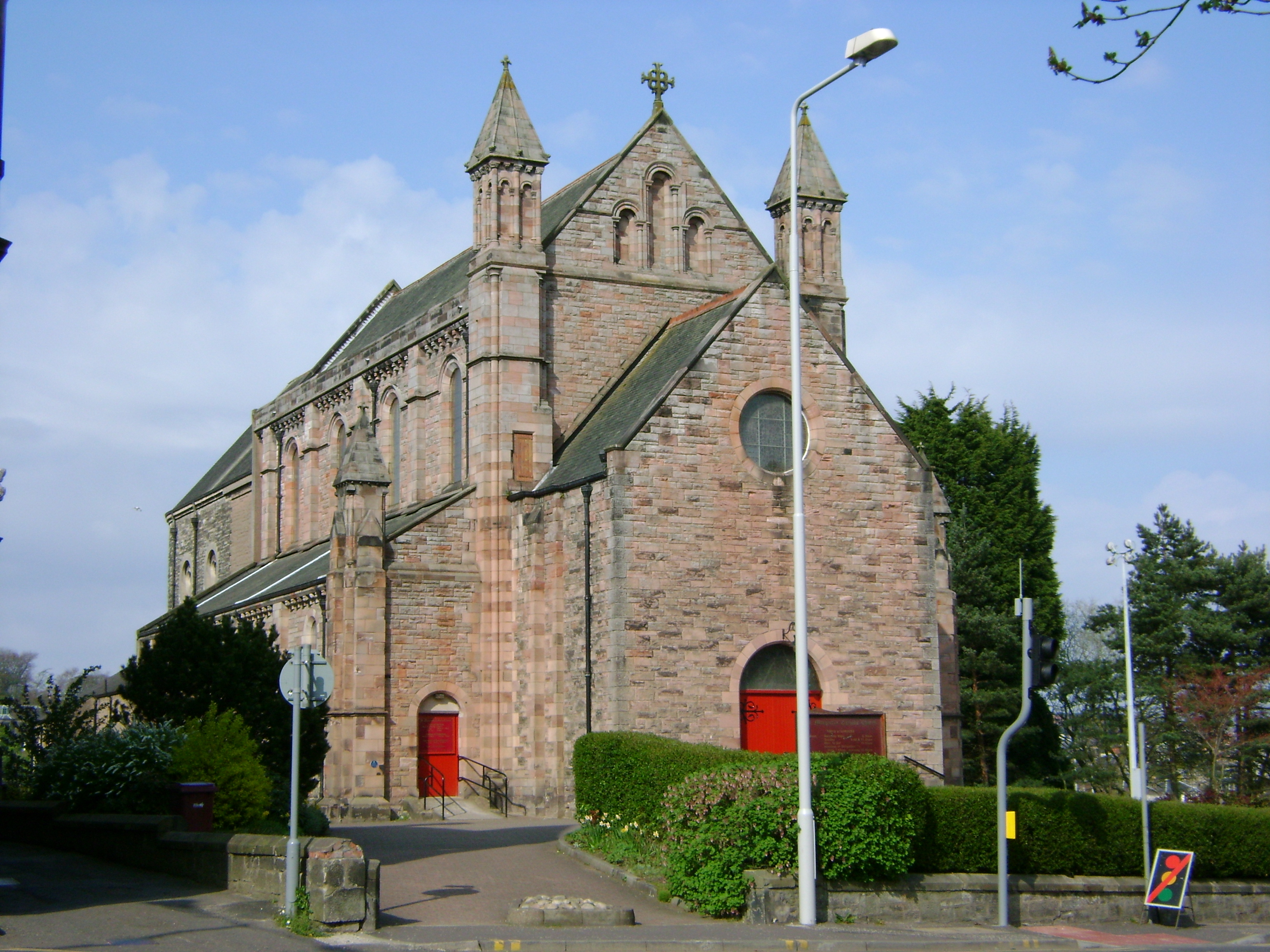
St Margaret's Church in Dunfermline

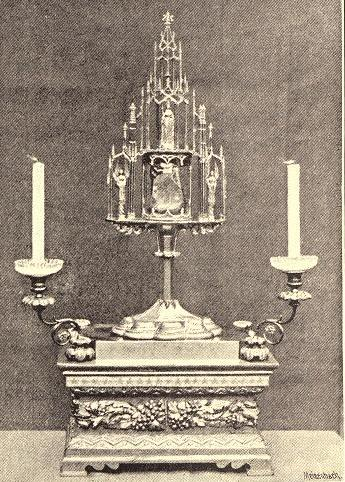
1897 picture of the St Margaret reliquary in St Margaret's Convent in Edinburgh

== See also ==
- List of Catholic saints
- List of Scottish consorts
- Mecseknádasd, Hungary
- Queen Margaret College (Glasgow), former college that merged with Glasgow University
- Queen Margaret Union, student union at Glasgow University
- Saint Margaret of Scotland Anglican Episcopal Church, Hungary
- Saint Margaret of Scotland, patron saint archive
