= Mary of Scotland, Countess of Boulogne =

Countess consort of Boulogne

Mary of Scotland
- Born: 1082
- Died: 1116 (aged 33–34)
- Spouse: Eustace III, Count of Boulogne
- Issue: Matilda, Queen of England
- House: Dunkeld
- Father: Malcolm III of Scotland
- Mother: Margaret of Wessex

Mary of Scotland (1082–1116) was the younger daughter of Malcolm III of Scotland and his second wife, Margaret of Wessex. Mary was a member of the House of Dunkeld by birth and Countess of Boulogne by marriage.

== Life ==
In 1086, Mary and her sister, Matilda, were sent by their parents to Romsey Abbey. Their maternal aunt, Christina, was abbess there. The girls spent their early years at the monastery, where they also received part of their education. Some time before 1093, they went to Wilton Abbey, which also had a reputation as a centre of learning, to finish their education. Matilda received many proposals for marriage but refused them all for the time being.

Matilda finally left the monastery in 1100 to marry King Henry I of England. The marriage was controversial because it was not clear whether the girls had been veiled as nuns. Mary herself had left the abbey in 1096. Matilda wanted her to marry as well, so Henry I arranged a match with Eustace III, Count of Boulogne. The couple had a daughter, Matilda, who succeeded Eustace and later became Queen of England.

Mary died in 1116, nine years before her husband. She was buried at the Cluniac abbey at Bermondsey.
