= Matilda of Scotland =

Queen of England from 1100 to 1118

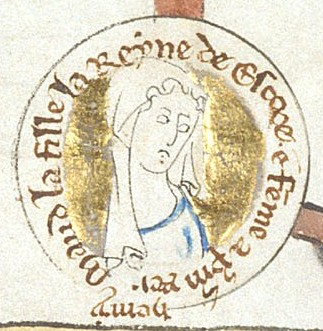
- 13th century depiction on a family tree

Queen consort of England
- Tenure: 1100 – 1118
- Coronation: 11 November 1100
- Born: Edith; 1080; Dunfermline, Scotland
- Died: 1 May 1118 (aged 37–38); Westminster Palace, London, England
- Burial: Westminster Abbey
- Spouse: Henry I of England (m. 1100)
- Issue: Matilda, Holy Roman Empress; William Adelin, Duke of Normandy
- House: Dunkeld
- Father: Malcolm III of Scotland
- Mother: Margaret of Wessex

Matilda of Scotland (originally christened Edith, (Note: She is known to have been given the name "Edith" (the Old English Eadgyth, meaning "Fortune-Battle") at birth, and was baptised under that name. She is known to have been crowned under a name favoured by the Normans, "Matilda" (from the Germanic Mahthilda, meaning "Might-Battle"), and was referred to as such throughout her husband's reign. Historians generally refer to her as "Matilda of Scotland"; in popular usage, she is referred to equally as "Matilda" or "Maud".) 1080 – 1 May 1118), also known as Good Queen Maud, was Queen of England and Duchess of Normandy as the first wife of King Henry I. She acted as regent of England on several occasions during Henry's absences: in 1104, 1107, 1108, and 1111.

Daughter of King Malcolm III of Scotland and the Anglo-Saxon princess Margaret of Wessex, Matilda was educated at a convent in southern England, where her aunt Christina was abbess and forced her to wear a veil. In 1093, Matilda was engaged to an English nobleman until her father and her brother Edward were killed in the Battle of Alnwick in 1093. Her uncle Donald III seized the throne of Scotland, triggering a messy succession conflict. England opposed King Donald and supported first her half-brother Duncan II as king of Scotland, and after his death, her brother Edgar, who assumed the throne in 1097.

Henry I succeeded his brother William Rufus as king of England in 1100 and quickly proposed marriage to Matilda due to her descent from the Anglo-Saxon House of Wessex, which would help legitimize his rule. After proving she had not taken religious vows, Matilda and Henry were married. As Queen of England, Matilda embarked on several building projects for transportation and health, took a role in government as mediator to the Church, and led a literary court. She acted as regent when her husband was away, with many surviving charters signed by her. Matilda and Henry had two children: Empress Matilda and William Adelin; through her daughter, she is the ancestor of all subsequent English and British monarchs. Queen Matilda was buried in Westminster Abbey and was fondly remembered by her subjects. There was an attempt to have her canonised as a saint in the Catholic Church, which was not pursued.

== Early life ==
=== Childhood ===
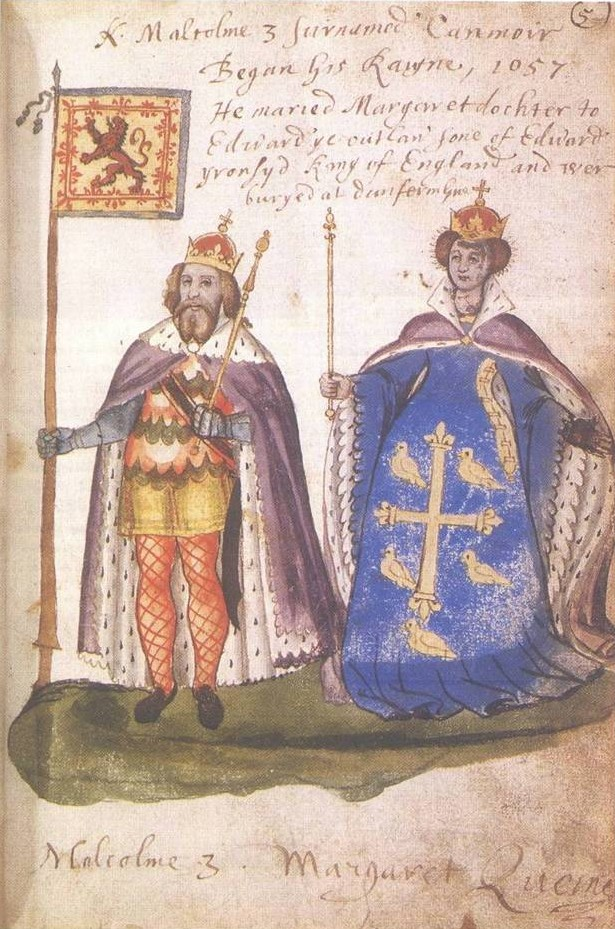
Depiction of Matilda's parents from the Seton Armorial, c. 1591

Born in 1080, in Dunfermline, Scotland, Matilda's parents were King Malcolm III and Margaret of Wessex. She was therefore a descendant of both the Scottish and the Anglo-Saxon royal families, great-granddaughter of Edmund Ironside and descended from Alfred the Great. The Scottish princess was christened Edith. Present at the baptismal font were Robert Curthose standing as her godfather, and the English queen Matilda of Flanders as her godmother. The infant Edith pulled at Matilda's headdress, which was seen as an omen that the child would one day be a queen.

Edith and her siblings were raised by a loving but strict mother who did not spare the rod when it came to raising her children in virtue, and instilled in her offspring the importance of piety. When about six years old, Edith and her younger sister Mary were sent to be educated at Romsey Abbey, in southern England, where their maternal aunt Christina was abbess. Their studies went beyond the standard feminine pursuits of the time, which was not surprising since their mother was a great lover of books. The princesses learned the English, French, and Latin languages, enabling them to read St. Augustine's works and the Bible. It is presumed Edith learned financial management and geometry as well.

=== Succession crisis ===
During her stay at Romsey and later at Wilton Abbey, the still 13-year-old Edith was much sought after as a bride, with Hériman of Tournai claiming that even King William II of England considered marrying her. She refused proposals from William de Warenne, 2nd Earl of Surrey, and Alan Rufus, Lord of Richmond. However, her parents betrothed Edith to the latter in 1093. Before the marriage could take place, both her father and older brother Edward were killed at the Battle of Alnwick in November 1093. Upon hearing of the death of both her husband and her son, Queen Margaret died on 16 November. Edith's paternal uncle Donald III claimed the throne of Scotland, and her surviving brothers, Edgar, Alexander, and David, were sent to England to the court of King William II for safety. Shortly afterwards, the orphan princess was abandoned by her betrothed, who eloped with Gunhild of Wessex, a daughter of Harold Godwinson. Alan Rufus died, however, before marrying Gunhild.

Around this time, possibly due to the succession conflict in Scotland between her uncle Donald III, her half-brother Duncan II and her brother Edgar, Edith left the monastery. In 1093, Archbishop Anselm of Canterbury wrote to the Bishop of Salisbury, ordering that "the daughter of the late King of Scotland be returned to the monastery that she had left". Edith did not return to Wilton, however, and is largely unaccounted for in chronicles until 1100. As her home in Scotland was held by her uncle, it is possible, likely even, that Edith joined her brothers at the English court of William Rufus, who supported her brother Edgar in assuming the throne of Scotland in 1097.

== Problematic engagement ==
Cristina of Wessex, the aunt and abbess who forced Edith to wear a nun's veil

After William II's death in the New Forest in August 1100, his brother Henry immediately seized the royal treasury and crown. He was manipulative and profoundly clever, known for his strict but proper government and utterly merciless nature in case of war or rebellion. His next task was to marry and his choice was Edith, whom he had known for some time. William of Malmesbury stated that Henry had "long been attached" to her, Orderic Vitalis said that Henry had "long adored" her character and capacity. Some sources add that she was "not bad looking" despite that she did not improve her appearance through face painting. It is possible that Edith spent time at William Rufus's court, along with her brothers, and that the pair had met there, but Henry could have been introduced to her by his teacher Bishop Osmund.

Henry had been born in England, but a bride with ties to the ancient Wessex line would increase his popularity with the English and help to reconcile the Normans and Anglo-Saxons. Edith was a great-granddaughter of Edmund Ironside from the royal family of Wessex, in their heirs, the two factions would be united, further unifying the new regime. Another benefit was that England and Scotland became politically closer; three of her brothers became kings of Scotland in succession and were unusually friendly towards England: Alexander I married Sybilla, one of Henry I's illegitimate daughters, and David I lived at Henry's court for some time before his accession.

Because Edith had spent much of her life in a convent, there was some controversy over whether she was a nun and thus canonically ineligible for marriage. During her time at Romsey Abbey, her aunt Christina forced her to wear a veil. Strong-willed, Edith was ready to fight for her status as a marriageable woman rather than staying in a monastery, despite the fact that her aunt insisted she "was a veiled nun, and that it would be an act of sacrilege to remove her from her convent." When Archbishop Anselm of Canterbury returned to England after a long exile, she sought him out to convince him that she had never been a nun. In fact, she had not only been forced to wear a veil, but her father had "ripped off the offensive headdress [...] and tore it to shreds" at sight of her being veiled.

Professing himself unwilling to decide so weighty a matter on his own, Anselm called a council of bishops in order to determine the canonical legality of the proposed marriage and ordered two inquiries at Wilton to get first-hand information on the matter. Edith testified that she had never taken holy vows, insisting that her parents had sent her to England for educational purposes and her aunt had veiled her to protect her "from the lust of the Normans," but she had pulled the veil off and stamped on it, which made her aunt beat and scold her. The council concluded that Edith was not a nun, she never had been, and her parents had not intended that she become one, giving their permission for the marriage.

== Queen of England ==
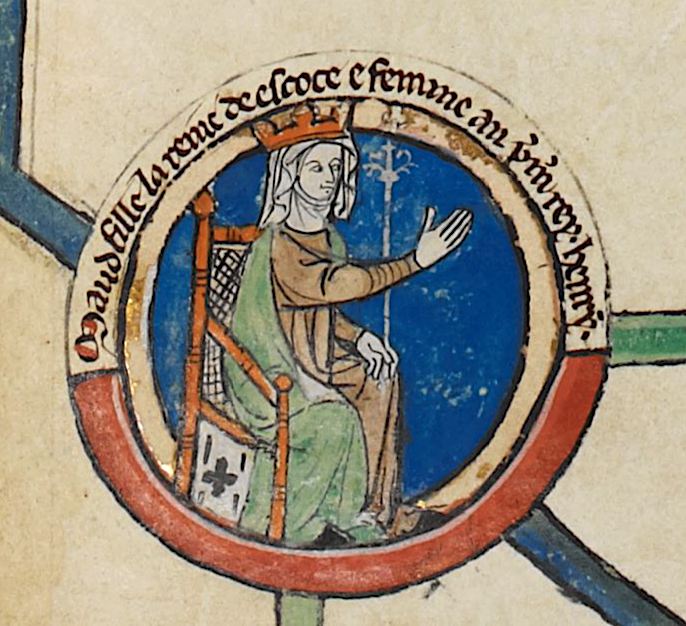
Depiction of Queen Matilda in a family tree

Edith and Henry were married on 11 November 1100 at Westminster Abbey by Archbishop Anselm of Canterbury. At the end of the ceremony, Edith was crowned and took the regnal name of "Matilda", a hallowed Norman name. The exact reason for the name change remains unclear, though historians suspect she did it in an attempt to please her Norman subjects and husband. By courtiers, however, she and her husband were soon nicknamed 'Godric and Godiva', two typical English names from before the Norman conquest of England in derision of their more rustic style, especially when compared to William II's flamboyance. Despite this, Matilda's court at Westminster was filled with poets. She was known as a patron of the arts, especially music.

=== Regency and diplomacy ===
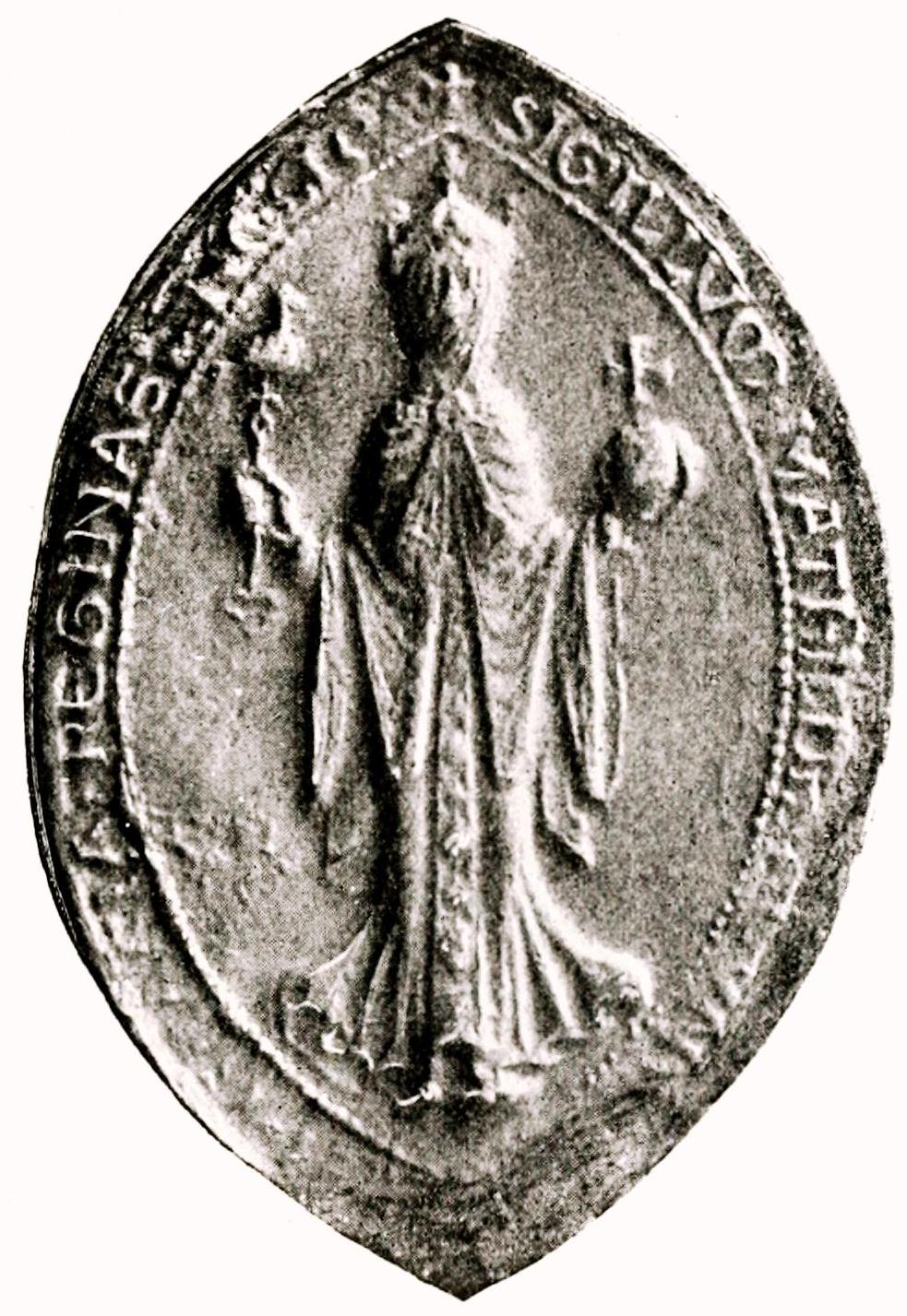
Seal of Queen Matilda

Acting as regent of England during her husband's frequent absences for military campaigns in Normandy and France, Queen Matilda was the designated head of King Henry's court. She went on travels around England and probably visited Normandy in 1106–1107.

During the English investiture controversy of 1103–1107, Matilda acted as intercessor between King Henry and Archbishop Anselm. She wrote several letters during Anselm's absence, first asking him for advice and to return, but later increasingly to mediate. With the Queen's help, the issue was resolved through a compromise solution in 1105: the King gave up the right to pick and invest his own bishops, but the Church agreed that he could receive homage from the bishops for the temporal lands the Church held in his domains.

=== Building projects ===
Matilda had a small dower but it did incorporate lordship rights, which allowed her to administer her properties. Most of her dower estates were granted from lands previously held by Edith of Wessex. Additionally, King Henry made numerous grants to the Queen, including substantial property in London, a political move made in order to win over the unruly Londoners who were vehement supporters of the Wessex Kings.

Matilda had a great interest in architecture and used her considerable income to instigate the construction of many Norman-style buildings, including Waltham Abbey and Holy Trinity Aldgate. After her retinue encountered problems crossing the River Lea to get to Barking Abbey, the Queen built the first arched bridge in England at Stratford-le-Bow, with a causeway across the marshes.

Like her mother, Matilda was renowned for her devotion to the poor, building public lavatories at Queenhithe and a bathhouse with piped-in water. She exhibited a particular interest in leprosy, founding at least two leper hospitals, including the institution that later became the parish church of St Giles-in-the-Fields.

=== Marriage negotiations with Henry V ===
In late 1108 or early 1109, King Henry V of Germany sent envoys to Henry I proposing a marriage alliance between himself and the King's daughter Matilda. He also wrote separately to Queen Matilda on the same matter. The match was attractive to the English king: by marrying his daughter to one of the most prestigious monarchs in Europe, it would reaffirm his own, slightly dubious, status as the youngest son of a new royal house, and it would gain him an ally in his conflicts with France. In return, Henry V would receive a dowry of 10,000 marks to fund his expedition to Rome for his coronation as the Holy Roman emperor. The final details of the deal were hammered out at Westminster in June 1109, and Matilda left England in February 1110 to travel to Germany in preparation for her marriage.

=== Piety ===
Queen Matilda was described as "a woman of exceptional holiness, in piety her mother's rival, and in her own character exempt from all evil influence." She was remembered by her subjects as Mathilda bona regina and for a time sainthood was sought for her, though she was never canonized.

Matilda was known for her generosity towards the church, founding and supporting cloisters and hospitals for leprosies. Malmesbury described her as attending church barefoot at Lent, as well as washing the feet and kissing the hands of the sick. Queen Matilda was patroness of the monk Bendeit's version of The Voyage of Saint Brendan, written around 1106–1118. She also commissioned the monk Thurgot of Durham to write a biography of her mother, Saint Margaret.

== Issue ==
While Henry had numerous illegitimate children by various mistresses, he and Matilda had two children who reached adulthood:

- Matilda (7 February 1102 – 10 September 1167)
- William Adelin (5 August 1103 – 25 November 1120)

The couple may have also had a stillborn child in July 1101. Some historians, such as Chibnall, have argued there was no pregnancy before the one with Empress Matilda "as it allows no time for a normal second pregnancy". Through Matilda, the post-Norman Conquest English monarchs were related to the Anglo-Saxon House of Wessex monarchs.

== Death ==
On 1 May 1118, Matilda died at Westminster Palace. Allegedly, three of her Anglo-Saxon ladies-in-waiting were so distraught by the Queen's death that they immediately became nuns. She would have liked to have been buried at Holy Trinity, Aldgate, but King Henry asked for her to be buried at Westminster Abbey near Edward the Confessor. The inscription on her tomb reads: "Here lies the renowned queen Matilda the second, excelling both young and old of her day. She was for everyone the benchmark of morals and the ornament of life."

The death of Matilda's son, William Adelin, in the disaster of the White Ship (November 1120) and her widower's failure to produce a legitimate son from his second marriage led to the succession crisis and, as a consequence, a long civil war. During his reign, Stephen of Blois insisted that Queen Matilda had in fact been a nun and that her daughter, Empress Matilda, was therefore not a legitimate successor to the English throne.

Queen Matilda's reputation considerably improved throughout the reign of her grandson Henry II, but she was remembered to a continuously lesser extent between the late 13th and 14th centuries.

== Sources ==
- Margot, Arnold (1993). Queen Consorts of England: the Power Behind the Throne. Facts on File. ISBN 0816029008.
- Chibnall, Marjorie (1991). The Empress Matilda: Queen Consort, Queen Mother, and Lady of the English. Oxford, UK Cambridge, Mass: Blackwell. ISBN 9780631157373. OCLC 29924153.
- Green, Judith (2006). Henry I : King of England and Duke of Normandy. Cambridge: Cambridge University Press. ISBN 9780521591317. OCLC 61757059.
- Hilton, Lisa (2010). Queens Consort: England's Medieval Queens from Eleanor of Aquitaine to Elizabeth of York. New York, NY: Pegasus Books LLC. ISBN 9781605981055. OCLC 649718519.
- Hollister, C. Warren (2001). Frost, Amanda Clark (ed.). Henry I. New Haven: Yale University Press. ISBN 9780300143720. OCLC 907375996.
- Huneycutt, Lois L. (2003). Matilda of Scotland: A Study in Medieval Queenship. Rochester, NY: Boydell Press. ISBN 9781846151149. OCLC 229990725.
- Leyser, Karl (1982). Medieval Germany and Its Neighbours, 900–1250. London, UK: Hambledon Press. ISBN 9780631157373.
- Ritchie, R. L. Græme (1950). "The Date of the "Voyage of St Brendan"". Medium Ævum. 19. Oxford, UK: Society for the Study of Medieval Languages and Literature: 64–66. doi:10.2307/43626381. ISSN 0025-8385. JSTOR 43626381. OCLC 7787819373.
- Strickland, Agnes; Strickland, Elisabeth (1852). Lives of the Queens of England From the Norman Conquest. Lea and Blanchard. ISBN 0342001302.
- Turgot (1884). Life of St. Margaret Queen of Scotland. Translated by Forbes-Leith, William. Edinburgh: W. Paterson. OCLC 697981344.
- Tyler, Elizabeth Muir (2017). "Edith Becomes Matilda". England in Europe : English Royal Women and Literary Patronage, c. 1000–c. 1150. Toronto, Canada; Buffalo, New York; London, UK: University of Toronto Press. pp. 302–353. ISBN 9781442685956. JSTOR 10.3138/j.ctt1whm96v.14. OCLC 984991708.
- Weir, Alison (2017). Queens of the Conquest: England's Medieval Queens. London, UK: Penguin Random House UK. ISBN 9781910702079. OCLC 1003999244.

Matilda of Scotland House of Dunkeld Born: c. 1080 Died: 1 May 1118
English royalty
Vacant Title last held by Matilda of Flanders	Queen consort of the English; 11 November 1100 – 1 May 1118	Vacant Title next held by Adeliza of Louvain
Vacant Title last held by Sibylla of Conversano	Duchess consort of Normandy; 28 September 1106 – 1 May 1118	Vacant Title next held by Matilda of Anjou
