= Battle of Alnwick (1093) =

One of two battles in Northumberland, England

Coordinates: 55.4262°N 1.7005°W

Date	13 November 1093
Location	near present day Alnwick, in Northumberland
Result	English victory

Belligerents
Kingdom of England	Kingdom of Scotland

Commanders and leaders
Robert de Mowbray	King Malcolm III †

The Battle of Alnwick is one of two battles fought near the town of Alnwick in Northumberland, England. In the battle, which occurred on 13 November 1093, Malcolm III of Scotland, later known as Malcolm Canmore, was killed together with his son Edward by an army of English knights led by Robert de Mowbray.

== Background ==
At the time that William II of England, known as William Rufus, came to power, the control of northern Northumbria was still an open question. William set about rectifying this by appointing strong barons who would control the border and prevent Scottish incursions. It appears that Malcolm Canmore had ambitions regarding both Cumbria and Northumbria, and in May 1091 he invaded Northumbria and besieged Durham. William Rufus was forced to lead a large army north to meet this threat. He advanced into Scotland with Malcolm retreating in front of his army. Eventually a truce was negotiated and William withdrew.

The following year William strengthened his position in Cumbria to prevent the possibility of a Scottish invasion there.

The events leading up to the next invasion are unclear, but in November 1093, Malcolm led an army into Northumbria and began to besiege Alnwick.

== Battle ==
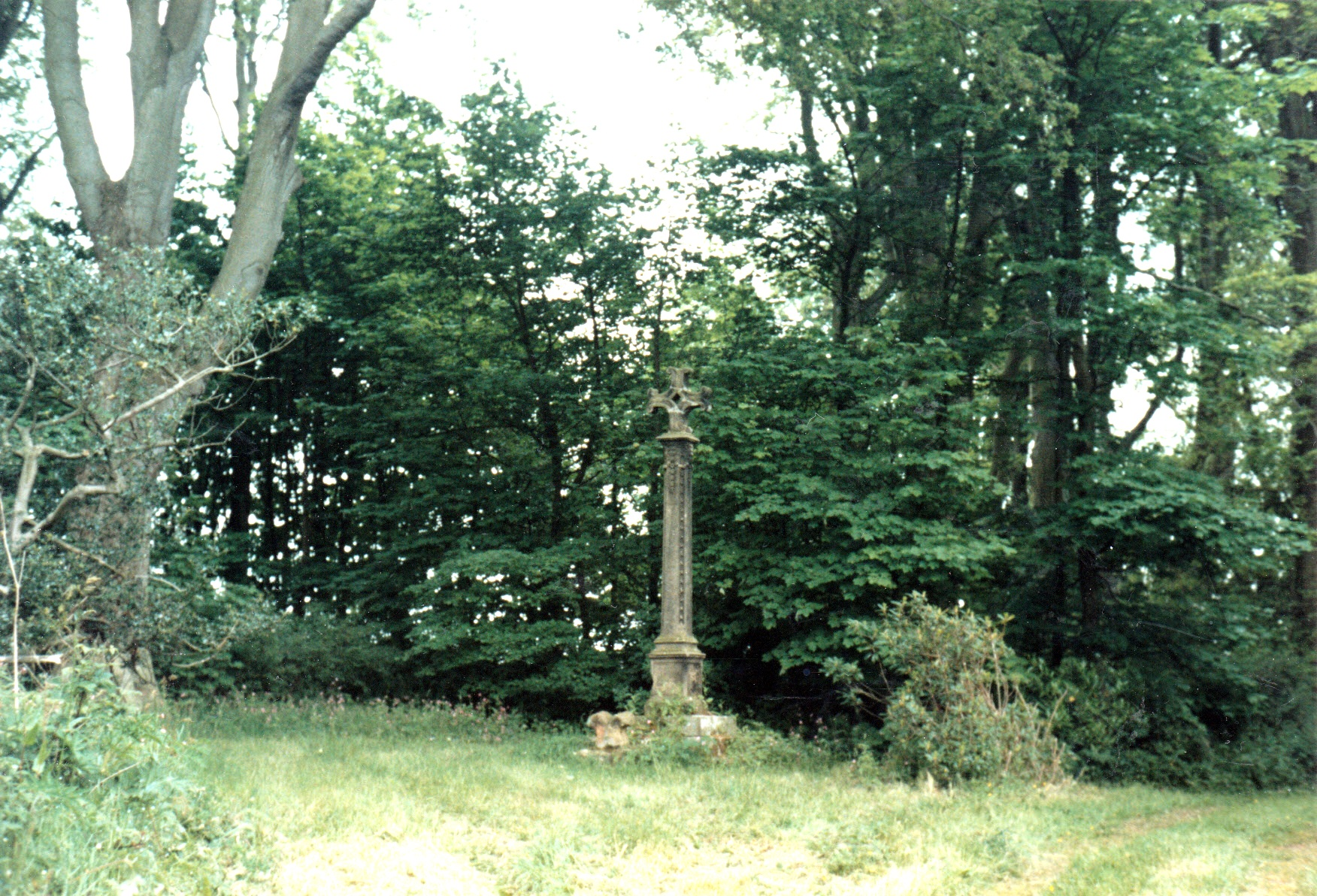
'Malcolm's Cross' is said to mark the spot where Malcolm III of Scotland was killed while attacking Alnwick Castle in 1093.

At that time Robert de Mowbray was Earl of Northumbria, having been pardoned following his part in the Rebellion of 1088 against William II. He was also governor of Bamburgh Castle, a stronghold on the Northumbrian coast. Mowbray did not have a sufficient force at his command to oppose the Scottish army in open battle. However he set out to try to relieve Alnwick. He arrived there with his forces on 13 November (known as St Brice’s Day) and catching the Scottish army by surprise, the English knights attacked them before the ramparts of Alnwick.

Both Malcolm Canmore and his son Edward were killed in the fighting. The spring near which they died subsequently became known as “Malcolm’s Spring” or “Malcolm’s Well”. With Malcolm’s death the Scottish army found itself leaderless, and so headed back to Scotland. The body of Malcolm and his son were interred at Tynemouth Priory. There is uncertainty as to whether Malcolm’s body was re-interred in Dunfermline Abbey.

== Aftermath ==
Malcolm’s death was soon followed by that of his queen, Margaret. The death of Malcolm and his heir meant that there was a dispute over the succession between Malcolm’s surviving sons and his younger brother Donald Bane. Donald became king but a civil war began with Malcolm’s sons trying to displace him. The lack of a strong, undisputed king in Scotland suited William Rufus well.

Robert de Mowbray, who defeated Malcolm, subsequently joined a baronial conspiracy against William Rufus in 1095, and, as a result, was dispossessed and imprisoned for life.

A rough stone memorial was placed to mark the place of the battle, north of Alnwick. This was replaced in 1774 by a more sophisticated one, Malcolm's Cross, erected by the Duchess of Northumberland.

== Bibliography ==
- John Sadler, Battle for Northumbria, 1988, Bridge Studios, ISBN 0-9512630-3-X
- Norman McCord and Richard Thompson, The Northern Counties from AD 1000, 1998, Addison Wesley Longman Limited, ISBN 0-582-49334-X
