= Edmund of Scotland =

Scottish prince

- Born: c. 1070
- Died: after 1097
- House: Dunkeld
- Father: Malcolm III of Scotland
- Mother: Margaret of Wessex

Edmund or Etmond mac Maíl Coluim (c. 1070 – after 1097) was a son of Malcolm III of Scotland and his second wife, Margaret of Wessex. He may be found on some lists of Scottish kings, but there is no evidence that he was king. Although Edmund was probably Malcolm and Margaret's second son, he was passed over in subsequent successions as a result of betraying his siblings by siding with their uncle, Donald III.

On the death of Edmund's father and his heir-designate Edward, Malcolm's eldest son by Margaret, in November 1093, Edmund's uncle Donald took the throne. Edmund and his younger brothers Edgar, Alexander and David fled abroad, to England, to join their half-brother Duncan at the court of William Rufus.

In 1094 Duncan, with Rufus's blessing and the support of landless nobles from the English court and landowners in Lothian, drove Donald from the throne. It is supposed that Edmund, as the next in age, was Duncan's heir-designate. Duncan was forced by a rebellion to send his English allies home, and was shortly afterwards killed. The killer was Máel Petair, Mormaer of Mearns, but the Annals of Ulster and William of Malmesbury agree that the killing was done on the orders of Donald and Edmund.

What caused Edmund to join with his uncle is unknown. It is assumed that Donald appointed him his heir as Donald had no sons of his own, and it is thought that Edmund was granted an appanage to rule.

Edmund's maternal uncle Edgar Ætheling came north in 1097, driving Donald from the throne and installing Edmund's younger brother Edgar as king, with Alexander as his heir-designate. While Donald was mutilated and imprisoned, dying in 1099, Edmund was more fortunate. He was tonsured and sent to the Cluniac monastery at Montacute in Somerset. The exact date of his death is unknown.
