= Duncan of Scotland =

Duncan of Scotland may refer to:

- Duncan I of Scotland (died 1040), king of Scotland
- Duncan II of Scotland (died 1094), king of Scotland
