= David I as Prince of the Cumbrians =

Map of David's principality of "the Cumbrians".

Before David I became the King of Scotland in 1124, he was the prince of the Cumbrians and earl of a great territory in the middle of England acquired by marriage. This period marks the beginning of his life as a great territorial lord. Circa 1113, the year in which King Henry I of England arranged his marriage to an English heiress and the year in which for the first time David can be found in possession of "Scottish" territory, marks the beginning of his rise to Scottish leadership.

== Background ==
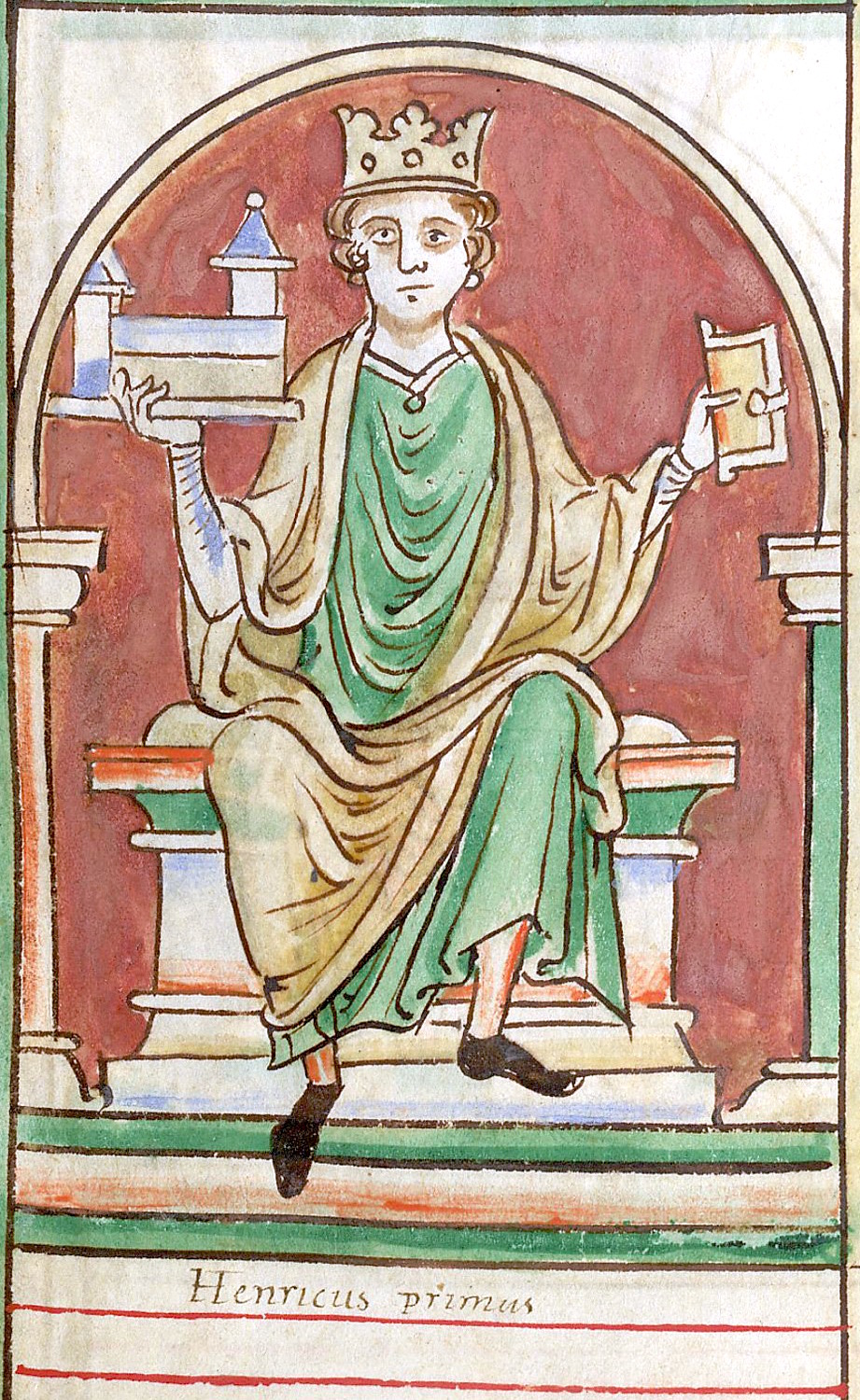
King Henry I of England. Henry's policy in northern Britain and the Irish Sea region essentially made David's political life.

Most historians agree that David I's early career was largely manufactured for him by King Henry I of England. David was one of Henry's "new men", and his "greatest protégé"; Henry's influence had brought David his English marriage and lands, and Henry's military power had allowed David to take up his Scottish lands. David's early career can be understood as part of Henry's frontier policy, which included marriage of two daughters to the kings of Scotland and Galloway, consolidation of royal control in the north-west coast of England and the quelling of the Montgomeries, marcher lords on the Welsh borders who had been allied to Muirchertach Ua Briain, High King of Ireland (1101–19). The world of peace which David had enjoyed in England ended after the death of Henry I, just as it did for most other English magnates.

When Henry I first became king of England, he did so in circumstances that were very irregular. William II, it was said, had been killed in a hunting accident in the New Forest. Henry tentatively assumed power while his elder brother Robert, duke of Normandy and the rightful heir, was on crusade. Thus, as a usurper within his own dynasty, he cast about for a claim to legitimacy. He found it in a marriage to David's sister Edith, often called Matilda in Norman fashion, who had accompanied David in his exile. She was a descendant of the near-extinct dynasty of Wessex through her mother, and thereby provided a crude but effective means to create a legal basis for his rule. As an added benefit, from Henry's viewpoint, she might also provide some protection against further Scottish incursions like those that had plagued the northern English provinces with regularity under Malcolm III. This is not to argue that Henry I and David could not have appreciated each other's company and built their friendship on that basis, of course, but the fact that David was now styled as "the brother of the queen" when he witnessed documents does suggest at least one clear ulterior motive for their friendship and, on Henry's part, points to a familiar and quintessentially feudal logic that underpinned his nurturing of David.

Indeed, it was at Henry's bidding that David gained experience as a judge in the royal courts; it was Henry who organized his aforementioned marriage to Maud de Senlis (Matilda) in 1113, thereby installing David as one of the seven earls of the English realm; and it was Henry who ensured that the will of king Edgar was fulfilled, giving military aid to David when he was installed in his appanage.

Furthermore, this organization of power based upon personal relationships peculiar to the feudal system ensured that, after he became king of Scotland in 1124, the only thing that kept David from pursuing a policy of vigorous expansion was his friendship with Henry. To be sure, it should not be surprising to learn that David harboured territorial ambitions – such desires were cultivated by the prevailing culture of the Normans, the greatest warriors of the age, and applauded if they ended in conquest – nor should it be any surprise that he soon sought to express them upon Henry's death. That he should seek to place those ambitions upon a solid basis of propriety would have been even less remarkable, had a suitable excuse to attack not been conveniently at hand.

When Henry I died in 1135, David had already sat upon the throne of Scotland for nearly eleven years. He had also, in his capacity as a great English nobleman, been the first to swear obedience to Henry's daughter, his own niece, the former Empress of Germany, Matilda, supporting her succession in lieu of any legitimate male heirs – Henry's son having predeceased him, drowning in the famous disaster of the White Ship in 1120.

== The unclaimed inheritance ==
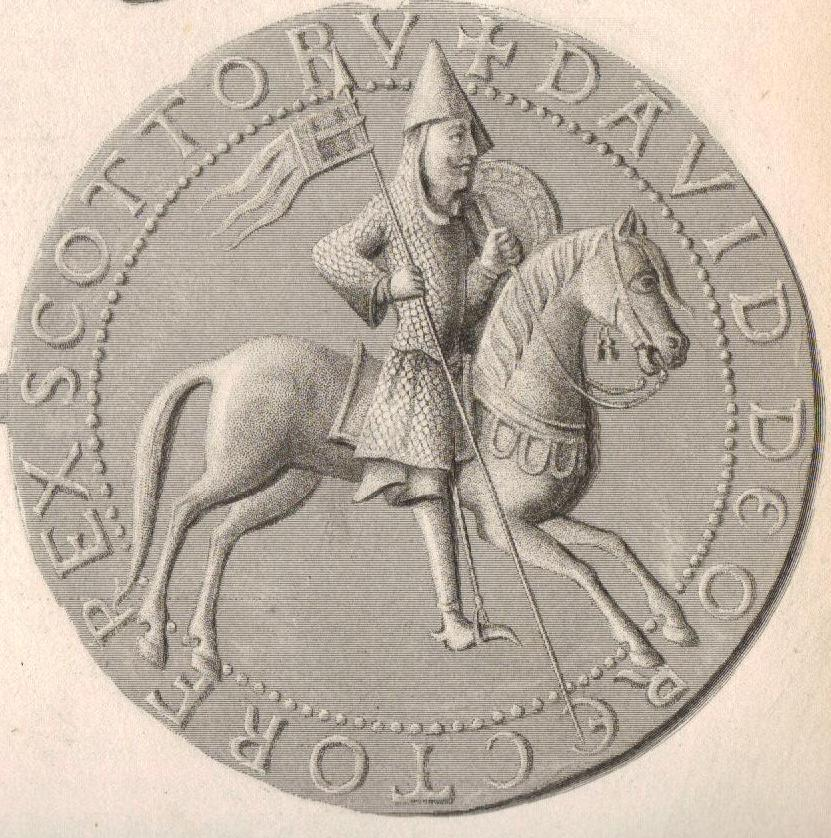
Steel engraving and enhancement of the reverse side of the Great Seal of David I, a picture in the Anglo-Continental style depicting David as a warrior leader. It is very similar to the seal of his brother, Alexander I of Scotland.

On 8 January 1107 David's brother Edgar died. It is often assumed that David took control of his inheritance, the southern lands bequeathed by Edgar, straight after the latter's death. However, much of the evidence indicates that David had to wait until 1113 to get the support he needed to take control of these lands because of King Alexander's opposition; it cannot be demonstrated that he possessed his inheritance until his foundation of Selkirk Abbey late in the year 1113. David's exact whereabouts between May 1108 and December 1113 are not explicitly attested in any sources, but according to the arguments of Richard Oram, all of this time was spent both in England and in Normandy. By the end of his time in the Kingdom of the English David had acquired lands in Yorkshire and in Normandy, receiving Hallamshire and the northern section of the Cotentin Peninsula from King Henry. David was probably in Henry's company when the latter campaigned in Normandy during this period, and David was probably given these lands as a reward for his services as a trusted subordinate. It was from Normandy and his possessions in the Cotentin Peninsula that David drew most of his early core followers, men such as Robert de Brus, Hugh de Morville and Ranulf de Soules, who became his chief magnates in the conquered territory between Cumberland and the Kingdom of Scotland; from here he probably brought his confessor John, the man who became the first bishop of David's reorganised diocese of Glasgow. According to Oram, it was only in 1113, when Henry had returned to England, that David was at last in a position to claim his inheritance in southern "Scotland".

=== Seizure of inheritance ===
There is no evidence which shows that King Henry himself participated in the campaign in person, but it is clear that his backing was enough to force King Alexander to recognize his younger brother's claims. This probably occurred without bloodshed. Years later, when David invaded England with a huge army composed almost entirely of Gaelic Scots, Ailred of Rievaulx has a Norman knight named Robert de Brus lament and complain to David about his betrayal of the Angli and Normanni, the English and Normans, whom he once relied upon. Among other things, the knight asserted:

"Oh King, when thou didst demand from thy brother Alexander the part of the kingdom which the same brother [Edgar] had bequeathed at his death didst obtain without bloodshed all that thou wouldst, through fear of us"

It was in this way, through a bloodless threat of force, that David gained his first territorial foothold within the area of modern Scotland. David's aggression seems to have inspired resentment amongst some native Scots. A recently rediscovered Gaelic quatrain from this period complains that:

Olc a ndearna mac Mael Colaim,	It's bad what Máel Coluim's son has done;,
ar cosaid re hAlaxandir,	dividing us from Alexander;
do-ní le gach mac rígh romhaind,	he causes, like each king's son before;
foghail ar faras Albain.	the plunder of stable Alba.

If "divided from" is anything to go by, this quatrain may have been written in David's new territories in southern "Scotland". The lands in question consisted of the pre-1994 counties of Roxburghshire, Selkirkshire, Berwickshire, Peeblesshire and Lanarkshire. David, moreover, gained the title princeps Cumbrensis, "Prince of the Cumbrians", as attested in David's charters from this era. Although this was a large slice of Scotland south of the river Forth, the region of Galloway-proper was entirely outside David's control. David may perhaps have had some varying degrees of overlordship in parts of Dumfriesshire, Ayrshire, Dunbartonshire and Renfrewshire; these lands were thought of as part of a [Greater] "Galloway", settled by Gall Gaidel, Gaelic-speakers of mixed Gaelic and Norse descent, and in the early days of David's lordship would have rendered no more than occasional payments of cain, the tribute paid to an overlord in Scotland. Upon the lands between Galloway and the Principality of Cumbria, David eventually setup large-scale marcher lordships, such as Annandale for Robert de Brus, Cunningham for Hugh de Morville, and possibly Strathgryfe for Walter fitz Alan.

== Reformer ==
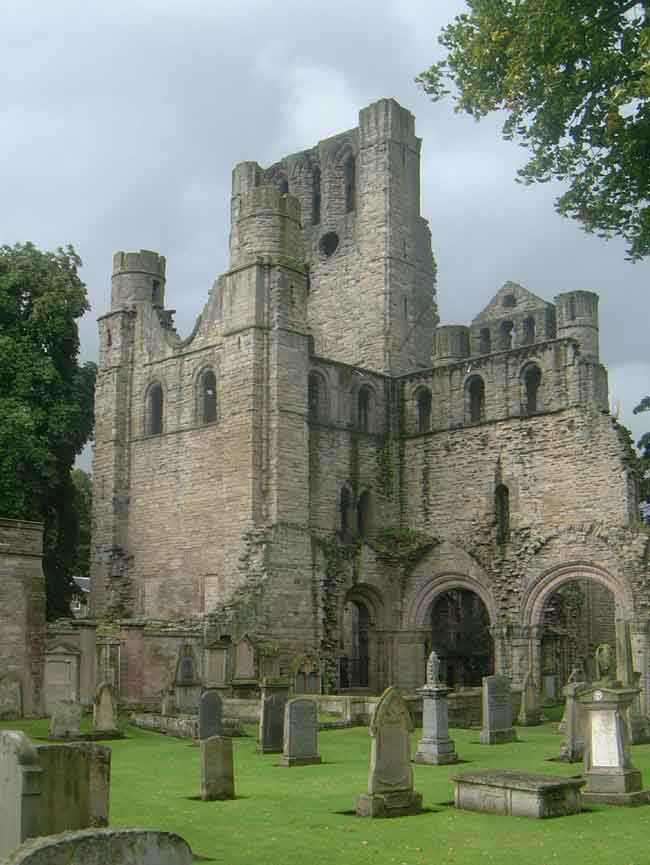
The modern ruins of Kelso Abbey. This establishment was originally at Selkirk from 1113, but was moved to Kelso in 1128 to better serve David's southern "capital" at Roxburgh.

In part, David made use of the "English" income secured for him by his marriage to Matilda de Senlis in order to finance the construction of the first true towns in Scotland, and these in turn allowed the establishment of several more. As Prince of the Cumbrians, David founded the first two burghs of "Scotland", at Roxburgh and Berwick. These were settlements with defined boundaries and guaranteed trading rights, locations where the king could collect and sell the products of his cain and conveth (a payment made in lieu of providing the king hospitality) rendered to him. These burghs were essentially Scotland's first towns. David would found more of these burghs when he became King of Scots. In 1113, in perhaps David's first act as Prince of the Cumbrians, he founded Selkirk Abbey for the Tironensian Order. Several years later, perhaps in 1116, David visited Tiron itself, probably to acquire more monks; in 1128 he transferred Selkirk Abbey to Kelso, nearer Roxburgh, at this point his chief residence.

== Renewed bishopric of Glasgow ==
Almost as soon as he was in charge of the Cumbrian principality, David placed the bishopric of Glasgow under his chaplain, John, whom David may have met for the first time during his participation in Henry's conquest of Normandy after 1106. John himself was closely associated with the Tironensian Order, and presumably committed to the new Gregorian ideas regarding episcopal organization. David carried out an inquest, afterwards assigned to the bishopric all the lands of his principality, except those in the east of his principality which were already governed by the Scotland-proper based bishop of St Andrews. David was responsible for assigning to Glasgow enough lands directly to make the bishopric self-sufficient and for ensuring that in the longer term Glasgow would become the second most important bishopric in the Kingdom of Scotland. By the 1120s, work also began on building a proper cathedral for the diocese. David would also try to ensure that his reinvigorated episcopal see would retain independence from other bishoprics, an aspiration which would generate a great deal of tension with the English church, where both the Archbishop of Canterbury and the Archbishop of York claimed overlordship.

== Activities in England ==
The year 1113 was an important in another respect. In the later part of the year, King Henry gave David the hand of Matilda de Senlis, daughter of Waltheof, earl of Northumberland. The marriage brought with it the "Honour of Huntingdon and Northampton", a lordship which was scattered in the shires of Northampton, Huntingdon and Bedford. Moreover, within a few years Matilda de Senlis bore to him a son, whom David named Henry after his patron, King Henry I. Judith Green believes that Henry I's generosity had two causes; firstly, his wife — David's sister Matilda — was pressuring her husband to bestow favour on her younger brother; secondly, Henry wished to secure support for his succession plans. David would naturally be expected to support Henry's heirs as they would be David's own kin, and so boosting David's power was very much in Henry's interest. The new territories David gained control of were very much a boost, a valuable supplement to his income and manpower, increasing his status as one of the most powerful magnates in the Kingdom of the English. Moreover, Matilda's father Waltheof had been Earl of Northumberland, a defunct lordship which had covered the far north of England and included Cumberland and Westmorland, Northumberland-proper, as well as overlordship of the bishopric of Durham. David would later revive the claim to this earldom for his son Henry, but that was in the future, only after the death of King Henry.

Like his activities before 1113, David's activities and personal whereabouts after 1114 are not always easy to trace. He spent much of his time outside his principality. He was, for instance, at St Albans on 28 December 1115, and was still in England in 1116 when he witnessed a charter of his sister Queen Matilda (Edith, or Maud) at Westminster Abbey. Despite the death of his sister on 1 May 1118, David remained a favoured vassal of King Henry. He was at Henry's court in the years 1121 and 1122. He was in the south of England in the summer of 1123, and it is possible that David accompanied Henry to Normandy in the same year to suppress William Clito's claim for the Duchy of Normandy. If David did go to France, then by the time he returned to Britain in 1124 his brother Alexander had died.
