= King Duncan (disambiguation) =

King Duncan is a character in William Shakespeare's play Macbeth.

King Duncan may also refer to:

- Duncan I of Scotland (died 1040), king of Alba, on whom the character is based Macbeth
- Duncan II of Scotland (1060–1094), king of Scots
