= Alexander I of Scotland =

King of Alba from 1107 to 1124

Alexander I
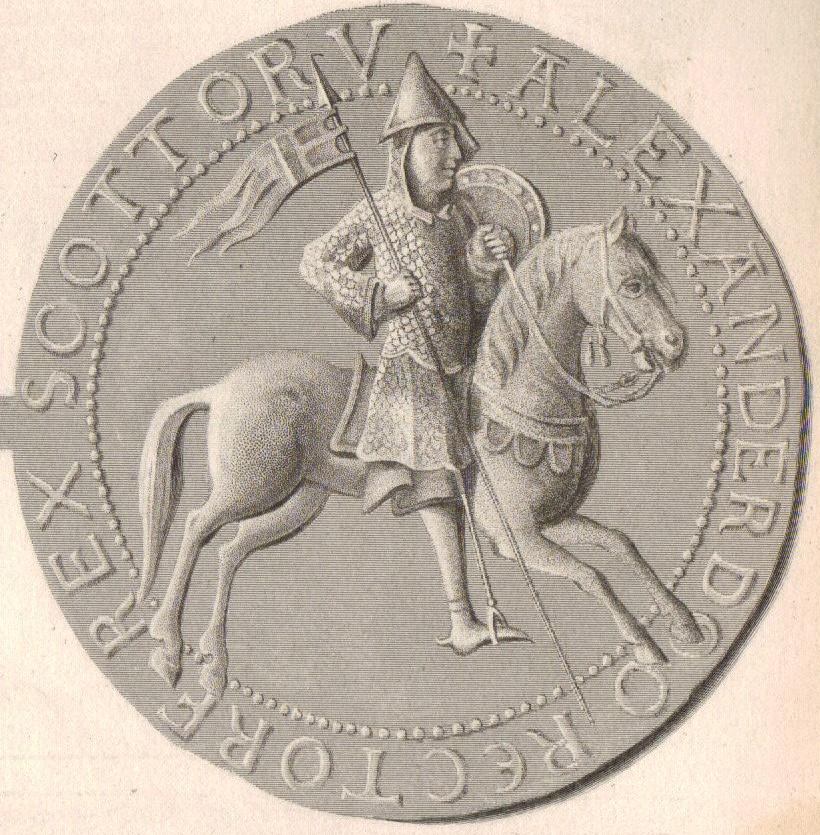
- The reverse of Alexander's seal, enhanced as a 19th century steel engraving

King of Alba (Scotland)
- Reign: 8 January 1107 – 23 April 1124
- Predecessor: Edgar
- Successor: David I
- Born: c. 1078; Dunfermline
- Died: 23 April 1124 (aged 45); Stirling
- Burial: Dunfermline Abbey
- Spouse: Sybilla of Normandy
- Issue: Malcolm (illegitimate)
- House: Dunkeld
- Father: Malcolm III of Scotland
- Mother: Margaret of Wessex

Alexander I (medieval Gaelic: Alaxandair mac Maíl Coluim; modern Gaelic: Alasdair mac Mhaol Chaluim; c. 1078 – 23 April 1124), posthumously nicknamed The Fierce, was the King of Alba (Scotland) from 1107 to his death. He was the fifth son of Malcolm III and his second wife, Margaret, sister of Edgar Ætheling, a prince of the pre-conquest English royal house.

He succeeded his brother, King Edgar, and his successor was his brother David. He was married to Sybilla of Normandy, an illegitimate daughter of Henry I of England.

== Life ==
Alexander was the fifth (some sources say fourth) son of Malcolm III and his wife Margaret of Wessex, grandniece of Edward the Confessor. Alexander was named after Pope Alexander II.

He was the younger brother of King Edgar, who was unmarried, and his brother's heir presumptive by 1104 (and perhaps earlier). In that year, he was the senior layman present at the examination of the remains of Saint Cuthbert at Durham prior to their re-interment. He held lands in Scotland north of the Forth and in Lothian.

On the death of Edgar in 1107, Alexander succeeded to the Scottish crown but, in accordance with Edgar's instructions, their brother David was granted an appanage in southern Scotland. Edgar's will granted David the lands of the former kingdom of Strathclyde or Cumbria and this was apparently agreed in advance by Edgar, Alexander, David and their brother-in-law Henry I of England. In 1113, perhaps at Henry's instigation, and with the support of his Anglo-Norman allies, David demanded and received, additional lands in Lothian along the Upper Tweed and Teviot. David did not receive the title of king, but of "prince of the Cumbrians", and his lands remained under Alexander's final authority.

The dispute over Tweeddale and Teviotdale does not appear to have damaged relations between Alexander and David, although it was unpopular in some quarters. A Gaelic poem laments:

It's bad what Malcolm's son has done,
dividing us from Alexander;
he causes, like each king's son before,
the plunder of stable Alba.

The dispute over the eastern marches does not appear to have caused lasting trouble between Alexander and Henry of England. In 1114, he joined Henry on campaign in Wales against Gruffudd ap Cynan of Gwynedd. Alexander's marriage with Henry's illegitimate daughter Sybilla of Normandy may have occurred as early as 1107, or as late as 1114.

William of Malmesbury's account attacks Sybilla, but the evidence argues that Alexander and Sybilla were a devoted but childless couple and Sybilla was of noteworthy piety. Sybilla died in unrecorded circumstances at Eilean nam Ban (Kenmore on Loch Tay) in July 1122 and was buried at Dunfermline Abbey. Alexander did not remarry and Walter Bower wrote that he planned an Augustinian Priory at the Eilean nam Ban dedicated to Sybilla's memory, and he may have taken steps to have her venerated.

Alexander had at least one illegitimate child, Máel Coluim mac Alaxandair, who was later involved in a revolt against David I in the 1130s. He was imprisoned at Roxburgh for many years afterwards, perhaps until his death sometime after 1157.

Alexander was, like his brothers Edgar and David, a notably pious king. He was responsible for foundations at Scone and Inchcolm, the latter founded in thanks for his survival of a tempest at sea nearby. He had the two towers built which flanked the great western entrance of Dunfermline Abbey, where his mother was buried.

His mother's chaplain and hagiographer Thurgot was named Bishop of Saint Andrews (or Cell Rígmonaid) in 1107, presumably by Alexander's order. The case of Thurgot's would-be successor Eadmer shows that Alexander's wishes were not always accepted by the religious community, perhaps because Eadmer had the backing of the Archbishop of Canterbury, Ralph d'Escures, rather than Thurstan of York. Alexander also patronised Saint Andrews, granting lands intended for an Augustinian Priory, which may have been the same as that intended to honour his wife.

For all his religiosity, Alexander was not remembered as a man of peace. John of Fordun says of him:

Now the king was a lettered and godly man; very humble and amiable towards the clerics and regulars, but terrible beyond measure to the rest of his subjects; a man of large heart, exerting himself in all things beyond his strength.

He manifested the terrible aspect of his character in his reprisals in the Province of Moray. Andrew of Wyntoun's Orygynale Cronykil of Scotland says that Alexander was holding court at Invergowrie when he was attacked by "men of the Isles". Walter Bower says the attackers were from Moray and Mearns. Alexander pursued them north, to "Stockford" in Ross (near Beauly) where he defeated them. This, says Wyntoun, is why he was named the "Fierce". The dating of this is uncertain, as are his enemies' identities. However, in 1116 the Annals of Ulster report: "Ladhmann son of Domnall, grandson of the king of Scotland, was killed by the men of Moray." The king referred to is Alexander's father, Malcolm III, and Domnall was Alexander's half brother. The Province or Kingdom of Moray was ruled by the family of Macbeth (Mac Bethad mac Findláich) and Lulach (Lulach mac Gille Coemgáin): not overmighty subjects, but a family who had ruled Alba within little more than a lifetime. Who the Mormaer or King was at this time is not known; it may have been Óengus of Moray or his father, whose name is not known. As for the Mearns, the only known Mormaer of Mearns, Máel Petair, had murdered Alexander's half-brother Duncan II (Donnchad mac Maíl Coluim) in 1094.

Alexander died in April 1124 at his court at Stirling; his brother David, probably the acknowledged heir since the death of Sybilla, succeeded him.

=== Religious policy and church reform ===
Alexander has been regarded by modern historians as an important patron of ecclesiastical reform in Scotland. During his reign he maintained close links with the churches of Durham and Canterbury, appointed Thurgot of Durham and later Eadmer of Canterbury to the see of St Andrews, and promoted the introduction of the Augustinian order into Scotland. The Augustinian priory at Scone, traditionally dated to 1114–1115, was founded during his reign and became an important royal religious foundation. Alexander also initiated measures later completed under David I, including plans for Augustinian foundations at St Andrews and Inchcolm. Historian Kenneth Veitch argues that Alexander's policies helped lay foundations for the wider twelfth-century transformation of the Scottish Church.

== Fictional portrayals ==
Alexander was depicted in a fantasy novel, Pater Nostras Canis Dirus: The Garrison Effect (2010). Alexander is depicted as troubled by his lack of direct heirs, having no child with his wife Sybilla of Normandy. He points out that his father-in-law Henry I of England is asking them for a grandson.

== Sources ==
- Barrow, Geoffrey (2003). The Kingdom of the Scots: Government, Church and Society from the Eleventh to the Fourteenth Century. Edinburgh University Press. ISBN 978-0-7486-1803-3.
- Archibald Alexander McBeth Duncan (2002). The kingship of the Scots, 842-1292: succession and independence. Edinburgh University Press. ISBN 978-0-7486-1626-8.
- Oram, Richard D. (2004). David I: the king who made Scotland. Tempus Publishing Ltd. ISBN 978-0-7524-2825-3.
- Russell Andrew McDonald (2003). Outlaws of medieval Scotland: challenges to the Canmore kings, 1058-1266. Tuckwell Press, Ltd. ISBN 978-1-86232-236-3.
- Saint Andrews, Sawyer; Brodrick, John F. (2010). Pater Nostras Canis Dirus: The Garrison Effect. AuthorHouse. ISBN 978-1-4520-9356-7.
- Veitch, Kenneth (Autumn 2001). "'Replanting Paradise': Alexander I and the reform of religious life in Scotland". The Innes Review. 52 (2): 136–166. doi:10.3366/inr.2001.52.2.136.

Alexander I of Scotland House of Dunkeld Born: c. 1078 Died: 23 April 1124
Regnal titles
Preceded by Edgar	King of Alba; 1107–1124	Succeeded by David I
