= Ingibiorg Finnsdottir =

Queen of Scotland

- Born: c. early 1000s Norway
- Died: c. 1069; Scotland
- Spouse: Thorfinn Sigurdsson; Malcolm III, King of Alba
- Issue: Paul Thorfinnsson; Erlend Thorfinnsson; Duncan II, King of Alba
- Father: Finn Arnesson
- Mother: Bergljot Halvdansdottir

Ingibiorg Finnsdottir (normalised Old Norse: Ingibjǫrg Finnsdóttir, Norwegian: Ingebjørg Finnsdotter) was a daughter of Earl Finn Arnesson and Bergljot Halvdansdottir. She was also a niece of Kings Olaf II and Harald Hardrada of Norway. She was also known as Ingibjǫrg Jarlamóðir (Ingibiorg, the Earls'-Mother). The dates of her life are unknown.

She married Earl Thorfinn Sigurdsson of Orkney. The Orkneyinga Saga claims that Kalf Arnesson, Ingibiorg's uncle, was exiled in Orkney after her marriage to Thorfinn. This was during the reign of Magnus the Good, son of Olaf II, who ruled from 1035 to 1047, and probably before the death of Harthacanute in 1042. Thorfinn and Ingibiorg had two known sons, Paul and Erlend Thorfinnsson, who jointly ruled as earls of Orkney. Both also fought in Harald Hardraade's ill-fated invasion of the Kingdom of England in 1066.

Ingibiorg remarried after Thorfinn's death (date unknown). Her second husband was King Malcolm III of Scotland. Whatever the date of the marriage, Malcolm and Ingibiorg had at least one son, and probably two. The Orkneyinga Saga tells us that Duncan II (Donnchad mac Mail Coluim) was their son, and it is presumed that the "Domnall son of Máel Coluim, King of Scotland" whose death in 1085 is reported by the Annals of Ulster was also their son.

Ingibiorg is presumed to have died in around 1069 as Malcolm married Margaret, sister of Edgar Ætheling, in about 1070. It may be, however, that she died before Malcolm became king, as an Ingeborg comitissa appears in the Liber Vitae Ecclesiae Dunelmensis, a list of those monks and notables from whom prayers were said at Durham, alongside persons known to have died around 1058. If Ingibiorg was never queen, it would help to explain the apparent ignorance of her existence displayed by some Scots chroniclers.
