= House of Dunkeld =

Royal house of Scotland

The House of Dunkeld (in Scottish Gaelic: Dùn Chailleann, lit. 'Fort of the Caledonii' or "of the Caledonians") is a historiographical and genealogical construct to illustrate the clear succession of Scottish kings from 1034 to 1040 and from 1058 to 1286. The line is also variously referred to by historians as "The Canmores" and "MacMalcolm".

Dynastically more or less in the wake of Cenél nGabráin of Dál Riata, "race of Fergus", as "house" was an originally Celtic concept to express one of the two rival leading clans of early medieval Scotland, whose founding father is king Fergus Mor of Dalriada. This Ferguside royal clan had disputed the crown (of Dalriada, then that of Alba) against the Cenél Loairn, the later House of Moray for the preceding four or more centuries. The Cenél nGabráin were represented by the House of Alpin before Dunkeld.

Sir Iain Moncreiffe made the case that Crínán of Dunkeld was actually a kinsman of Saint Columba and thus a member of the Irish Cenél Conaill, a royal branch of the Northern Uí Néill dynasty. Christopher Cairney makes the case for a different Uí Néill descent in the Cenél nEógain. This does not exclude Crínán's descendants from also being a (female line) continuation of the Cenél nGabráin through Bethóc.

The Dunkeld dynasty is genealogically based on Duncan I of Scotland being of a different agnatic clan to his predecessor and maternal grandfather Malcolm II of Scotland. However, sociohistorically, the reign of Duncan's son Malcolm III of Scotland, which happens to coincide with the start of the centuries-long period of strong influence from southern neighbour, the Kingdom of England, has been seen as a more important place to start.

== Time and features ==
During the time of the House of Dunkeld, succession to the Scottish throne evolved towards primogeniture instead of the Irish-Celtic tradition of tanistry and the Pictish traditions (whether they were matrilineal or not). Although the contemporaries did not have a common name for these monarchs, they were a family who formed a hereditary kingship.

Distinctive characteristics of the developments of society during this dynasty:

- Scotland was more influenced by outsiders than it had been earlier, or was to be under the kings of the House of Bruce and House of Stuart. The kingdom was contested by two established powers: the Kingdom of England and Norway. The common goal uniting the usual policies of kings of this dynasty was to attempt to balance the two neighbours, while also sometimes making further alliances so as to have some outside support (e.g. France in the Middle Ages). Wars were fought on both fronts.
- Many Norman lords and institutions were brought to Scotland, especially after the Norman Conquest of England; by the end of the period, both had been in Scotland for centuries. The tribal polity evolved to a medieval feudal society, adopting legal traditions from Rome, and the elite evolved to become broadly "Frankish" in custom, a change strengthened by the immigration into Scotland of (Anglo-Saxon) English, Normans and French.

The Dunkeld dynasty rose to rule in a time when the kingdom was fragmented, under increasing outside threats, and some monarchs started to initiate more centralized government. The Dunkelds came to power after the two centuries of civil unrest under the House of Alpin.

The first king of this new Dunkeld dynasty was Malcolm III of Scotland who determined that succession would be to the eldest son, not according to the rules of tanistry. This political decision reduced the conflicts inside the royal family. The Dunkelds consolidated Scotland's union and independence as a kingdom, despite several skirmishes with the neighbouring England.

The fall of the House of Dunkeld began in 1286, when Alexander III died in a horse riding accident. The king had no living sons, only one three-year-old granddaughter, Margaret, princess of Norway. Fearing the influence of her father, King Eric II of Norway, and another endless civil war, the Scottish nobles appealed to Edward I of England. The Queen-designate Margaret was, in turn, betrothed to the future Edward II of England, but she died shortly afterwards, not long after her arrival in Scotland.

The dynasty thus ended, at a time when immigrant-originated feudal families had reached a level of prosperity almost as high as that of the king. The beneficiaries of this feudal system desired a sufficient guarantee of their positions, rights and properties—even at the cost of national independence.

The de Lundin family is descended in the male line from a Dunkeld prince, Robert, the bastard son of William the Lion.

== Kings of the House of Dunkeld ==
1. Duncan I, r. 1034–1040
2. Malcolm III, r. 1058–1093
3. Donald III, r. 1093–1094 and 1094–1097
4. Duncan II, r. 1094
5. Edgar, r. 1097–1107
6. Alexander I, r. 1107–1124
7. David I, r. 1124–1153
8. Malcolm IV, r. 1153–1165
9. William I, known as William the Lion, r. 1165–1214
10. Alexander II, r. 1214–1249
11. Alexander III, r. 1249–1286
12. Margaret, r. 1286

On Alexander III's death his granddaughter Margaret (Maid of Norway) was recognised as "right heir", as had been agreed in Alexander's lifetime, but she was never inaugurated as Queen of Scots.

== See also ==
- Dunkeld, settlement in Scotland
- History of Scotland
- Scottish monarchs family tree
