= Mormaer of Mearns =

Medieval Scottish Mormaerdom

The Mormaer or Mormaerdom of Mearns is the most obscure medieval Scottish mormaerdom. It is known only from one source, a source relating that Máel Petair, Mormaer of Mearns, killed Donnchad II. There is good reason to believe that this is not some mistake, and that Mearns was once a Mormaerdom. The early thirteenth century source, known to historians a de Situ Albanie, adds believability to this because it lists Mearns in a list of 13 Scottish regions which in 6½ pairs each formed one of the seven ancient Kingdoms of the Picts. Only two of the eleven other regions are not attested in sources as Mormaerdoms, those ones being Fothriff and Gowrie. It is probable that by the time Mormaers begin to be consistently attested, i.e. roughly between 1150 and 1250, Mearns was absorbed by the crown and not regranted.

Confusingly, Mormaer means Great Steward; Maerns means merely Stewardry, and would be expected to be Mormaerns if there was a Mormaerdom.

== Bibliography ==
- Anderson, Alan Orr, Early Sources of Scottish History: AD 500-1286, 2 Vols, (Edinburgh, 1922), Vol. I, pp. 89–91
