= Máel Petair of Mearns =

Medieval Scottish nobleman

Máel Petair of Mearns is the only known Mormaer of the Mearns. His name means "tonsured one of (Saint) Peter". Little is known of him except that, in 1094, he is said to have killed King Duncan II of Scotland, suggesting he was an associate of Donald III of Scotland. His father is believed to have been a man called Loren.

== Bibliography ==
- Anderson, Alan Orr, Early Sources of Scottish History: AD 500-1286, 2 Vols, (Edinburgh, 1922), Vol. II, pp. 89–91

Preceded by ?	Mormaer of Mearns fl. 1094	Succeeded by ?
