= Duncan II of Scotland =

King of Alba in 1094

Duncan II
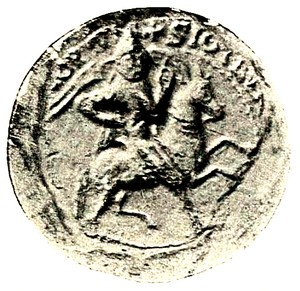
- Duncan II in his seal, the earliest seal of a Scottish monarch

King of Alba
- Reign: May 1094–12 November 1094
- Predecessor: Donald III
- Successor: Donald III
- Born: c. 1060
- Died: 12 November 1094
- Burial: Dunfermline Abbey
- Spouse: Ethelreda of Northumbria
- Issue: William fitz Duncan
- House: Dunkeld
- Father: Malcolm III
- Mother: Ingibiorg Finnsdottir

Donnchad mac Máel Coluim (Modern Gaelic: Donnchadh mac Mhaoil Chaluim; (Note: Donnchad mac Maíl Coluim is the Mediaeval Gaelic form.) anglicised as Duncan II; c. 1060 – 12 November 1094) was King of Alba. He was son of Malcolm III (Máel Coluim mac Donnchada) and his first wife Ingibiorg Finnsdottir, widow of Thorfinn Sigurdsson, earl of Orkney.

== Early life ==
The identity of Duncan's mother is given by the Orkneyinga saga, which records the marriage of Malcolm and Ingibiorg, and then mentions "their son was Duncan, King of Scots, father of William". Duncan II got his name from that of his grandfather, Duncan I of Scotland. However, Ingibiorg is never mentioned by primary sources written by Scottish and English chroniclers. She might have been a concubine or had a marriage not recognized by the Church. William of Malmesbury calls Duncan an illegitimate son of Malcolm III. This account influenced a number of Medieval commentators, who also dismissed Duncan as an illegitimate son. However, this claim is propaganda reflecting the need of Malcolm's descendants by Margaret to undermine the claims of Duncan's descendants, the Meic Uilleim.

Duncan was given into the keeping of William the Conqueror in 1072 as a hostage. The Annals of Ulster note that the "French went into Scotland and brought away the son of the king of Scotland as hostage" (by French, the text is referring to the Normans). The context of this event was the initial conflict between Malcolm III and William. Edgar Ætheling, the last remaining male member of the English royal family, had fled to Scotland in 1068, seeking protection from the invading Normans. Edgar sought Malcolm's assistance in his struggle against William. The relationship was reinforced when Malcolm married Ætheling's sister, Margaret, in 1071. The Norman conquest of England also involved William securing control over the areas of Northumbria. Malcolm probably perceived this move as a threat to his own areas of Cumbria and Lothian. In 1070, possibly claiming he was redressing the wrongs against his brother-in-law, Malcolm responded with a "savage raid" of Northern England.

The formal link between the royal house of Scotland and Wessex and Malcolm's forays in northern England were an obvious threat to William who counter-attacked with a full-scale invasion of southern Scotland in 1072. Malcolm met William in Abernethy. In the resulting Treaty of Abernethy, Malcolm submitted to William for Malcolm's lands in England (Cambria and Northumbria) but not for Scotland. Though the facts are not clear, one of the conditions of the agreement may have been that Edgar Ætheling leave the Scottish court. The offering of Duncan, Malcolm's eldest son, as hostage was probably another term of the treaty.

Duncan was raised in the Anglo-Norman court of William I, becoming familiar with the culture, education, and institutions of his hosts. He was trained as a Norman knight and participated in William's campaigns. In 1087, William died, and his eldest surviving son Robert Curthose succeeded him as Duke of Normandy. According to Florence of Worcester, Robert released Duncan from custody and had him officially knighted. Duncan was allowed to leave the Duchy of Normandy. He chose to join the court of William II of England, younger brother to Robert. His father, who by then had many sons, appears to have made no effort to obtain Duncan's return. Edward, the eldest paternal half-brother of Duncan, had been designated as heir in his absence. Duncan notably chose to stay with his adoptive culture, partly due to the influence of 15 years of Norman life and partly in pursuit of personal wealth and glory, though he may always have had in mind that one day he would become Scotland's king, like his father and grandfather.

In 1092, hostilities between Malcolm III and William II were ongoing. William managed to capture Carlisle, a major settlement of Cumbria. In 1093, William started the construction of Carlisle Castle. Malcolm reacted by leading his last raid into Northumberland. While marching north again, Malcolm was ambushed by Robert de Mowbray, Earl of Northumbria, whose lands he had devastated, near Alnwick on 13 November 1093. There he was killed by Arkil Morel, steward of Bamburgh Castle, at the Battle of Alnwick. (Note: The Annals of Innisfallen say he "was slain with his son in an unguarded moment in battle".) Edward was mortally wounded in the same fight. Malcolm's queen Margaret died days after receiving the news of their deaths from her son Edgar. The resulting power vacuum allowed Donald III of Scotland (Domnall Bán mac Donnchada), younger brother of Malcolm, to seize the throne. The new monarch represented the interests of "a resentful native aristocracy", driving out the Anglo-Saxons and Normans who had come to the court of Malcolm and Margaret. The event allowed Duncan to lay claim to the throne, attempting to depose his uncle. He had the support of William II, in exchange for an oath of fealty to his patron.

== Marriage ==
Duncan married Ethelreda of Northumbria, daughter of Gospatric, Earl of Northumbria. The marriage is recorded in the Cronicon Cumbriæ. They had a single known son, William fitz Duncan.

== Reign and death ==
Donald III had been unable to gain the support of certain landowners and church officials of the Scottish Lowlands, who had ties to the regime of his predecessor. Duncan took advantage, negotiating alliances with these disgruntled supporters of his father's and gaining essential military and financial support for his cause. While William II himself had no intention to join in the campaign, he lent part of the Norman army to the new "warrior-prince". Duncan was able to recruit further levies from local barons and towns of England. He bought support with promises of land and privilege, estates and titles.

By 1094, Duncan was leading a sizeable army, consisting of mercenary knights and infantry. Many of these soldiers probably came from Northumbria, reflecting the familial association of Duncan to Gospatrick. In the early summer, Duncan led his army in an invasion of Scotland. Donald mobilized his own supporters and troops in response. The early phase of the war took place in June, resulting in victory for Duncan. Donald was forced to retreat towards the Scottish Highlands. Duncan was crowned king at Scone, but his support and authority probably did not extend north of the River Forth. His continued power was reliant on the presence of his Anglo-Norman allies.

The continued presence of a foreign occupation army was naturally resented by much of the local population. Duncan himself had spent most of his life abroad, making him an outsider. Months into his reign, landowners and prelates rose against the Normans. The occupation army fared poorly against a series of ongoing raids. Duncan was only able to maintain the throne by negotiating with the rebels. He agreed to their terms, sending most of his foreign supporters back to William.

Sending away his support troops soon backfired. The Lowlands rebels seem to have ceased their activities, but Donald had spent the intervening months rebuilding his army and political support. In November 1094, Donald led his army to the Lowlands and confronted his nephew. On 12 November, Duncan was ambushed and killed in battle, having reigned for less than seven months. Primary sources are unclear about the exact manner of his death. The Annals of Inisfallen report that "Donnchadh [Duncan] son of Mael Coluim [Malcolm], king of Alba, was slain by Domnall [Donald], son of Donnchadh [Duncan]. That same Domnall, moreover, afterwards took the kingship of Alba." The Annals of Ulster report that "Donnchad son of Mael Coluim, king of Scotland, was treacherously killed by his own brothers Domnall and Edmond". As Duncan had no brothers by those names, the text probably points to his uncle Donald and half-brother Edmund, though later texts identify a noble by the name of Máel Petair of Mearns (Malpeder) as the actual murderer.

William of Malmesbury later reported that Duncan was "murdered by the wickedness of his uncle Donald". Florence of Worcester reported that Duncan was killed, but never states who killed him. In Chronicle of the Picts and Scots (1867), there is a 13th century entry recording that Duncan was killed by Máel Petair (Malpeder), through the treachery of Donald. John of Fordun (14th century) finally recorded the better known account of the event, that Duncan was "slain at Monthechin by the Earl of Mernys ... through the wiles of his uncle Donald".

There are two contradictory accounts about the burial place of Duncan II. One reports him buried at Dunfermline Abbey, the other at the isle of Iona.

== Interpretation ==
William Forbes Skene viewed the conflict between Donald III and Duncan II as being essentially a conflict between "the Celtic and the Saxon laws of succession". In other words, it was a conflict between tanistry and hereditary monarchy, Donald being the legitimate heir under the former, Duncan and his brothers under the latter. Donald probably derived his support from the Gaels of Scotland, who formed the majority of the population. His supporters would have had reason to feel threatened by the large number of Anglo-Saxons who had arrived in Scotland under the reign of Malcolm III. The descendants of Malcolm were Anglo-Saxons "in all respects, except that of birth". Their claim to power would be alarming at best to the Gaels.

Skene considered that two foreign rulers played their own part in the conflict. Magnus III of Norway and his fleet were campaigning at the Irish Sea, attempting to establish his authority over the Kingdom of the Isles. The lack of conflict between Donald III and Magnus III might point to an alliance between them – Magnus offering recognition of Donald's rights to the throne, while Donald would withdraw all Scottish claims to the area. Duncan himself was obviously supported by William II of England, who lent him "a numerous army of English and Normans".

The brief reign of Duncan II, culminating with his death at the hands of his own subjects, attests to his unpopularity. He was a usurper in the eyes of the Gaels. His half-brother Edgar, King of Scotland, only managed to gain the throne due to the intervention of William II, his claims again opposed by most of the Gaels. The effects of Edgar's victory were significant, as Anglo-Saxon laws, institutions, and forms of government were adopted in the Kingdom of Scotland. All were "in imitation of the Anglo-Saxon kingdoms", before David I (reigned 1124–1153) introduced Anglo-Norman institutions to the country.

The Edinburgh History of Scottish Literature: From Columba to the Union, until 1707 includes a history of the Kingship by Benjamin Hudson. Hudson feels that Duncan II doomed his own reign by the "fatal move" of sending away his foreign troops, thus divesting himself of his own supporters. He feels that the male-line descendants of Malcolm III and Saint Margaret managed to hold onto the throne until the 13th century precisely because none of them made the same mistake. He points out that Edgar succeeded in holding the throne for a decade because he continued to depend on aid from his political patrons, William II and Henry I of England, who had resources far surpassing those of Donald III and his supporters.

== Legacy ==
Duncan's son by Ethelreda, William fitz Duncan, was a prominent figure during the reigns of Duncan's half-brothers Alexander and David. William seems to have served as an acknowledged heir to them for part of their reigns. His descendants the Meic Uilleim led various revolts against later Scottish kings. The last remaining Meic Uilleim, an infant daughter of Gille Escoib or one of his sons, was put to death in 1229 or 1230:

[T]he same Mac-William's daughter, who had not long left her mother's womb, innocent as she was, was put to death, in the burgh of Forfar, in view of the market place, after a proclamation by the public crier. Her head was struck against the column of the market cross, and her brains dashed out.

The sole surviving charter of Duncan II granted Tynninghame and its surrounding area to the monks of Durham. Among the witnesses of the charter was someone called "Uuiget". The name is probably a rendering of the Old English "Wulfgeat", which was also rendered as "Uviet" in the Domesday Book. The name seems to have been popular in the Midlands and Southern England. There was at least one notable landowner of that name in the 11th century Yorkshire.

G. W. S. Barrow argues that this "Uuiget" is actually Uviet the White, lord of Treverlen (modern Duddingston). Uviet is known for also signing charters of Kings Edgar (reigned 1097–1107), Alexander I (reigned 1107–1124), and David I (reigned 1124–1153). He was closely associated with the royal household for decades, his own descendants forming the landowning dynasties variously known as Uviet(h)s, Eviot(h)s, and Ovioths, with certain lines enduring to the 17th century. Barrows theorises that Uviet the White originally entered Scotland as a companion of Duncan II and that the two shared a similar background, as ambitious knights in the court of William II. His continued support for Duncan's half-brothers points to them inheriting whatever circle of supporters Duncan had formed.

== Reputation ==
The history of George Buchanan considers Duncan to have been summoned to Scotland by its people, as Donald had alienated "all good men who had a veneration for the memory of Malcolm and Margaret" and those nobles refusing to swear allegiance to him. Buchanan assesses Duncan as a distinguished and experienced military man, but "being a military man and not so skilful in the arts of peace", he angered his people with his arrogant and imperious manner.

== Notes ==
Duncan II of Scotland House of Dunkeld Born: c. 1060 Died: 12 November 1094
Regnal titles
Preceded by Donald III	King of Alba; 1094	Succeeded by Donald III
