= British queen mothers =

Queen dowagers of the United Kingdom

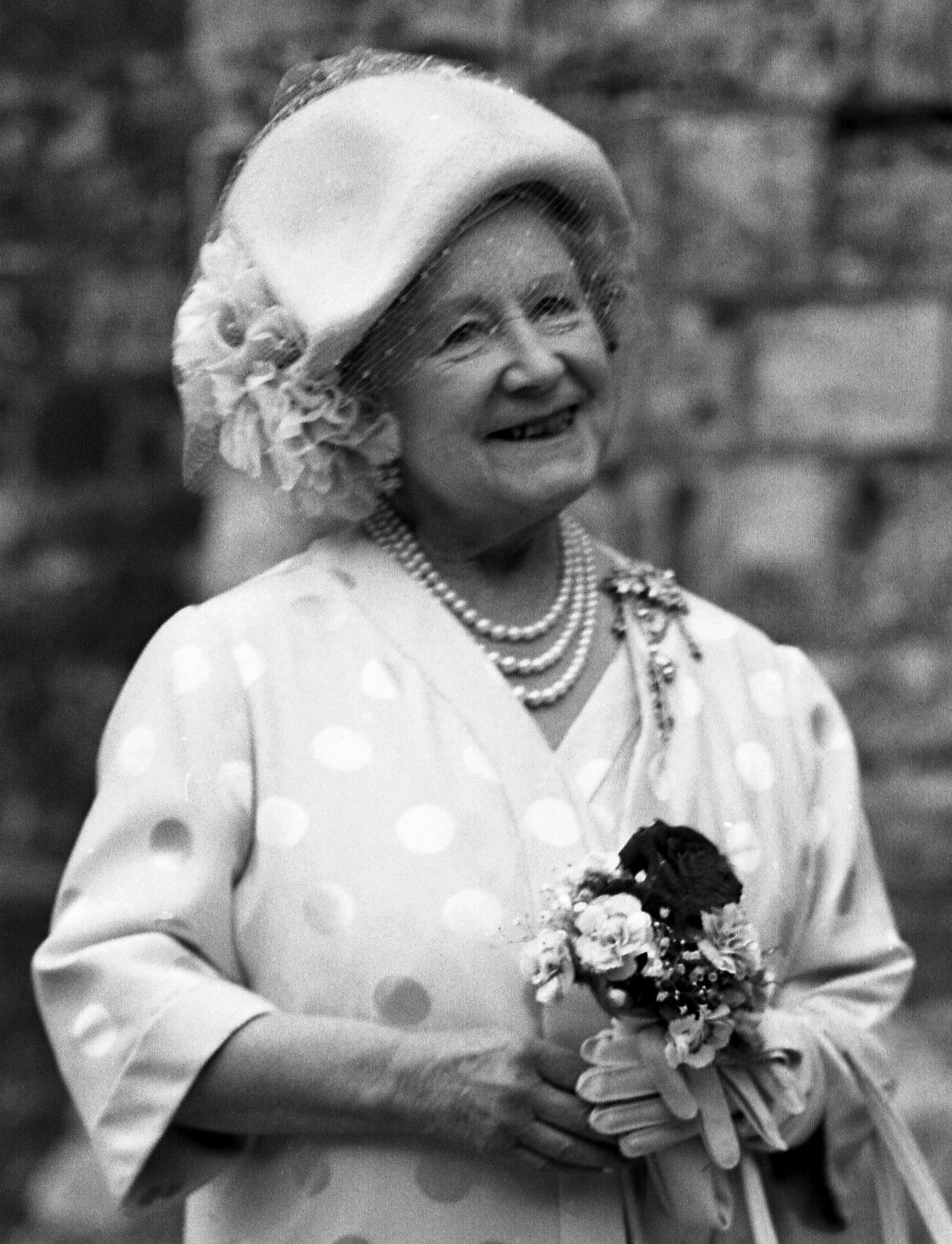
Elizabeth Bowes-Lyon was styled Queen Elizabeth the Queen Mother during her widowhood, a rare use of the term Queen Mother as an official style.

British queen mothers are queen dowagers who have been the mother of the reigning sovereign of England, Scotland or the United Kingdom. The term queen mother has been used in the English language since at least 1560. British queen mothers assume the style of "Her Majesty Queen [first name]" upon their husband's death. Moreover, a queen mother is not necessarily the mother of a queen regnant; the title applies regardless of the current monarch's gender.

== List ==
=== English queen mothers ===
==== House of Wessex and House of Denmark ====
Portrait	Name	Father	House by birth	Birth	Became queen mother	Ceased to be queen mother	Death	Spouse	Sovereign issue
	Ælfthryth	Ordgar, Ealdorman of Devon		c. 945	18 March 978	17 November 1000 or 1001		Edgar	Æthelred the Unready
Portrait of Emma of Normandy	Emma of Normandy	Richard I of Normandy	Normandy	c. 984	17 March 1040	8 June 1042	6 March 1052	Cnut	Harthacnut
Portrait of Emma of Normandy	Emma of Normandy	Richard I of Normandy	Normandy	c. 984	8 June 1042	6 March 1052		Æthelred the Unready	Edward the Confessor

==== House of Plantagenet ====
Portrait	Name	Father	House by birth	Birth	Became queen mother	Ceased to be queen mother	Death	Spouse	Sovereign issue
Portrait of Eleanor of Aquitaine	Eleanor, Duchess of Aquitaine	William X, Duke of Aquitaine	Ramnulfids	c. 1124	3 September 1189	6 April 1199	1 April 1204	Henry II	Richard I
Portrait of Eleanor of Aquitaine	Eleanor, Duchess of Aquitaine	William X, Duke of Aquitaine	Ramnulfids	c. 1124	27 May 1199	1 April 1204		Henry II	John
Portrait of Isabella of Angoulême	Isabella, Countess of Angoulême	Aymer, Count of Angoulême	Taillefer	c. 1186 or c. 1188	28 October 1216	4 June 1246		John	Henry III
Portrait of Eleanor of Provence	Eleanor of Provence	Ramon Berenguer V, Count of Provence	Barcelona	c. 1223	20 November 1272	24 or 25 June 1291		Henry III	Edward I
Portrait of Isabella of France	Isabella of France	Philip IV, King of France	Capet	c. 1295	25 January 1327	22 August 1358		Edward II	Edward III
Portrait of Catherine of Valois	Catherine of Valois	Charles VI, King of France	Valois	27 October 1401	1 September 1422	3 January 1437		Henry V	Henry VI
Portrait of Elizabeth Woodville	Elizabeth Woodville	Richard Woodville, 1st Earl Rivers		c. 1437	9 April 1483	25 June 1483	8 June 1492	Edward IV	Edward V

==== House of Stuart ====
Portrait	Name	Father	House by birth	Birth	Became queen mother	Ceased to be queen mother	Death	Spouse	Sovereign issue
Portrait of Henrietta Maria	Henrietta Maria of France	Henry IV, King of France	Bourbon	25 November 1609	29 May 1660	10 September 1669		Charles I	Charles II

=== Scottish queen mothers ===
==== House of Dunkeld ====
Portrait	Name	Father	House by birth	Birth	Became queen mother	Ceased to be queen mother	Death	Spouse	Sovereign issue
	Ermengarde de Beaumont	Richard I of Beaumont		c. 1170	4 December 1214	12 February 1233 or 1234		William I	Alexander II
	Marie de Coucy	Enguerrand III, Lord of Coucy	Coucy	c. 1218	6 July 1249	1285		Alexander II	Alexander III

==== House of Stuart ====
Portrait	Name	Father	House by birth	Birth	Became queen mother	Ceased to be queen mother	Death	Spouse	Sovereign issue
Portrait of Joan Beaufort, Queen of Scots	Joan Beaufort	John Beaufort, 1st Earl of Somerset	Beaufort	c. 1404	21 February 1437	15 July 1445		James I	James II
Portrait of Mary of Guelders	Mary of Guelders	Arnold, Duke of Guelders	Egmond	17 January 1433	3 August 1460	1 December 1463		James II	James III
Portrait of Margaret Tudor	Margaret Tudor	Henry VII, King of England	Tudor	28 November 1489	9 September 1513	18 October 1541		James IV	James V
Portrait of Mary of Guise	Mary of Guise	Claude, Duke of Guise	Guise	22 November 1515	14 December 1542	11 June 1560		James V	Mary I
Portrait of Henrietta Maria	Henrietta Maria of France	Henry IV, King of France	Bourbon	25 November 1609	30 January 1649	3 September 1651	10 September 1669	Charles I	Charles II
Portrait of Henrietta Maria	Henrietta Maria of France	Henry IV, King of France	Bourbon	25 November 1609	29 May 1660	10 September 1669		Charles I	Charles II

=== Queen mothers of the United Kingdom ===
==== House of Saxe-Coburg and Gotha and House of Windsor ====
Portrait	Name	Coat of arms	Birth	Father (House by birth)	Spouse	Sovereign issue	Death	Years as queen mother	Notes
Portrait of Alexandra of Denmark	Alexandra of Denmark	Coat of arms of Alexandra of Denmark	1 December 1844	Christian IX, King of Denmark (Glücksburg)	Edward VII	George V	20 November 1925 80 years, 354 days	1910–1925	Preferred not to use the title
Portrait of Mary of Teck	Mary of Teck	Coat of arms of Mary of Teck	26 May 1867	Francis, Duke of Teck (Teck)	George V	Edward VIII and George VI	24 March 1953 85 years, 302 days	1936–1952	Preferred not to use the title
	Elizabeth Bowes-Lyon		4 August 1900	Claude Bowes-Lyon, 14th Earl of Strathmore and Kinghorne (Bowes-Lyon)	George VI	Elizabeth II	30 March 2002 101 years, 238 days	1952–2002	Her fifty-year widowhood is the longest that anyone has held the status of Queen Mother.
