= Isabella of Scotland, Countess of Norfolk =

Countess of Norfolk from 1225 to her death

Isabella of Scotland
- Countess of Norfolk
- Born: 1195
- Died: after October 1263
- Spouse: Roger Bigod, 4th Earl of Norfolk (m. 1225)
- House: House of Dunkeld
- Father: William I of Scotland
- Mother: Ermengarde de Beaumont

Isabella of Scotland (1195–after October 1263), also known as Isobel or Isabel, was a daughter of William the Lion, King of Scotland and his wife Ermengarde de Beaumont. She was a member of the House of Dunkeld and by marriage she was Countess of Norfolk.

== Early life ==
Isabella was born before 1195 and was the second of four children born to her father by his marriage to Ermengarde de Beaumont. Her older sister was Margaret, Countess of Kent, her younger brother was King Alexander II of Scotland and her younger sister was Marjorie, Countess of Pembroke. Isabella also had many illegitimate half-siblings from her father.

Isabella's father William the Lion had battled with Henry II of England and his younger son John of England. Due to the Treaty of Norham, 7 August 1209, King William was forced to submit to a peace and send Isabella and Margaret to England as hostages. The sisters were imprisoned at Corfe Castle along with Eleanor, the Fair Maid of Brittany, who had been under house arrest to prevent her claim on England. Isabella was only fourteen when she was sent to England and was a hostage with her sister for around 16 years. In June 1213, John sent green robes, lambskin-trimmed cloaks, and summer slippers to the three princesses.

Isabella and Margaret were both intended in marriage to John's sons and the Scots made a payment of 15,000 marks, equivalent in modern values to tens of millions of pounds, to pay for these royal weddings. The marriages of legitimate daughters should have been a powerful diplomatic and dynastic tool for William but they were now in John's control. William died on 4 December 1214 and was succeeded by his son.

The ladies were sometimes allowed to ride out under the strictest guard and were treated in good form as befitted their rank, but Isabella and Margaret's potential marriages continued to be delayed by John throughout the 1210s and early 1220s, demonstrating of his power over Scotland. This was reflected in the Magna Carta, with clause 59 promising to do justice to the Scottish king in respect of "the sisters and hostages of Alexander, king of Scotland, his liberties and his rights". Despite this legal concession, John failed to honour his word and the marriages had still not taken place by 1220. King Alexander demanded that his sisters be married as had been agreed, with the concessions that they were only required to be found 'suitable' husbands and not the royal princes that were originally promised. In December 1222, Isabella was released to spend Christmas with Alexander in Aberdeen.

== Marriage ==
Upon Isabella's release, she was required to marry English noble Roger Bigod, 4th Earl of Norfolk. All of the sisters married English nobility, whilst Alexander was required to marry Princess Joan, daughter of King John. Isabella was at least 27 years old when she married. Roger was roughly fourteen years Isabella's junior and was legally underage when the couple were betrothed. King John's son and successor Henry III of England granted Isabella property when she married Roger in May 1225. Roger became a ward of his new brother-in-law King Alexander; he held the position until 1228. Roger and Isabella's marriage was childless.

Isabella was second-in-line to the Scottish throne (after her sister Margaret) until 1227 when Margaret's daughter and namesake was born. By 1241 she was fourth in line upon the birth of her nephew Prince Alexander.

In 1245, Roger repudiated Isabella on grounds of consanguinity, but was compelled by an ecclesiastical sentence to take Isabella back in 1253. She is called "filiam regis Scotiæ" (but not named) by Matthew Paris when he recorded her husband's resumption of their marriage.

Isabella died in 1270 and she was buried at the Church of the Black Friars, London. Roger died later the same year. He was succeeded by his nephew Roger Bigod, 5th Earl of Norfolk, who was his younger brother's son.

King William's legitimate line through his four children became extinct by 1290, leading to a Succession crisis.
