= Margaret de Burgh =

Margaret de Burgh can refer to:

- Margaret of Scotland, Countess of Kent (1193–1259), daughter of William the Lion, King of Scotland and Ermengarde de Beaumont, and wife of Hubert de Burgh, Earl of Kent
- Margaret or Megotta de Burgh, daughter of the above with Hubert de Burgh, Earl of Kent
