= Marjorie of Scotland =

Marjorie of Scotland may refer to:

- Marjorie of Scotland, Countess of Pembroke (d. 1244), daughter of William the Lion, King of Scotland
- Marjorie Bruce (c. 1296 – 1316 or 1317), daughter of Robert the Bruce, King of Scots

== See also ==
- Margaret of Scotland (disambiguation)
