= Haven Street Manor =

Haven Street Manor (also Hethenstreet) is a manor house on the Isle of Wight, situated at Havenstreet within the Newchurch parish.

== History ==
It may perhaps be identified with Strete, which was held in the 12th century by the de Estur family, who granted to Geoffrey Aitard (son of Etard) and there which Geoffrey afterwards gave to the abbey of Montebourg. Matthew son of Herbert gave to the abbey of Montebourg the land of 'Streta,' which William de Estur gave and Roger de Mandeville confirmed. This he did by the wish of Joan Patrick, his wife. This or another estate called Haven Street (Hethene Street) belonged at the end of the 14th century to the Raleighs of Walpen in Chale. Thomas Raleigh died in 1398, and it followed the descent of Walpen until the death of William Raleigh in 1419.

The principal landowner in Haven Street was the late Mrs. Rylands, whose husband Mr. John Rylands built the Longford Institute for the use of the parish in 1886. Her house is now the Longford Home of Rest.
