= Ermengarde de Beaumont =

Queen of Scotland from 1186 to 1214

Queen consort of Alba (Scotland)
- Tenure: 1186–1214
- Born: c. 1170
- Died: 12 February 1233 (aged 62–63) or 12 February 1234 (aged 63–64); Scotland
- Burial: Balmerino Abbey, Fife, Scotland
- Spouse: William I of Scotland (m. 1186; died 1214)
- Issue: Margaret, Countess of Kent; Isabella, Countess of Norfolk; Alexander II, King of Scots; Marjorie, Countess of Pembroke
- Father: Richard I of Beaumont
- Mother: Lucie de l'Aigle

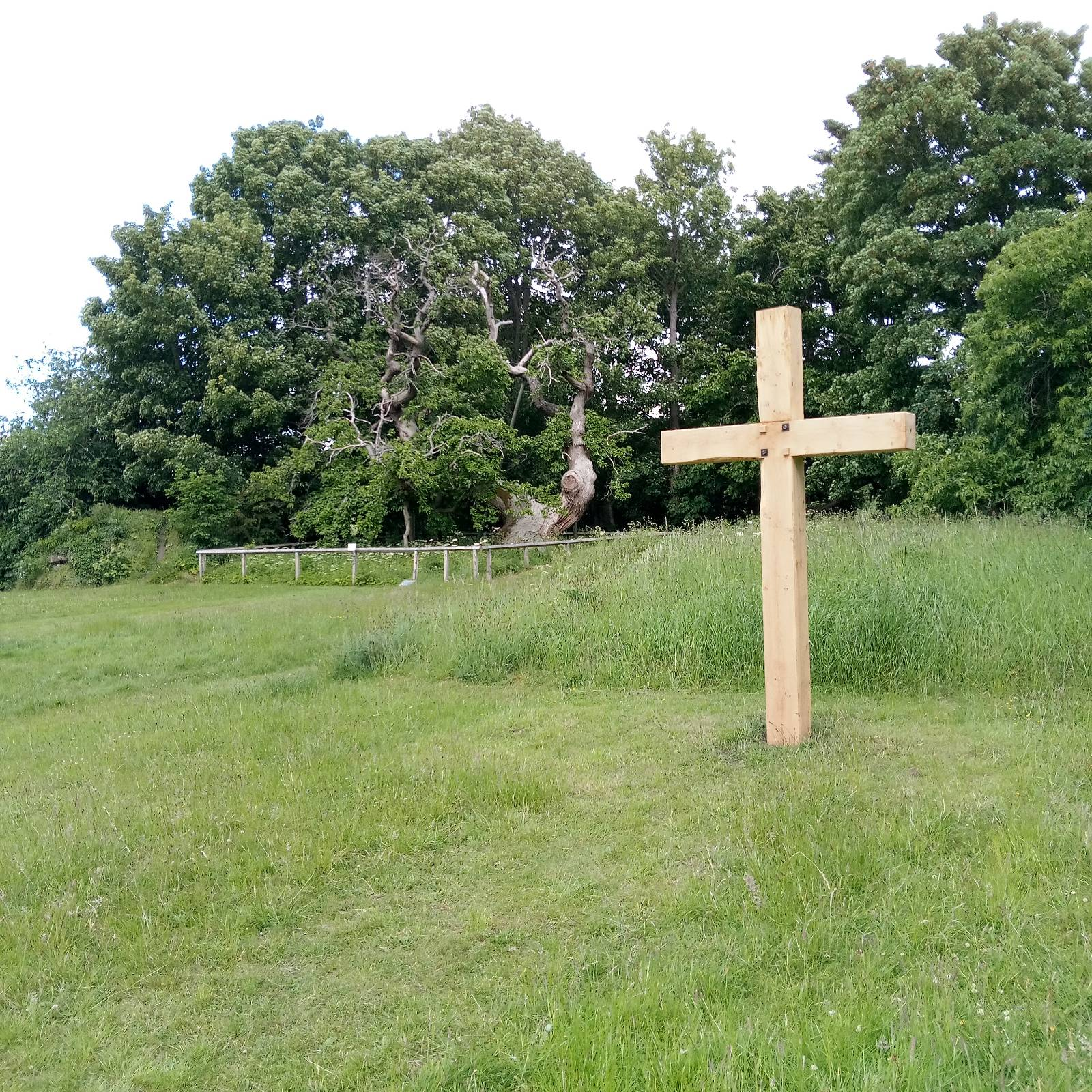
The cross that marks Ermengarde's supposed burial site at Balmerino Abbey in Fife, Scotland

Ermengarde de Beaumont (c. 1170 – 12 February 1233/1234) was Queen of Alba as the consort of William the Lion. She is reported to have exerted influence over the affairs of state as queen, though the information on her is lacking in detail. Her paternal grandmother was Constance FitzRoy, illegitimate daughter of Henry I of England.

== Life ==
Ermengarde was born c. 1170 to a minor French noble, Richard I, Viscount of Beaumont-le-Vicomte, Fresnay and Ste-Suzanne, and Lucie de l'Aigle (died aft. 1217).

Ermengarde married King William I of Scotland at the royal chapel at Woodstock Palace, near Oxford, in England on 5 September 1186, performed by Baldwin, Archbishop of Canterbury. The marriage was arranged under terms of the Treaty of Falaise by King Henry II of England, who was at the time the acknowledged overlord of Scotland. William considered her status beneath him, but agreed after Henry offered to pay for the entire wedding, land valued at 100 merks and 40 knight's fees, and to return the castles that he had forfeited as her dowry, one of them being Edinburgh. After the wedding she was escorted to Scotland by Scottish nobles and Jocelin, Bishop of Glasgow.

The chronicler Walter Bower described Ermengarde as 'an extraordinary woman, gifted with a charming and witty eloquence'. Though William had many lovers before his marriage, the aging monarch was reportedly never unfaithful to her after their wedding. The relatives of Ermengarde benefited from her status as queen. She is recorded to have presided with the Bishop of St. Andrews over a complex court case. In 1207, there was a complaint by a canon that a royal chaplain obtained the bishopric of Glasgow by bribing the King and the Queen. Queen Ermengarde is credited with mediating a renegotiation of the 1209 treaty, probably due to her husband's incapacity. Due to the illness of William, Ermengarde took over some of his duties during his later years, and there is evidence that she wielded considerable influence in public affairs. In 1212, she accompanied William with their children to King John of England to secure the succession of their son Alexander.

Ermengarde was described as distraught and lethargic over her husband's death, on 4 December 1214. As queen dowager, she devoted her time to the foundation of a Cistercian abbey at Balmerino in Fife. It was completed in 1229, and she often visited it as a guest with her son Alexander. She stayed at the abbey many times.

She died on 12 February 1233/1234, and was buried at St Edward of Balmerino Abbey, Fife.

== Children ==
Eremendgarde and William the Lion, King of Scotland had:

- Margaret of Scotland (1193–1259). Married Hubert de Burgh, 1st Earl of Kent
- Isabella of Scotland (1195–1253). Married Roger Bigod, 4th Earl of Norfolk.
- Alexander II of Scotland (1198–1249).
- Marjorie of Scotland (1200–1244). Married Gilbert Marshal, 4th Earl of Pembroke.

== Sources ==
- Parsons, John Carmi (1977). The Court and Household of Eleanor of Castile in 1290. Pontifical Institute of Mediaeval Studies. p. 77.
- Pollock, M.A. (2015). Scotland, England and France after the Loss of Normandy, 1204-1296. The Boydell Press.
- Alison Weir, Britain's Royal Families: The Complete Genealogy
- "The Kings and Queens of Scotland" edited by Richard Oram
- "Scottish Queens 1034-1714" by Rosalind K. Marshall
- "British Kings and Queens" by Mike Ashley

Scottish royalty
Preceded by Maud of Huntingdon	Queen consort of Scotland; 1186–1214	Succeeded by Joan of England
