= Patrick Galithly =

Scottish official of the 13th century

Patrick Galithly or Patrick Golightly, Burgess of Perth was a 13th-century Scottish official. He was a competitor for the Crown of Scotland.

Upon the death of the Margaret, Maid of Norway in 1290, Patrick became one of the competitors for the Crown of Scotland, deriving his claim from his father Henry, an alleged illegitimate son of King William the Lion of Scotland. Patrick withdrew his claim, on the grounds of illegitimacy, prior to King Edward I of England announcing which of the claimants would inherit the throne in 1292.
