= Margaret of Huntingdon =

Margaret of Huntingdon may refer to:

- Margaret of Huntingdon, Lady of Galloway (1194-aft.1233) daughter of David of Scotland, 8th Earl of Huntingdon and Maud of Chester; wife of Alan, Lord of Galloway
- Margaret of Huntingdon, Duchess of Brittany (1145–1201), daughter of Henry, Earl of Northumbria and Ada de Warenne; wife firstly of Conan IV, Duke of Brittany and secondly of Humphrey de Bohun

== See also ==
- Margaret of Scotland (disambiguation)
