= Marjorie of Scotland, Countess of Pembroke =

Marjorie of Scotland
- Countess of Pembroke
- Born: c. 1200
- Died: 1244
- Burial: Church of the Blackfriars, London, England
- Spouse: Gilbert Marshal, 4th Earl of Pembroke
- House: House of Dunkeld
- Father: William I of Scotland
- Mother: Ermengarde de Beaumont

Margaret "Marjorie" Marshal of Scotland, Countess of Pembroke (died 1244) was a daughter of William the Lion, King of Scotland and his wife Ermengarde de Beaumont. She was a member of the House of Dunkeld by birth and Countess of Pembroke by marriage to Gilbert Marshal, 4th Earl of Pembroke.

== Biography ==
It is not known exactly when she was born, but she was the final child of William (1142–1214) and Ermengarde de Beaumont, likely born towards the end of her father's life. In 1219, while she was a minor, there was a failed attempt to arrange a marriage to Thibault IV, Count of Champagne and Brie. Then, in 1227, there was a failed attempt with Richard, Earl of Cornwall the young brother of Henry III, King of England. There may have also been a third failed engagement in 1231, to King Henry III himself: due to the fact that Marjorie was one of three Margarets born to William the Lion (her older sister and an illegitimate daughter), it is possible this was a reference back to the 1209 agreement that the elder Margaret would marry Henry, rather than a new arrangement with the younger Marjorie. Finally, in August 1235, she married Gilbert Marshal, 4th Earl of Pembroke, the then Earl Marshal, during a ceremony at Berwick-upon-Tweed. She brought with her a substantial dowry including over 10,000 marks.

Her marriage did not produce any children, and her husband died less than six years later, during an illegal tournament on 27 June 1241. King Henry III himself ensured that she received her dower lands. While her husband was buried at the Temple Church in London, after she died in 1244, she was buried in Blackfriars, London. Her two sisters, who also married senior English nobles and also produced no heirs, were later buried alongside her.

== Ancestry ==
Ancestors of Marjorie of Scotland, Countess of Pembroke

16. Malcolm III of Scotland
8. David I of Scotland
17. Saint Margaret of Scotland
4. Henry, Earl of Northumbria
18. Waltheof II, Earl of Northumbria
9. Maud, Countess of Huntingdon
19. Judith of Lens
2. William I of Scotland
20. William de Warenne, 1st Earl of Surrey
10. William de Warenne, 2nd Earl of Surrey
21. Gundred, Countess of Surrey
5. Ada de Warenne
22. Hugh I, Count of Vermandois
11. Elizabeth of Vermandois
23. Adelaide, Countess of Vermandois
1. Marjorie of Scotland
24. Ralph VII, Viscount of Beaumont
12. Roscelin, Viscount of Beaumont
25. Adenor? de Laval
6. Richard I, Viscount de Beaumont
26. Henry I of England
13. Constance or Maud FitzRoy
27. a mistress
3. Ermengarde de Beaumont
28. Richard I de l'Aigle
14. Richard II de l'Aigle
29. Beatrice
7. Lucie de l'Aigle
15. Edelina
