= William the Lion =

King of Alba from 1165 to 1214

William I
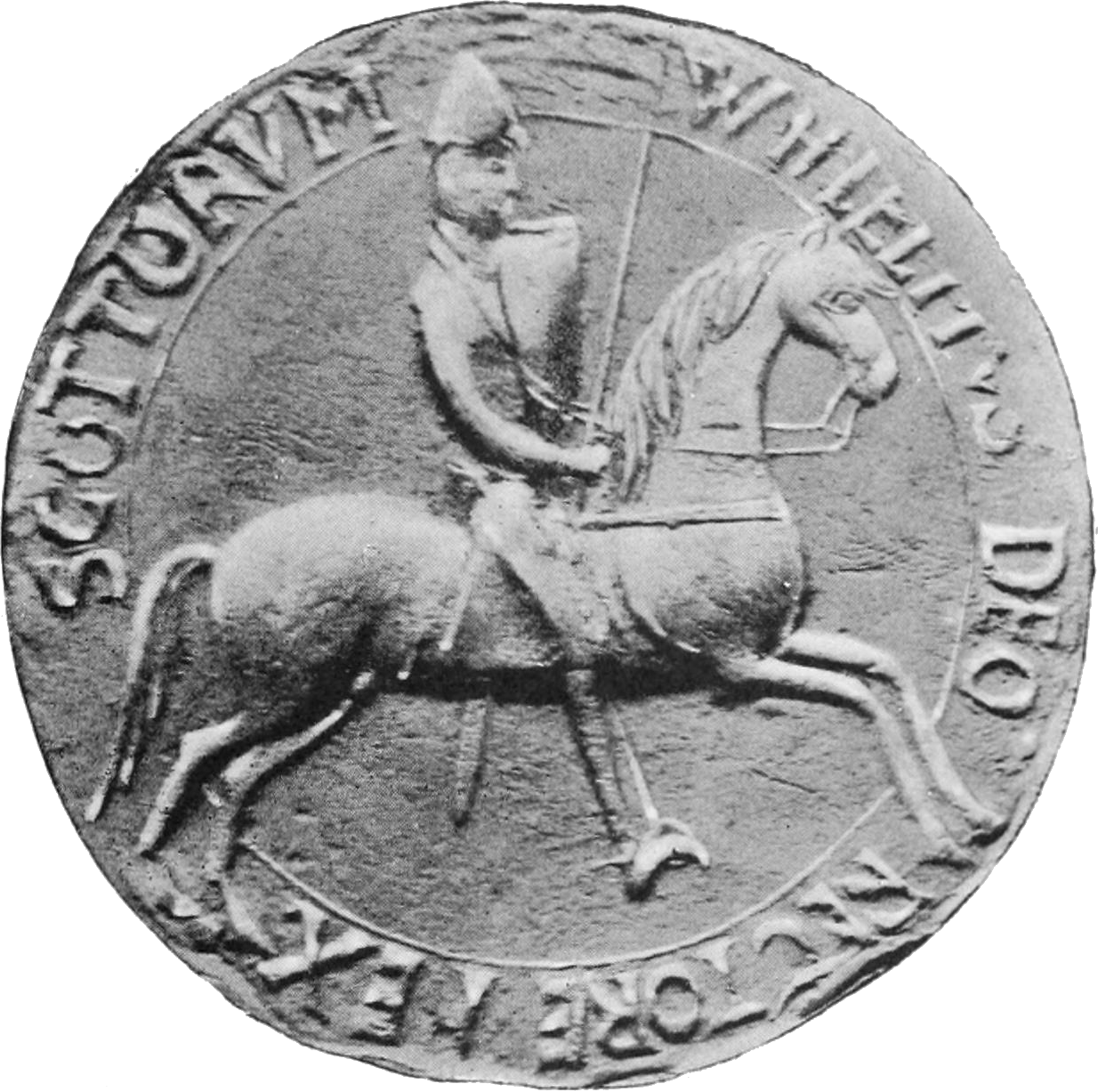
- Seal of King William

King of Alba (Scotland)
- Reign: 9 December 1165 – 4 December 1214
- Inauguration: 24 December 1165
- Predecessor: Malcolm IV
- Successor: Alexander II
- Born: c. 1142
- Died: 4 December 1214 (aged 71–72); Stirling, Scotland
- Burial: Arbroath Abbey, Scotland
- Spouse: Ermengarde de Beaumont (m. 1186)
- Issue: Margaret, Countess of Kent; Isabella, Countess of Norfolk; Alexander II; Marjorie, Countess of Pembroke; Isabella, Baroness Ros of Wark (ill.)
- House: House of Dunkeld
- Father: Henry of Scotland
- Mother: Ada de Warenne

William the Lion (Scottish Gaelic: Uilleam an Leòmhann), sometimes styled William I (Uilleam MacEanraig; Medieval Gaelic: Uilliam mac Eanric) and also known by the nickname Garbh, 'the Rough' (c. 1142 – 4 December 1214), reigned as King of Alba from 1165 to 1214. His almost 49-year-long reign was the longest for a Scottish monarch before the Union of the Crowns in 1603.

== Early life ==
William was born around 1142, during the reign of his grandfather King David I of Scotland. His parents were Henry of Scotland, a younger son of David I, and Ada de Warenne, a daughter of the powerful Anglo-Norman lord William de Warenne, 2nd Earl of Surrey and Elizabeth of Vermandois, Countess of Leicester, herself a granddaughter of Henry I of France. William was around 10 years old when his father died in 1152, making his elder brother Malcolm the heir apparent to their grandfather. From his father, William inherited the Earldom of Northumbria. David I died the next year, and William became heir presumptive to the new king, Malcolm IV. In 1157, William lost the Earldom of Northumbria to Henry II of England.

== Reign ==
Malcolm IV did not live for long, and upon his death on 9 December 1165 at age 24, William ascended the throne. The new monarch was inaugurated on 24 December 1165. His brother's steward, constable, and chancellor remained in office, and William confirmed Malcolm IV's last bequest to Dunfermline Abbey. In contrast to his deeply religious, frail brother, William was powerfully built, redheaded, and headstrong. He was an effective monarch whose reign was marred by his ill-fated attempts to regain control of his paternal inheritance of Northumbria from the Anglo-Normans.

After his accession to the throne William spent some time at the court of King Henry II; then, quarrelling with Henry, he arranged in 1168 the first definite treaty of alliance between France and Scotland.

William was then a key player in the Revolt of 1173–1174 against Henry II, which was led by Henry's sons with some short-lived assistance from Louis VII of France. In 1174, at the Battle of Alnwick, during a raid in support of the revolt, William was surprised in this encampment with only 60 men to the English 400. He recklessly charged the English troops himself, shouting, "Now we shall see which of us are good knights!" He was unhorsed and captured by Henry's troops led by Ranulf de Glanvill and taken in chains to Newcastle, then Northampton, and then transferred to Caen then Falaise in Normandy. Henry then sent an army to Scotland and occupied it. As ransom and to regain his kingdom, William had to acknowledge Henry as his feudal superior and agree to pay for the cost of the English army's occupation of Scotland by taxing the Scots. The cost was equal to 40,000 Scottish marks (£26,000). The church in Scotland was also subjected to that of England. William acknowledged this by signing the Treaty of Falaise and was then allowed to return to Scotland. On 10 August 1175 he swore fealty to Henry II at York Castle and became his liege man.

The humiliation of the Treaty of Falaise triggered a revolt in Galloway which lasted until 1186 and prompted the construction of a castle at Dumfries. In 1179, meanwhile, William and his brother David personally led a force northwards into Easter Ross, establishing two further castles, north of the Beauly and Cromarty Firths: one on the Black Isle at Ederdour; and the other at Dunkeath, near the mouth of the Cromarty Firth opposite Cromarty. The aim was to discourage the Norse earls of Orkney from expanding beyond Caithness.

A further rising in 1181 involved Donald Meic Uilleim, descendant of King Duncan II. Donald briefly took over Ross; not until he died in 1187 was William able to reclaim Donald's stronghold of Inverness. Further royal expeditions were required in 1197 and 1202 to fully neutralise the Orcadian threat.

William also quarrelled with Pope Alexander III, a quarrel which arose out of a double choice for the vacant bishopric of St Andrews. The king put forward his chaplain, Hugh, while the pope supported the archdeacon, John Scotus, who had been canonically elected. A hostile interchange followed; then, after the death of Alexander in 1181, his successor, Pope Lucius III, consented to a compromise by which Hugh got the bishopric and John became bishop of Dunkeld. In 1188, William secured a papal bull which declared that the Church of Scotland was directly subject only to Rome, thus rejecting the claims to supremacy put forward by the English archbishop.

The Treaty of Falaise remained in force for the next fifteen years. Then the English king Richard the Lionheart, needing money to take part in the Third Crusade, agreed to terminate it in return for 10,000 silver marks (£6,500), on 5 December 1189. William was then able to address the turbulent chiefs in the outlying parts of his kingdom. His authority was recognized in Galloway which, hitherto, had been practically independent; he put an end to a formidable insurrection in Moray and Inverness; and a series of campaigns brought the far north, Caithness and Sutherland, under the power of the crown.

William attempted to purchase Northumbria from Richard in 1194, as he had a strong claim over it. However, his offer of 15,000 marks (£9,750) was rejected due to wanting the castles within the lands, which Richard was not willing to give. In 1200, William did homage for Northumbria, not for Scotland, to Richard's successor, John, apparently to save face.

Despite the Scots regaining their independence, Anglo-Scottish relations remained tense during the first decade of the 13th century. In August 1209, King John decided to flex the English muscles by marching a large army to Norham (near Berwick), to exploit the flagging leadership of the ageing Scottish monarch. As well as promising a large sum of money, the ailing William agreed to his elder daughters marrying English nobles and, when the treaty was renewed in 1212, John apparently gained the hand of William's only surviving legitimate son, and heir, Alexander, for his eldest daughter, Joan.

William was in Perth when the town was flooded in the autumn of 1209 and had to be evacuated in a small boat with other members of the royal family.

== Marriage and issue ==
Due to the terms of the Treaty of Falaise, Henry II had the right to choose William's bride. In 1184, William attended Henry II's court to request a marriage to Henry's granddaughter Matilda of Saxony, daughter of Duke Henry the Lion of Saxony and Matilda of England. The proposal was referred to the pope and was forbidden on the grounds of consanguinity.

Henry instead chose Ermengarde de Beaumont, a great-granddaughter of King Henry I of England, although through an illegitimate line. They married at Woodstock Palace on 5 September 1186. Edinburgh Castle was her dowry and Henry II paid for the four days of festivities. After the wedding she was escorted to Scotland by Scottish nobles and Jocelin, Bishop of Glasgow.

The marriage was not very successful, and it was many years before they had an heir. William and Ermengarde's children were:

1. Margaret of Scotland, Countess of Kent (1193–1259), married Hubert de Burgh, 1st Earl of Kent;
2. Isabella of Scotland, Countess of Norfolk (1195–1263), married Roger Bigod, 4th Earl of Norfolk;
3. Alexander II of Scotland (1198–1249);
4. Marjorie (1200–1244), married Gilbert Marshal, 4th Earl of Pembroke.

Out of wedlock, William I had numerous illegitimate children, their descendants being among those who would lay claim to the Scottish crown.

By a daughter, name unknown, of Adam de Hythus:

1. Margaret, married Eustace de Vesci, Lord of Alnwick.

By Isabel d'Avenel:

1. Robert de London;
2. Henry de Galightly, father of Patrick Galithly one of the competitors to the crown in 1291;
3. Ada Fitzwilliam (c. 1164–1200), married Patrick I, Earl of Dunbar (c. 1152–1232); Ada predeceased her husband in 1200.
4. Aufrica married William de Say, whose great-great-grandson Roger de Mandeville was one of the competitors to the crown in 1291;
5. Isabella Mac William (born c. 1165) married Robert III de Brus (1183) then Robert de Ros (1191), Magna Carta suretor.

== Death and legacy ==
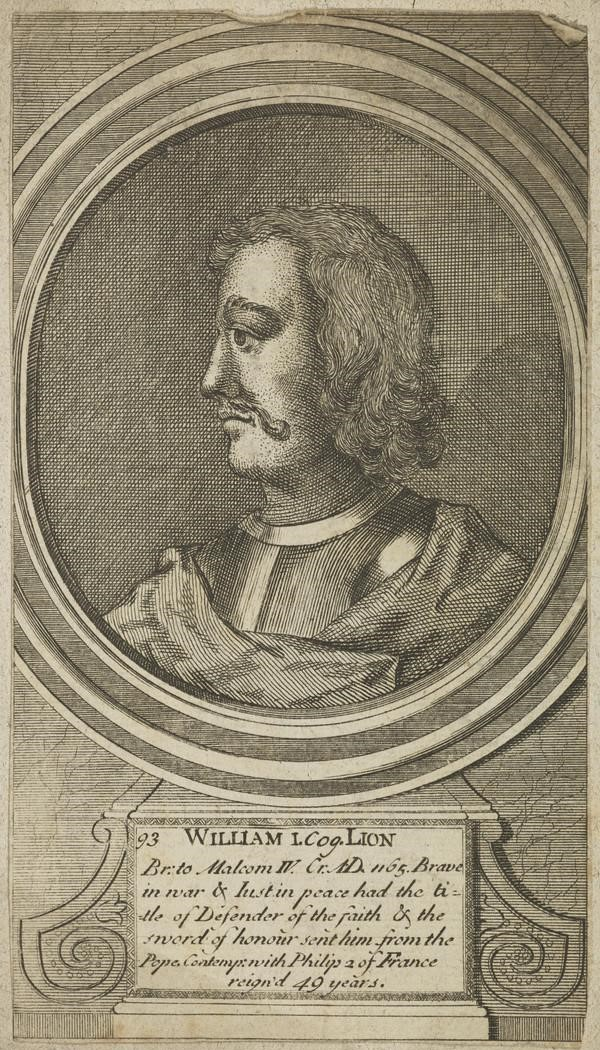
19th-century depiction of William the Lion.

William died on 4 December 1214 and was succeeded by his son Alexander.

Despite dependence on English goodwill, William's reign showed much achievement. He threw himself into government with energy and diligently followed the lines laid down by his grandfather, David I. Anglo-French settlements and feudalization were extended, new burghs were founded (for example Perth in 1210), criminal law was clarified, the responsibilities of justices and sheriffs were widened, and trade grew. Traditionally, William is credited with founding Arbroath Abbey, the site of the later Declaration of Arbroath. The Bishopric of Argyll was established (c. 1192) in the same year as papal confirmation of the Scottish church by Pope Celestine III.

William was not known as "the Lion" during his lifetime, and the title did not relate to his tenacious character or his military prowess. It was attached to him because of his flag or standard, a red lion rampant with a forked tail (queue fourchée) on a yellow background. This (with the substitution of a "double tressure fleury counter-fleury" border instead of an orle) went on to become the Royal Banner of Scotland, still used today and quartered with those of England and of Ireland. It became attached to him because the Scottish chronicler John of Fordun called him the "Lion of Justice".

== Sources ==
- Ashley, Mike. Mammoth Book of British Kings and Queens, 1998.
- Magnusson, Magnus; Scotland: Story of a Nation, 2001.

William the Lion House of Dunkeld Born: c. 1142 Died: 4 December 1214
Regnal titles
| Preceded by Malcolm IV | King of Scotland; 1165–1214 | Succeeded by Alexander II |
Peerage of England
| Preceded by Henry of Scotland | Earl of Northumbria; 1152–1157 | Forfeit |
| Preceded by Malcolm IV of Scotland | Earl of Huntingdon; 1165–1174 | Succeeded by Simon III de Senlis |
