= Richard I of Beaumont =

French nobleman

Richard I of Beaumont (died 1201) was the viscount of Beaumont, Fresnay and Sainte-Suzanne. He initially supported Arthur of Brittany against King John of England but by September 1199, he had join John's forces. It was at his castle, Bourg-le-roi, that King John gained the support of William des Roches. Richard died sometime before October 1201.

== Biography ==
Richard was the son of Roscelin de Beaumont and Constance, illegitimate daughter of King Henry I of England. As a show of favor, he exempted the monks of Saint-Etienne of Caen from any tolls. With the coronation of John as King of England in 27 May 1199, Richard, previously a supporter of Arthur I, Duke of Brittany, joined with King John's army against Arthur. At Richard's castle, Bourg-le-Roi, William des Roches parleyed with John, after his falling out with King Philip II of France. On 22 September, Richard's son-in-law, Roger IV de Tosny became a surety for John.

Richard died before October 1201.

== Family ==
Richard married Luce de L'Aigle. Richard and Luce had:

- Ralph VIII of Beaumont, who succeeded his father
- Richard of Beaumont, (d.1202)
- Geoffroy of Beaumont, made a donation to the Abbey of Sainte-Trinité de Tiron in 1241, prior to leaving for Jerusalem
- William of Beaumont, (d.1177)
- Ermengarde de Beaumont, (February 12, 1233), who married William I of Scotland
- Constance de Beaumont (d.1226), who married in 1175 Roger IV de Tosny, lord of Conches
- Pétronille, married around c. 1184 to Alain I of Penthièvre

== Sources ==
- Keats-Rohan, K.S.B. (2002). Domesday Descendants: A Prosopography of Persons Occurring in English Documents 1006-1166. Vol. II: Pipe Rolls to Cartae Baronum. The Boydell Press.
- Marshall, Susan (2021). Illegitimacy in Medieval Scotland, 1100-1500. Vol. 3. The Boydell Press.
- Pollock, M.A. (2015). Scotland, England and France after the Loss of Normandy, 1204-1296. The Boydell Press.
- Power, Daniel (2004). The Norman Frontier in the Twelfth and Early Thirteenth Centuries. Cambridge University Press.
