= Margaret of Scotland =

Margaret of Scotland may refer to:

== Nobility ==
- Saint Margaret of Scotland (1045–1093), Queen consort of Malcolm III
- Margaret of Scotland, Countess of Kent (1193–1259), who married Hubert de Burgh, Earl of Kent
- Lady Margaret of Huntingdon (died before 1228), daughter of David, Earl of Huntingdon, married Alan of Galloway
- Margaret of England (1240–1275), Queen consort of Alexander III
- Margaret of Scotland, Queen of Norway (1261–1283), daughter of Alexander III of Scotland and Margaret of England, married Eric II of Norway
- Margaret, Maid of Norway (1283–1290), Norwegian–Scottish princess, Queen of Scots
- Margaret Drummond, Queen of Scotland (1340–1375), Queen consort of David II
- Margaret Stewart, Dauphine of France (1424–1445), daughter of James I of Scotland and Joan Beaufort, married the future Louis XI of France
- Princess Margaret Stewart of Scotland (b.c.1455), daughter of James II of Scotland
- Margaret of Denmark (1456–1486), Queen consort of James III
- Margaret Tudor (1489–1541), Queen consort of James IV
- Princess Margaret of Scotland (1598–1600), daughter of James VI and I

== See also ==
- Marjorie of Scotland (disambiguation)
- Margaret of Huntingdon (disambiguation)
