= Gilbert Marshal, 4th Earl of Pembroke =

Anglo-Norman nobleman, Lord Marshal under Henry III

Gilbert Marshal
- 4th Earl of Pembroke
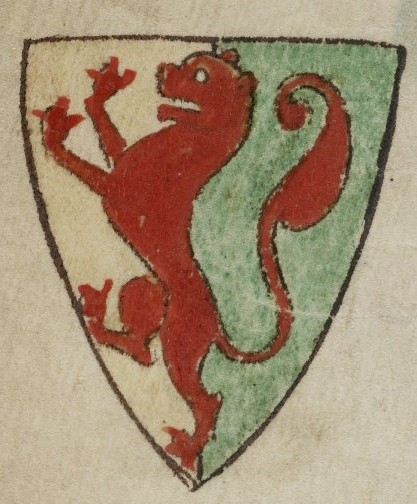
- Arms of Marshal by Matthew Paris
- Born: c. 1194/1207; Leinster
- Died: 27 June 1241; Ware Priory
- Noble family: Marshal of Hamstead
- Spouse: Marjorie of Scotland
- Issue: Isabel, wife of Rhys ap Maelgwyn of Deheubarth (illegitimate)
- Father: William Marshal, 1st Earl of Pembroke
- Mother: Isabel, countess of Pembroke

Gilbert Marshal, 4th Earl of Pembroke (c. 1194/1207 – 27 June 1241) was the third son of William Marshal, 1st Earl of Pembroke and Countess Isabel, the daughter of Richard de Clare. He was a member of the Marshal family.

== Early life ==
By calculating back from the date of his coming of age, Gilbert must have been the child with which his mother was pregnant during the insurrection against the Marshals in Leinster in 1207, and so was born in Ireland at the beginning of his father's political exile there. He would have been about twelve when his father died, and the Marshal biographer calls him then a 'clerk' which signifies he was then in minor orders.

He was credited with the title 'magister' (master) in 1234 which he only would have acquired from a period of advanced study at a major school. The name of his private tutor is known to have been Master Henry of Hoo. In 1227, he was presented to Westminster abbey's wealthy living of Oakham in Rutland at which point he was still an acolyte one of the minor clerical orders. His orders did not stop him taking a sexual partner, by whom he had a daughter Isabel. He was destined at the time for a distinguished career in the church, and indeed was reconciled to it, as he built a large mansion for himself in Oakham.

The cleric who composed the Welsh annals described him at this time as 'a very cultivated and capable young man'.

== Succession ==
When Richard his elder brother rebelled against King Henry III in the summer of 1233, Gilbert was despatched by his brother to Ireland as his agent in dealing with the Anglo-Irish barons and the king's justiciar, Maurice fitz Gerald.

At the end of 1233, Gilbert was still in Ireland when Earl Richard crossed over to counter the growing threat of the loyalists and the justiciar, during the course of which the earl was surrounded and cut down outside Kildare. Richard died of his injuries a fortnight later on 15 April 1234.

Gilbert was now heir to the earldom of Pembroke and at war with the king whose cooperation was necessary to succeed to it. Gilbert returned to Wales with his brother and through intermediaries was reconciled with King Henry at the end of May. On 11 June the king - who was the same age as Gilbert - knighted him at Worcester, thus cancelling his status as a cleric. He was created earl of Pembroke and Marshal of England immediately afterwards.

To consolidate his standing as a layman he negotiated a prestigious marriage with Marjorie (1200 – 17 November 1244), daughter of King William of Scotland. They were married on 1 August 1235 in Berwick-upon-Tweed. Their marriage was childless.

== Earl Gilbert and Wales ==
King Henry treated Gilbert generously, granting him at the end of 1234 the honour of Pevensey in compensation for the late Earl Richard's Norman and French lands, to which Gilbert was not allowed to succeed by Louis IX of France. In January 1235 the king went much further, granting Gilbert wardships and royal castles which gave him almost complete control of the southern March of Wales. Gilbert took the opportunity to settle scores with the rival Welsh lord of Caerleon, which led to an intervention by Prince Llywelyn ab Iorwerth of Gwynedd and a subsequent climbdown. On Llywelyn's death in April 1240 Gilbert launched a major campaign in West Wales, led by his younger brother Walter Marshal, which rapidly expelled Welsh troops from Cardigan castle and compelled the southern Welsh lord Maelgwyn Fychan to offer Gilbert homage. As part of the treaty Gilbert married his daughter Isabel to Rhys, son of Maelgwyn and Angharad ferch Llywelyn.

== Enmity with the Fitz Geralds and death ==
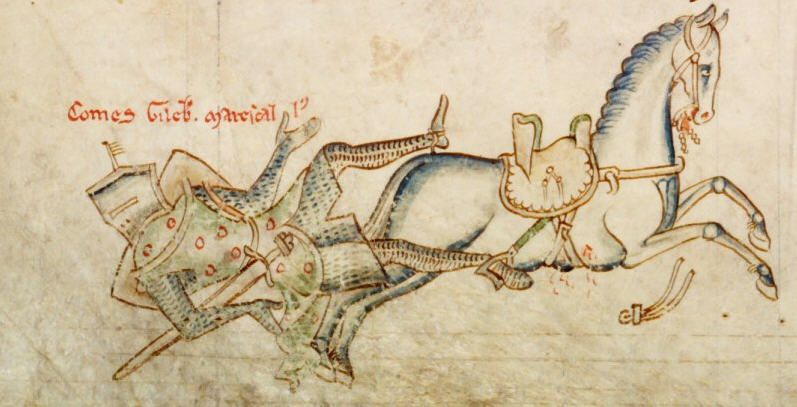
Death of Earl Gilbert - 13th century - Matthew Paris

Earl Gilbert's tenure of the earldom is notable for the consequences of the violent death of his elder brother at Kildare. Gilbert was bound in honour to punish those responsible, especially as he had to establish his credentials as a knight and the head of the powerful Marshal affinity in England, Wales and Ireland. Rather than single out Walter de Lacy and Richard de Burgh who were principally responsible for the death, he fixed on Maurice Fitz Gerald lord of Offaly and the king's justiciar, and solemnly swore mortal enmity against him. This brought the full weight of the whole Marshal clan and their powerful relatives and vassals against Fitz Gerald until he undertook to make restitution for Earl Richard's death. King Henry III was willing to act as an intermediary and in August 1234 Fitz Gerald made a formal admission of responsibility to the earl. This did not by any means end the antagonism between Gilbert and Fitz Gerald, and the murder at Westminster of Henry Clement, Fitz Gerald's agent, in 1235 was believed to have been procured by the earl. The feud was not settled until in 1240 the earl pardoned Fitz Gerald his mortal enmity on his promising to found an abbey for the sake of the soul of the late Earl Richard. Even so, the notorious antagonism between the aristocratic groups had so disturbed the political community and court that when Earl Gilbert died violently on the tournament field of Ware on 27 June 1241 it was commonly believed that agents of the Fitz Geralds had a hand in the affair. Gilbert's death was more likely the consequence of a need to justify the Marshal name and live up to his father's and brothers' reputations, for the St Albans chronicler Matthew Paris reported gossip that Gilbert was 'inexperienced and useless as a knight'. There was some truth in it, as his inability to manage the magnificent but wild Spanish stallion he had selected for the day's sport led to his being thrown from his horse and dragged for some distance on the ground. He died later that evening from the injuries received. He was buried at Temple Church next to his father. His title was passed to his younger brother Walter a year after his death. Walter was not immediately confirmed as Earl of Pembroke and Lord Marshal due to the King's anger at Walter's disobedience of royal orders, as he had also attended the tournament.

== Sources ==
- Acts and Letters of the Marshal Family 1156-1248: Earls of Pembroke and Marshals of England, ed. David Crouch, Camden Society 5th series, 47 (Cambridge: CUP, 2015).
- Cokayne, George E. (1945), The New Complete Peerage, vol. 10, St. Catherine Press Limited
- D. Crouch, 'Earl Gilbert Marshal and his mortal enemies,’ Historical Research, 87 (2014), 393-403.
- R.F. Walker, ‘The Earls of Pembroke, 1138-1389’ in, Pembrokeshire County History ii, Medieval Pembrokeshire, ed. R.F. Walker (Haverfordwest, 2002).
- Davis, Paul R. (8 March 2011), Castles of the Welsh Princes, Y Lolfa, ISBN 978-0-86243-970-5

Political offices
Preceded by Richard Marshal	Lord Marshal; 1234–1241	Succeeded by Walter Marshal
Peerage of England
Preceded by Richard Marshal	Earl of Pembroke; 1234–1241	Succeeded by Walter Marshal
