= Competitors for the Crown of Scotland =

1290-1292 succession dispute in Scotland

When the crown of Scotland became vacant in September 1290 on the death of the seven-year-old Queen Margaret, 13 claimants to the throne came forward. Those with the most credible claims were John Balliol; Robert de Brus, 5th Lord of Annandale (also spelled "Bruce"); John Hastings, 1st Baron Hastings; and Floris V, Count of Holland.

Fearing civil war, the Guardians of Scotland asked Edward I of England to arbitrate. Before agreeing, he obtained concessions going some way to revive English overlordship over the Scots. A commission of 104 "auditors" was then appointed—24 by Edward himself, acting as president; and the rest by Brus and Balliol, in equal numbers. In November 1292, the body decided in favour of John Balliol, whose claim was based on the traditional criterion of primogeniture—inheritance through a line of firstborn sons. The decision was accepted by the majority of the powerful in Scotland, and John ruled as King of Scots from then until 1296, when he was succeeded by Robert de Brus, another claimant.

== Background ==
With the death of King Alexander III in 1286, the crown of Scotland passed to his only surviving descendant, his three-year-old granddaughter Margaret (the Maid of Norway). In 1290, the Guardians of Scotland, who had been appointed to govern the realm during the young Queen's minority, drew up the Treaty of Birgham, a marriage contract between Margaret and the five-year-old Edward of Caernarfon, heir apparent to the English throne. The treaty, amongst other points, contained the provision that although the issue of this marriage would inherit the crowns of both England and Scotland, the latter kingdom should be "separate, apart and free in itself without subjection to the English Kingdom". The intent was to keep Scotland an independent entity.

Margaret died on 26 September 1290 in Orkney on her way to Scotland, leaving the throne vacant. The Guardians called upon her fiancé's father, Edward I of England, to conduct a court in which 104 auditors would choose from among the various claimants of the Scottish throne in a process known as the Great Cause (Scottish Gaelic: An t-Adhbhar Mòr). One of the strongest claimants, John Balliol, Lord of Galloway, forged an alliance with the powerful Antony Bek, Bishop of Durham, the representative of Edward I in Scotland, and began styling himself 'heir of Scotland', while another, Robert de Brus, 5th Lord of Annandale, turned up at the site of Margaret's supposed inauguration with a force of soldiers amidst rumours that his friends the Earl of Mar and the Earl of Atholl were also raising their forces. Scotland looked to be headed for civil war.

== Edward I steps in ==
To avoid the catastrophe of open warfare between Brus and Balliol, the Guardians and other Scots magnates asked Edward I to intervene. Edward seized the occasion as an opportunity to gain something he had long desired—legal recognition that the realm of Scotland was held as a feudal dependency to the throne of England. The English kings had a long history of presuming an overlordship of Scotland, harking back to the late 12th century when Scotland had actually been a vassal state of Henry II's England for 15 years from 1174 (Treaty of Falaise) until the Quitclaim of Canterbury (1189), but the legality of Edward's 13th-century claim was questionable. Alexander III, giving homage to Edward, had chosen his words very carefully: "I become your man for the lands I hold of you in the Kingdom of England for which I owe homage, saving my Kingdom" (author's italics).

In line with this desire, Edward demanded in May 1291 that his claim of feudal overlordship of Scotland be recognised before he would step in and act as arbiter. He demanded that the Scots produce evidence to show that he was not the lawful overlord, rather than presenting them with evidence that he was. The Scots' reply came that without a king there was no one in the realm responsible enough to possibly make such an admission, and so any assurances given by the Scots were worthless. Although technically and legally correct by the standards of the time, this reply infuriated Edward so much that he refused to have it entered on the official record of the proceedings.

The Guardians and the claimants still needed Edward's help, and he did manage to press them into accepting a number of lesser though still important terms. The majority of the claimants and the Guardians did eventually step forward to acknowledge Edward as their rightful overlord, even though they could not be taken as speaking for the realm as a whole. They also agreed to put Edward in temporary control of the principal royal castles of Scotland, despite the castles in question not being theirs to give away. For his part, Edward agreed that he would return control of both kingdom and castles to the successful claimant within two months. In the ongoing negotiations between the two countries, the Scots continued to use the Treaty of Birgham as a reference point, indicating that they still wished to see Scotland retain an identity independent from England.

These concessions obtained, Edward arranged for a court to decide which of the claimants should inherit the throne. It consisted of 104 auditors plus Edward himself as president. Edward chose 24 of the auditors while the two claimants with the strongest cases—Brus and Balliol—were allowed to appoint forty each.

== Claimants ==
When Margaret died, there were no close relatives to whom the succession might pass in a smooth and clear manner. Of her nearest relatives derived through legitimate descent from prior kings, all but one were the descendants of Margaret's great-great-great-grandfather, Henry, the son of king David I of Scotland; the exception was Edward I himself, who was a descendant of Malcolm Canmore's daughter Matilda of Scotland. In addition to these relatives, there were noblemen descended from illegitimate daughters of more recent Scottish kings who also made claims. Thirteen nobles put themselves forward as candidates for the throne (with those claiming the throne through illegitimate lines in italic):

- John Balliol, Lord of Galloway, son of Devorguilla, daughter of Margaret, eldest daughter of David, Earl of Huntingdon, son of Henry, Earl of Huntingdon, son of King David I. He pleaded primogeniture in legitimate, cognatic line.
- Robert de Brus, 5th Lord of Annandale, son of Isabella, second daughter of David, Earl of Huntingdon. He was regent of Scotland sometime during the minority of King Alexander III and was occasionally recognised as a tanist of the Scottish throne. In the succession dispute, he pleaded tanistry and proximity in degree of kinship to the previous monarch, his descent being a generation shorter.
- John Hastings, 1st Baron Hastings, son of Henry de Hastings, son of Ada, third daughter of David, Earl of Huntingdon.
- Floris V, Count of Holland, son of William II, Count of Holland, son of Floris IV, Count of Holland, son of William I, Count of Holland, son of Ada, daughter of Henry, Earl of Huntingdon. He claimed that David, Earl of Huntingdon, had renounced his hereditary rights to throne of Scotland.
- John "the Black" Comyn, Lord of Badenoch, son of John Comyn, son of Richard Comyn, son of William Comyn, son of Hextilda, daughter of Bethóc, daughter of King Donald III.
- Nicholas de Soules, son of Ermengarde, daughter of Marjorie, natural (but illegitimate) daughter of King Alexander II.
- Patrick Galithly, son of Henry Galithly, natural (but illegitimate) son of King William the Lion.
- William de Ros, 1st Baron de Ros, son of Robert de Ros, son of William de Ros of Hamlake, son of Isabella, natural (but illegitimate) daughter of King William the Lion.
- William de Vesci, Baron de Vesci, son of William de Vesci, son of Margaret, illegitimate daughter of King William the Lion.
- Patrick Dunbar, 7th Earl of Dunbar, son of Patrick, 6th Earl of Dunbar, son of Patrick, 5th Earl of Dunbar, son of Ada, natural (but illegitimate) daughter of King William the Lion.
- Roger de Mandeville, son of Agatha, daughter of Aufrica, an alleged natural daughter of William de Say, son of Aufrica, an alleged natural (but illegitimate) daughter of King William the Lion.
- Robert de Pinkeney, son of Henry, son of Alicia, daughter of Marjorie, an alleged natural (but illegitimate) daughter of Henry, Earl of Huntingdon.
- Eric II, King of Norway, father of Queen Margaret and son-in-law of King Alexander III.

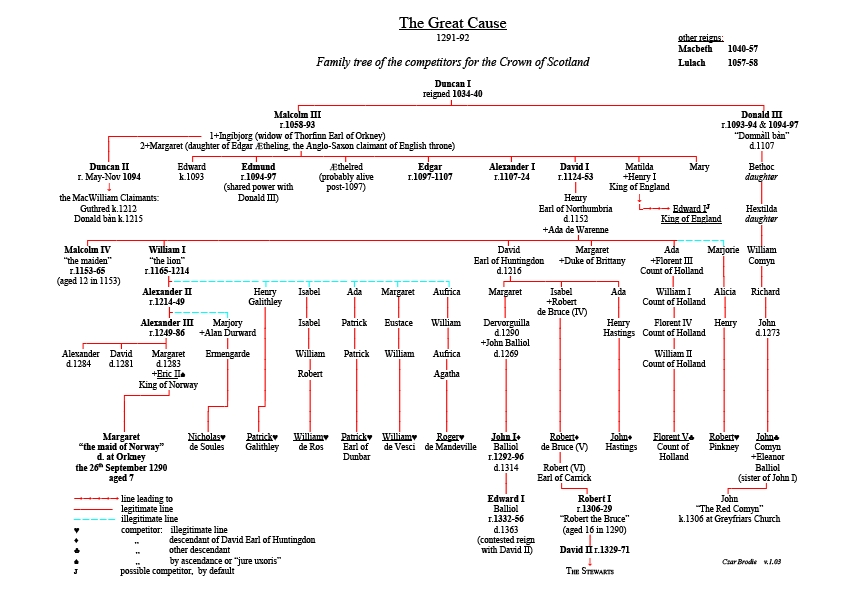
Great Cause family tree

== Claims ==
In reality only four of these men had genuine claims to the throne: John Balliol, Robert de Brus, John Hastings, and Floris V (Count of Holland). Of these only Brus and Balliol had realistic grounds on which to claim the crown. The rest merely wished to have their claims put on the legal record. These four all made their claim as being direct legitimate descendants of David I of Scotland who was the grandfather of King William the Lion. Since William had no living descendants, they made their claim as living descendants of William's brothers and sisters.

=== Dismissed Claims ===
Robert de Pinkeney's claim was dismissed as it was made through the Donald III of Scotland, uncle to David I of Scotland; and thus his degree of kinship was more remote as it was coming through the collateral line of the uncle. The claims of Nicholas de Soules, Patrick Galithly, William de Ros, Patrick Dunbar, William de Vesci, and Roger de Mandeville were dismissed since their claims of being descendants of King William the Lion were made through an illegitimate line.

The claim of Eric II, King of Norway, was also dismissed as the son-in-law of the King was not a blood relative.

John Hastings, an Englishman with extensive estates in Scotland, could not succeed to the throne by any of the normal rules governing feudal legacy; instead his lawyers argued that Scotland was not a true kingdom at all, based, amongst other things, on the tradition that Scots kings were neither crowned nor anointed. As such, by the normal rules of feudal or customary law the kingdom should be split amongst the direct descendants of the co-heiresses of David I. Unsurprisingly, a court made up of Scots nobles rejected these arguments out of hand.

Floris V's argument was that during the reign of William the Lion the king's brother David, Earl of Huntingdon had resigned the right of himself and his heirs to the throne in exchange for a grant of land in Aberdeenshire. If true, this would rule out the first three claimants, all heirs of Earl David, and give Floris the strongest claim to the throne. Floris claimed that although he did not possess copies of the documents detailing the handover of power, one must exist somewhere in Scotland, and Edward adjourned the court for a full ten months while a search was made through various castle treasuries. No such copy was found, and Floris withdrew his claim in the summer of 1292. In November 1292, following the rejection of Brus's claim, Floris then put forward his claim for a second time—this time with Brus as his backer. There is evidence that he had already entered into an agreement with Brus at the time of withdrawing his claim, in which if one of them was to successfully claim the throne, he would grant the other one third of the kingdom as a feudal fief, and Brus may have hoped that pressing Floris's candidacy for a second time might not only put Floris on the throne but give Brus a substantial consolation prize. However, Floris's case was this time rejected for lack of evidence: despite the long interval since his earlier request for an adjournment, he was unable to produce evidence of his claim—due, he claimed, to theft of the vital documents. His claim was this time thrown out for lack of evidence.

=== Claims of Balliol and Brus ===
John Balliol had the simplest, and thus, by some measure, the strongest claim of the four. By the tradition of primogeniture, he was the rightful claimant (his mother Devorguilla of Galloway had been the eldest surviving child of Margaret of Huntingdon, Lady of Galloway, herself the eldest daughter of Earl David of Huntingdon); and that tradition had become steadily entrenched in customary inheritance law both in England and Scotland over the preceding two centuries. Balliol also argued that the Kingdom of Scotland was, as a royal estate, indivisible as an entity. This was necessary to prevent the kingdom being split equally amongst the heirs, as Hastings argued.

Robert de Brus, Lord of Annandale, had the best claim to the throne according to proximity of blood. As such, his arguments centred on this being a more suitable way to govern the succession than primogeniture. His lawyers suggested that this had been the case in most successions and as such had become something of a "natural law". They also put before the court the suggestion that Alexander III had designated Brus as heir when he himself was still childless. Finally, his lawyers argued that the concept of primogeniture would only be relevant if customary law applied. Strict customary law, they said, would validate Hastings' argument, and require the kingdom to be split; if the kingdom was indivisible, customary law (including primogeniture) could not apply. Whatever the rationale for Brus's earlier nomination as heir, however, it was not considered conclusive evidence of which tradition was being followed, because at that time Devorguilla had no sons, and so Brus would have also qualified as heir by male-preference primogeniture.

As for any apparent contradiction between accepting primogeniture and rejecting partition, Edward I was unsympathetic to the argument, having himself drawn up plans for England to be inherited by his eldest daughter, should he die without sons. In November 1292, therefore, Edward ruled that customary law and primogeniture rather than proximity of blood should be used to determine the rightful heir.

Finally, in the closing days of the Great Cause, Brus did an about-turn on the matter of the divisibility of the kingdom. He had previously argued that the kingdom was indivisible; now, in view of Edward's ruling that customary law applied, Brus joined his arguments to those of Hastings, and argued that if customary law applied, the kingdom was divisible after all, and should be divided up between the heirs of Earl David's three daughters. This argument was swiftly rejected, and a verdict given in favour of Balliol as rightful king.

== Election ==
Edward delivered the judgement of the jurors on the Scottish case on 17 November 1292 in favour of John Balliol, with his son Edward Balliol becoming heir designate. This decision had the support of the majority of Scots nobles and magnates, even a number of those appointed by Brus as auditors. Of special note was the support of John II Comyn, another claimant and head of the most powerful baronial family in Scotland, who was married to Balliol's sister, Eleanor. In later years the Comyn family remained staunch supporters of the Balliol claim to the throne.

== See also ==
- Wars of Scottish Independence
