= Margaret of Scotland, Countess of Kent =

British Countess of Kent

Margaret of Scotland
- Countess of Kent
- Born: 1193
- Died: 25 November 1259 (aged 65–66)
- Burial: Church of the Blackfriars, London, England
- Spouse: Hubert de Burgh, 1st Earl of Kent
- Issue: Margaret de Burgh
- House: House of Dunkeld
- Father: William I of Scotland
- Mother: Ermengarde de Beaumont

Margaret of Scotland (1193 – 25 November 1259) was a daughter of William the Lion, King of Scotland and his wife Ermengarde de Beaumont. She was a member of the House of Dunkeld and by marriage, she was Countess of Kent.

== Early life ==
Margaret was the first child of William I of Scotland and his wife Ermengarde de Beaumont. She was an older sister of Alexander II of Scotland.

Her father had fought Henry II of England, as well as his younger son, John of England. As a result, in 1209, William was forced to send Margaret and her younger sister Isabella as hostages; they were imprisoned at Corfe Castle along with Eleanor, Fair Maid of Brittany, who had been under house arrest to prevent her claim on England. In June 1213, John sent green robes, lambskin-trimmed cloaks, and summer slippers to the three royal ladies. The ladies were sometimes allowed to ride out under the strictest guard.

Part of this arrangement was reflected in the Magna Carta, which promised to deal with the rights of Alexander and his family.

== Marriage ==
On 19 June 1221, Margaret married Hubert de Burgh. At the time of their marriage, Hubert was effectively the regent of the Kingdom of England since Henry III was too young to carry out the duties of king. Henry III finally came of age in 1227 and Hubert retired from his duties as regent. He was awarded the title of Earl of Kent and remained one of the most influential people at court.

They had only one known daughter:

- Margaret de Burgh (c. 1222 – 1237). She married Richard de Clare, 5th Earl of Hertford, but left no issue. Margaret of Scotland's line thus became extinct in 1237.

She survived her husband by sixteen years and died on 25 November 1259. She was buried at the Church of the Blackfriars of London.

From her birth to her death, Margaret was arguably either the first or second heir to the throne of the Kingdom of Scotland as one of the few living, legitimate descendants of William I. However, cognatic primogeniture was not yet the norm in Scotland and more distant relatives could well claim the throne, as they in fact did in the succession crisis of 1290 to 1292.
