= Roger de Mandeville =

Roger de Mandeville was a claimant to the crown of Scotland. He claimed to be a son of Agatha supposedly a daughter of Robert Wardone and Aufrica de Say. This Aufrica, he claimed, was an otherwise unknown daughter of William the Lion.

Upon the death of the Margaret, Maid of Norway in 1290, Roger became one of the competitors for the Crown of Scotland, deriving his claim from his great-great-grandmother, Aufrica, illegitimate daughter of William the Lion and Isabel d'Avenel, the wife of William de Say.
