= Joan of England, Queen of Scotland =

Queen of Scotland from 1221 to 1238

Joan of England
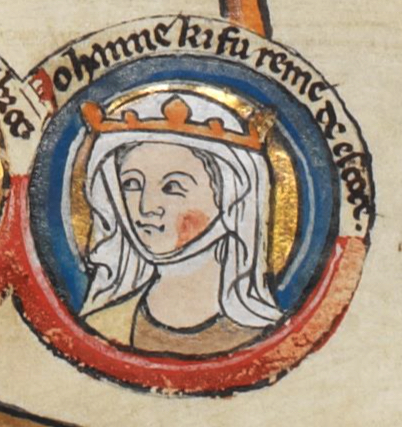

Queen consort of Alba (Scotland)
- Tenure: 21 June 1221 – 4 March 1238
- Born: 22 July 1210
- Died: 4 March 1238 (aged 27); Havering-atte-Bower, England
- Burial: Tarrant Abbey, Dorset
- Spouse: Alexander II of Scotland (m. 1221)
- House: Plantagenet
- Father: John, King of England
- Mother: Isabella of Angoulême

Joan of England (22 July 1210 – 4 March 1238), was Queen of Alba (Scotland) from 1221 until her death as the wife of Alexander II. She was the third child of John, King of England, and Isabella of Angoulême.

== Life ==
Joan was sought as a bride by Philip II of France for his son. In 1214, however, her father King John promised her in marriage to Hugh X of Lusignan, as compensation for his father Hugh IX of Lusignan being jilted by her mother Isabella. She was promised Saintes, Saintonge and the Isle of Oléron as dowry, and was sent to her future spouse in that year to be brought up at his court until marriage. Hugh X laid claim on her dowry already prior to their marriage, but when this did not succeed, he reportedly became less eager to marry her.

On the death of John of England in 1216, queen dowager Isabella decided she should marry Hugh X herself. Hugh X kept Joan with him in an attempt to keep her dowry as well as having the dowry of her mother Isabella released from the English. On 15 May 1220, after an intervention from the Pope and an agreement of the dowry, Joan was sent back to England, where negotiations for her hand with Alexander II of Scotland were taking place. Alexander had been in England in 1212, where he had been knighted by her father. It is alleged that King John had promised to give him Joan as a bride and Northumberland as her dowry.

On 18 June 1221, Alexander officially settled the lands Jedburgh, Hassendean, Kinghorn and Crail to Joan as her personal income. She and Alexander married on 21 June 1221, at York Minster. Alexander was twenty-three. Joan was almost eleven. They had no children. This fact was a matter of concern, but an annulment of the marriage was regarded as risky as it could provoke war with England. Queen Joan did not have a strong position at the Scottish court, which was dominated by her mother-in-law, queen dowager Ermengarde. Her English connections nevertheless made her important regardless of her personal qualities. Joan accompanied Alexander to England in September 1236 at Newcastle, and in September 1237 at York, during the negotiations with her brother King Henry III over disputed northern territories. At this point, chronicler Matthew Paris suggests that Joan and Alexander had become estranged and that Joan wished to spend more time in England, and her brother King Henry granted her manors in Driffield, Yorkshire, and Fen Stanton in Huntingdonshire to reside if needed. In York, Joan and her sister-in-law Eleanor of Provence agreed to make a pilgrimage to Thomas Becket's shrine in Canterbury.

Joan died in the arms of her brothers King Henry and Richard of Cornwall at Havering-atte-Bower in 1238 and was buried at Tarrant Crawford Abbey in Dorset in accordance with her wishes.

== Homages ==
Henry III continued to honour Joan's memory for the rest of his life. Most dramatically, in late 1252, almost fourteen years after her death, Henry ordered the production of the image of a queen in marble for Joan's tomb, at a great cost. This was one of the first funerary effigies of a queen in England; the tradition developed in the early thirteenth century, but the tombs of Eleanor of Aquitaine and Berengaria of Navarre were in France. Nothing now remains of the church of the Cistercian nunnery, as the abbey became - the last mention of it is before the Reformation. Legend has it that she is buried in a golden coffin located in the graveyard of the current church.

Scottish royalty
Preceded by Ermengarde de Beaumont	Queen consort of Scotland; 1221–1238	Succeeded by Marie de Coucy
