= Hubert de Burgh, Earl of Kent =

Chief Justiciar of England and Ireland (c. 1170–1243)

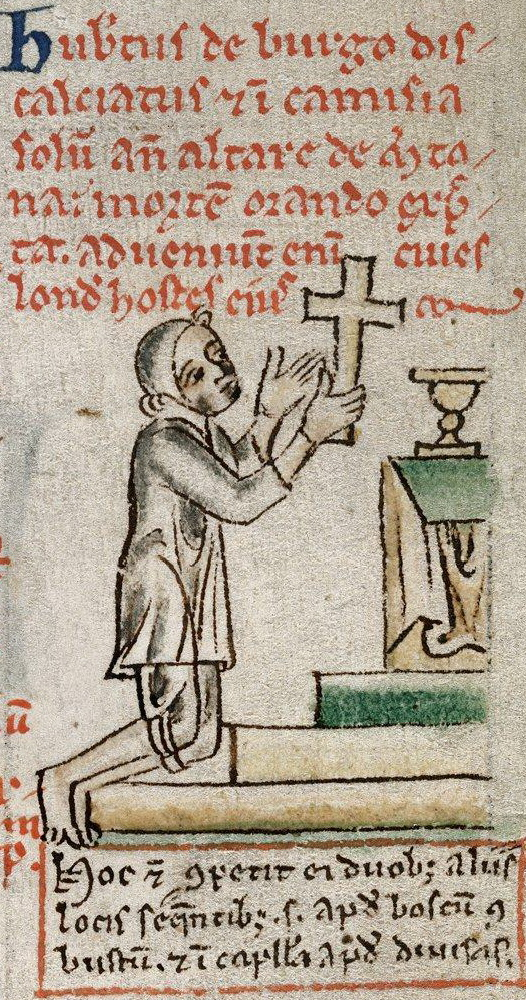
- Hubert de Burgh seeking sanctuary in 1234, by Matthew Paris, from his Historia Anglorum

Regent of England
- In office 1219–1227
- Monarch: Henry III
- Preceded by: William Marshal, 1st Earl of Pembroke

Chief Justiciar of England
- In office 1215–1232
- Monarchs: John; Henry III
- Preceded by: Peter des Roches
- Succeeded by: Stephen de Segrave

Justiciar of Ireland
- In office 16 June 1232 – August 1232
- Preceded by: Richard Mór de Burgh, 1st Baron of Connaught
- Succeeded by: Maurice FitzGerald, 2nd Lord of Offaly

Lord Warden of the Cinque Ports
- In office 1215–1220
- Preceded by: William Brewer
- Succeeded by: Henry of Braybrooke

Seneschal of Poitou
- In office 1212–1215
- Preceded by: Robert of Thornham
- Succeeded by: Geoffrey de Neville

Personal details
- Born: c. 1170
- Died: before 5 May 1243 Banstead, England
- Spouses: Beatrice de Warrenne; Isabella, Countess of Gloucester; Princess Margaret of Scotland
- Relations: William de Burgh (brother); Geoffrey de Burgh (brother); Thomas de Burgh (brother)
- Children: John de Burgh; Hubert de Burgh; Margaret de Burgh

Hubert de Burgh, Earl of Kent (English: /dəˈbɜːr/ də-BUR, French: [dəbuʁ]; c. 1170 – before 5 May 1243) was an English nobleman who served as Chief Justiciar of England (1215–1232) and Justiciar of Ireland (1232) during the reigns of King John and his son and successor King Henry III and, as Regent of England (1219–1227) during Henry's minority, was one of the most influential and powerful men in English politics in the thirteenth century.

== Origins ==
Hubert de Burgh was born of unknown parents of Burgh-next-Aylsham, Norfolk. A case has been made for Hubert's father being Walter de Burgh, and his mother was named Alice. The family were minor landholders in Norfolk and Suffolk, from whom Hubert inherited at least four manors. His elder brother was William de Burgh (d. 1206), founder of the de Burgh/Burke/Bourke dynasty in Ireland, and his younger brothers were Geoffrey (Archdeacon of Norwich and later Bishop of Ely), and Thomas (castellan of Norwich).

== Appointments by King John ==
Hubert de Burgh had entered the service of Prince John by 1198, and rose in importance in John's administration: he served successively as chamberlain of John's household, Ambassador to Portugal, Sheriff first of Dorset and Somerset (1200–04) and then of Berkshire (1202–04) and Cornwall (1202), custodian of the castles of Dover, Launceston and Windsor, and then of the Welsh Marches. For these services, he was granted a series of manors, baronies, and other castles, and became a powerful figure in John's administration.

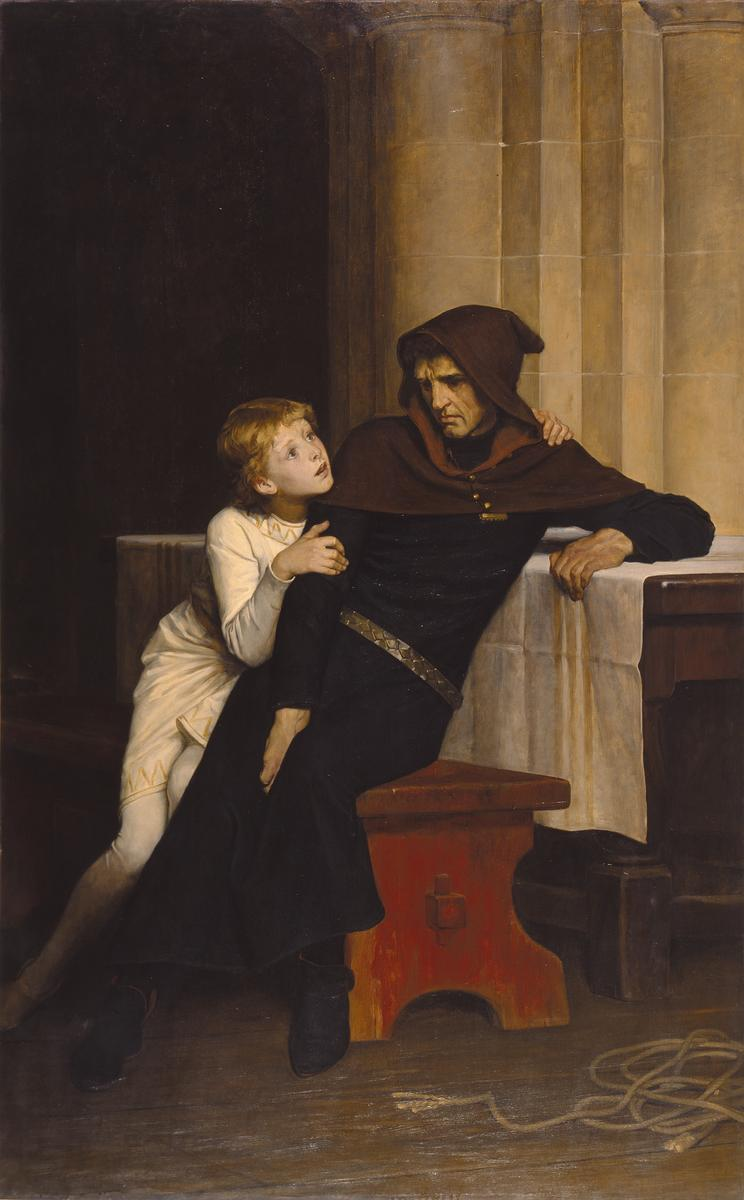
Prince Arthur and Hubert by William Frederick Yeames, 1882. Manchester Art Gallery

In 1202, de Burgh was sent to France by King John, to assist in the defense of Poitou against King Philip II of France. He was appointed castellan of the great castle of Chinon in Touraine. During this time, he served as guard of the captured Arthur I, Duke of Brittany. After almost all of Poitou had fallen to the French king, de Burgh held the castle for an entire year, until he was captured during the ultimately successful storming of the castle in 1205. He was held captive until 1207, during which time his royal appointments and grants of land passed to other men. Following his return to England, de Burgh did, however, acquire other offices in John's administration. He also acquired lands scattered throughout East Anglia, South-West England, and elsewhere, making him once again an important baron in England.

In 1212, de Burgh returned to France at first as deputy seneschal of Poitou and then as seneschal (1212–1215). He served John in his efforts to recover dominions lost to Philip II of France, until the signing of a truce between John and Philip following John's failed military campaign in France in 1214.

== Chief Justiciar of England ==
Hubert de Burgh remained loyal to King John during the barons' rebellion in the last years of his reign. In the early stages of that rebellion, John sent de Burgh to London with the Bishop of Coventry, in an unsuccessful attempt to command the people of London to resist the Barons' military advance. De Burgh and Philip d'Aubigny brought together the king's troops at Rochester, but then John made peace with the rebels. In Magna Carta (1215) de Burgh is listed as one of those who advised the king to sign, and his brother, Geoffrey (Bishop of Ely), was a witness. Hubert de Burgh is also listed as the person who would act on the king's behalf if the king were out of the country. Soon after the issuing of Magna Carta, de Burgh was officially declared Chief Justiciar of England and Ireland.

During the First Barons' War (1215–17), Hubert de Burgh served John as sheriff of Kent (1216–25) and Surrey (1215–16), as well as castellan of Canterbury and Dover. He successfully defended Dover Castle during a siege that lasted until John died (in October 1216), and the young King Henry III was crowned. He denied Louis VIII of France possession of the castle later in 1216. On 24 August 1217, a French fleet arrived off the coast of Sandwich in Kent, in order to provide Prince (later King) Louis of France, then ravaging England, with soldiers, siege engines and fresh supplies. Claiming command of the English fleet raised in response, Hubert intercepted the French fleet at the Battle of Sandwich, where he scattered the French and captured their flagship The Great Ship of Bayonne under Eustace the Monk, who was promptly executed. (This command has sometimes led to Hubert being included anachronistically on lists of the lord high admirals.) When the news reached Louis, he entered into fresh peace negotiations.

== Regent to Henry III ==
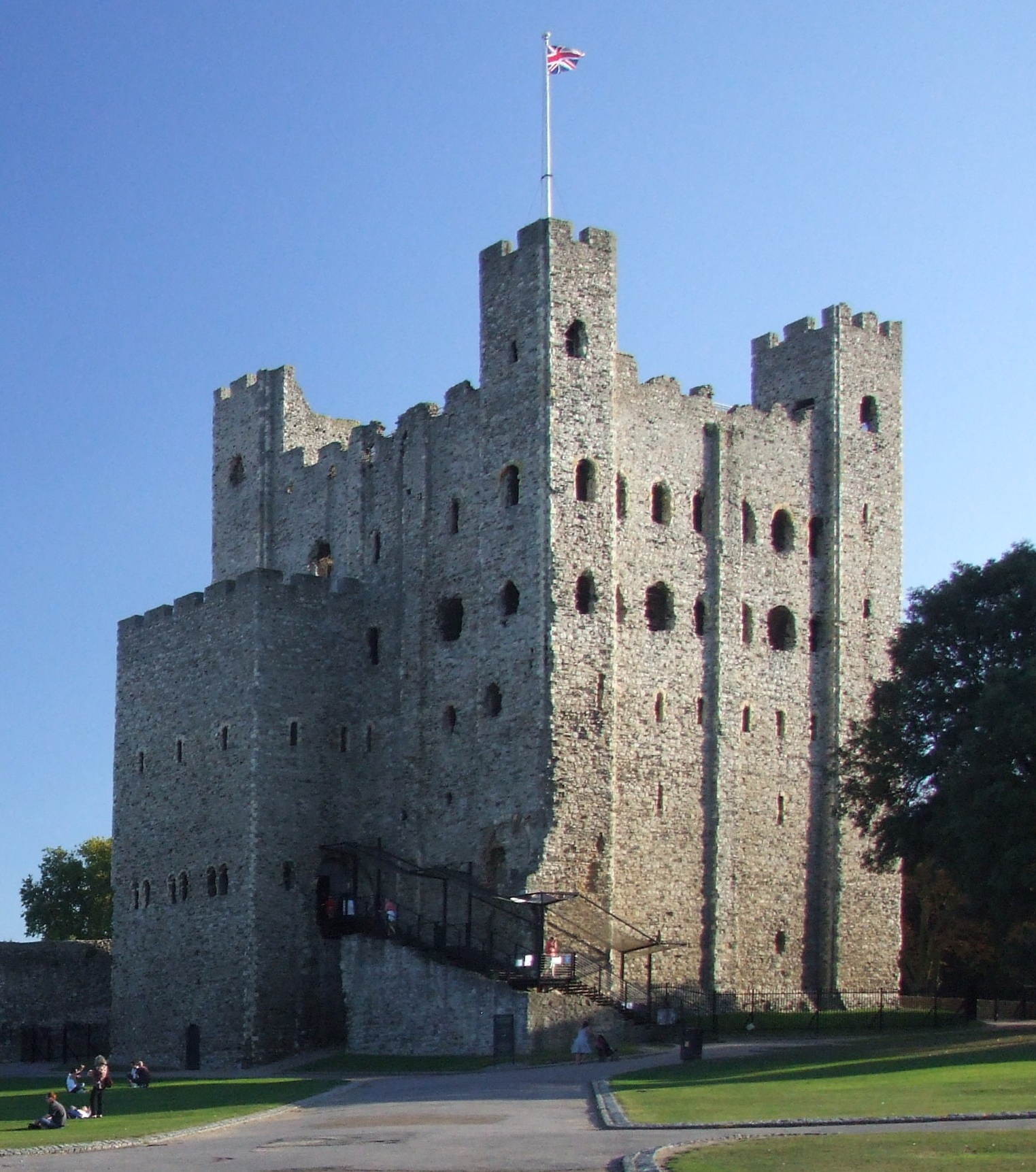
The keep and bailey of Rochester Castle

When Henry III came of age in 1227 Hubert de Burgh was appointed Governor of Rochester Castle, lord of Montgomery Castle in the Welsh Marches, and created Earl of Kent. He remained one of the most influential people at court. On 27 April 1228, he was named Justiciar for life. He was appointed Justiciar of Ireland on 16 June 1232 but never visited Ireland and he retired from this post in August 1232.

However, in 1232, his enemies' plots finally succeeded and he was removed from office and was soon imprisoned at Devizes Castle. When Richard Marshal, 3rd Earl of Pembroke rebelled against the king in 1233, the men holding Hubert de Burgh captive released him and he subsequently joined the rebellion. In 1234, Edmund Rich, Archbishop of Canterbury, effected a reconciliation. Hubert officially resigned the Justiciarship (about 28 May 1234) and no longer exercised the power of the office after September 1232. This judgment was reversed by William de Raley (alias Raleigh) in 1234, which, for a time, restored the earldom.

== Trouble with the king ==
The marriage of Hubert de Burgh's daughter, Margaret (or Megotta as she was also known), to the young Richard of Clare, Earl of Gloucester, brought de Burgh into some trouble in 1236, for the earl was still a minor and in the king's wardship, and the marriage had been celebrated without the royal licence. Hubert, however, protested that the match was not of his making, and promised to pay the king some money, so the matter passed by for the time. Eventually the marriage came to an end, by way of her death.

== Lands acquired ==
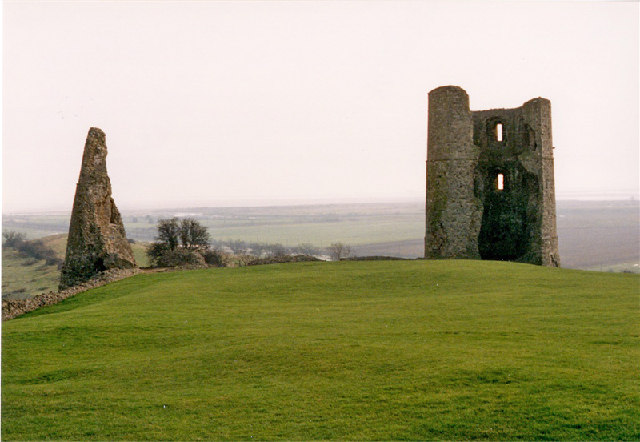
The remains of de Burgh's Hadleigh Castle near Southend in Essex

In 1206, he purchased the manor of Tunstall in Kent (from Robert de Arsic) which was later inherited by his eldest son, John de Burgh.

Hubert was appointed Constable of Dover Castle and was also given charge of Falaise, in Normandy. At Falaise he was the gaoler of Arthur I, Duke of Brittany, the nephew of King John and boy claimant to the English throne. Arthur may or may not have been murdered after leaving de Burgh's custody; his fate is unknown.

At some time before 1215, Hubert de Burgh is cited as having been appointed Lord Warden of the Cinque Ports (1215–20), which position later (after the Barons' War) included the ex officio constableship of Dover Castle. In the case of de Burgh, however, a rather long period seems to have elapsed between the two appointments.

Sometime after 1215, De Burgh started building a castle in Hadleigh having been awarded the lands by King John. A licence to crenellate was retrospectively given in 1230, at which point that original castle had been completed. After falling out with King Henry III, De Burgh was stripped of Hadleigh Castle. The castle was claimed by the monarchy and stayed in royal hands until being sold (with much of the stonework dismantled and sold) in 1551. The castle later suffered from several landslips, and the ruins are currently owned by English Heritage.

== Marriages ==
Hubert was initially betrothed to Joan de Redvers (daughter of William de Redvers, 5th Earl of Devon), but the marriage never took place and she later married William Brewer II (d. 1232), eldest surviving son and heir of William Brewer (d. 1226), who was a prominent administrator and judge during the reigns of Richard I, John and Henry III.

Hubert de Burgh married three times:

- Firstly, Beatrice (daughter of William de Warrenne) with whom he had two sons: Sir John (whose descendant, Margaret, married Richard Óg de Burgh, 2nd Earl of Ulster) and Sir Hubert (ancestor of Thomas Burgh of Gainsborough).
- Secondly (September 1217), Isabella, Countess of Gloucester (daughter and heiress of William FitzRobert, 2nd Earl of Gloucester).
- Thirdly, Princess Margaret (sister of King Alexander II of Scotland) with whom he had a daughter, Margaret, who married Richard de Clare, 6th Earl of Gloucester.

== Death ==
Hubert de Burgh died in Banstead, Surrey, in 1243, and was buried in the Church of the Friars Preachers (commonly called Black Friars) in Holborn, London.

His sons did not inherit his earldom, as the inheritance of the earldom was restricted to descendants of Hubert and his third wife, possibly because Henry III granted the title on account of Hubert marrying a Scottish princess.

== Fictional portrayals ==
Hubert is a character in Shakespeare's play King John. On screen, he has been portrayed by Franklyn McLeay in the silent short King John (1899), which recreates John's death scene; by Jonathan Adams in the BBC TV drama series The Devil's Crown (1978); and by John Thaw in the BBC Shakespeare version of The Life and Death of King John (1984). The story of his daughter's marriage is told in Edith Pargeter's novel The Marriage of Meggotta (1979). de Burgh appears as a recurrent character in The Ela of Salisbury Medieval Mystery Series by J.G. Lewis, suspected by Ela, another historical figure, of poisoning her late husband.

== Arms ==
Coat of arms of Hubert de Burgh, Earl of Kent
| Notes Clarence Ellis noted that there were three versions of Hubert de Burgh's arms: (1) Lozengy Gules and Vair; (2) Masculy Vair and Gules (as given in the Grimaldy Roll of c. 1350); and (3) Gules seven Mascles 3:3 and 1 Vair. Escutcheon Lozengy Gules and Vair. |

== See also ==
- House of Burgh – an Anglo-Norman and Hiberno-Norman dynasty founded in 1193

Government offices
| Preceded by William Marshall, 1st Earl of Pembroke | Regent of England; 1219–1227 | Succeeded by Office abolished (Majority of Henry III) |
| Preceded by Robert of Thornham | Seneschal of Poitou; 1212–1215 | Succeeded by Geoffrey de Neville |
Legal offices
| Preceded by Peter des Roches | Chief Justiciar of England; 1215–1232 | Succeeded by Stephen de Segrave |
| Preceded by Richard Mór de Burgh, 1st Baron of Connaught | Justiciar of Ireland; 1232 | Succeeded by Maurice FitzGerald, 2nd Lord of Offaly |
Honorary titles
| Preceded by William Brewer | Lord Warden of the Cinque Ports; 1215–1220 | Succeeded by Henry of Braybrooke |
| Preceded by Robert Belet | High Sheriff of Somerset; 1200–1204 | Succeeded by William de Montacute |
| Preceded by William Brewer | High Sheriff of Berkshire; 1202–1204 | Succeeded by John de Wiggenholt |
| Preceded by Richard Flandrensis | High Sheriff of Cornwall; 24 February 1202 – Easter 1202 | Succeeded by William Brewer |
| Preceded by John son of Unam of Selling; Reginald de Cornhill | High Sheriff of Kent; 1216–1225; With: Hugh of Windlesores of Warehorne and Roger Grimston | Succeeded by Hubert of Boroz; William Brito |
| Preceded by Reginald de Cornhill | High Sheriff of Surrey; 1215–1216 | Succeeded by Engelard de Cigogné |
Peerage of England
| New creation | Earl of Kent; 1227–1243 | Extinct |
