= Alexander II of Scotland =

King of Alba from 1214 to 1249

Alexander II
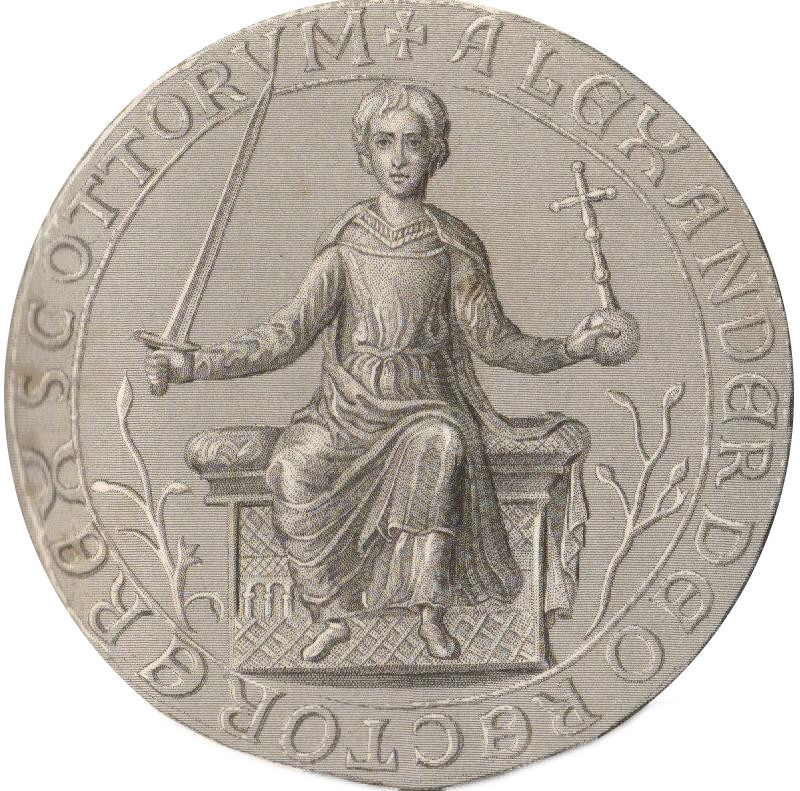
- Great Seal of Alexander II

King of Alba (Scotland)
- Reign: 4 December 1214 – 8 July 1249
- Inauguration: 6 December 1214
- Predecessor: William I
- Successor: Alexander III
- Born: 24 August 1198; Haddington, East Lothian, Scotland
- Died: 8 July 1249 (aged 50); Kerrera, Scotland
- Burial: Melrose Abbey
- Spouses: Joan of England (m. 1221; died 1238) Marie de Coucy (m. 1239)
- Issue: Alexander III of Scotland; Marjorie (illegitimate)
- House: Dunkeld
- Father: William the Lion
- Mother: Ermengarde de Beaumont

Alexander II (Medieval Gaelic: Alaxandair mac Uilleim; Modern Gaelic: Alasdair mac Uilleim; 24 August 1198 – 8 July 1249) was King of Scotland from 1214 until his death. He was the son of William the Lion and Ermengarde de Beaumont, succeeding to the throne at the age of sixteen. He ruled for thirty-five years, during which time he began consolidating the Scottish kingdom. Alexander's early reign was marked by conflict with John of England and his involvement in the First Barons' War. He supported the rebel English barons and campaigned mainly in northern England. Following John's death in 1216, Alexander made peace with John's son and successor, Henry III of England, taking a more diplomatic approach between the two kingdoms. This was strengthened by his marriage in 1221 to Joan of England.

Within Scotland, Alexander worked to reinforce his authority across a politically unconsolidated Kingdom. He eliminated repeated rebellions in Ross and Moray in the north and in Galloway in the southwest, including the final destruction of the MacWilliam line. He expanded royal control into regions where his predecessors could only exercise limited influence. Alexander extended his interventions on the western seaboard, confronting Norse-influenced lords in Argyll and the Hebrides. His dealings with England remained central to his rule. In 1237, he concluded the Treaty of York with Henry III, which settled border issues and defined the Anglo-Scottish border in largely enduring terms.

His second marriage, to the French noblewoman Marie de Coucy in 1239, aided Scotland's continental connections. In his later years, Alexander sought to extend his influence in the west, ending in a campaign against Norse possessions in the Hebrides. His intentions were cut short when he died on the island of Kerrera in 1249. He was succeeded by his seven-year-old son, Alexander. Alexander II's reign was important in the development of a more unified and territorially defined Scottish kingdom.

== Early life and background ==
=== Successional uncertainty ===
Alexander, son of King William the Lion and Ermengarde de Beaumont, was born at Haddington in Lothian. He was descended directly from Malcolm III, the first of the Canmore line of kings. Malcolm married twice. His first marriage, to the Norse noblewoman Ingibjǫrg Finnsdóttir (d. before 1068), produced a son, Donnchad mac Máel Coluim (Duncan II). The pretenders, the meic Uilleim (MacWilliams), stemmed from Duncan's line. Alexander descended from Malcolm's second marriage to Margaret of Wessex, an English princess, who produced six sons and two daughters. Of the sons, three became kings, but only the youngest, David I, had a legitimate heir—Henry, Earl of Huntingdon. Henry died before his father but left two legitimate sons, Malcolm IV, who died childless, and Alexander's father, William the Lion. By the time of Alexander's birth, succession by direct descent of the firstborn male, primogeniture, appeared to have been settled. Even King William's predecessor, his brother Malcolm—a twelve-year-old minor—had succeeded to the throne without difficulty. Yet William appears to have had doubts about Alexander's eventual succession. The reasons are unclear, though the instability created by the English succession crisis between Arthur of Brittany and John of England may have influenced his thinking. (Note: Henry II of England and Eleanor of Aquitaine had several sons: Richard I; Geoffrey, Duke of Brittany → father of Arthur of Brittany; John (later King John); Because Geoffrey was John's brother, Geoffrey's son Arthur was John's nephew. This mattered because Arthur's status as John's nephew—and, as the son of an older brother—gave him a stronger hereditary claim to the English throne under primogeniture. This is why Arthur became John's principal rival after Richard I's death.) Consequently, at a council of nobles on 12 October 1201, he secured their support to recognise the three‑year‑old Alexander as heir. This sidelined William's younger brother, Earl David of Huntingdon, who had been heir presumptive since 1165. Notably absent from the council, David did not acknowledge Alexander as heir until 1205.

=== The Norham treaties (1209 and 1212) ===
Anglo-Scottish relations deteriorated sharply in the spring of 1209. Talks originally scheduled for Newcastle were instead held at Norham Castle on the English bank of the River Tweed, ending without agreement on 23 April. By late July, both William and John, King of England, mustered their armies at Norham, each believing the other had acted provocatively. A contemporary Scottish source estimated the strength of John's forces, revealing the scale of his intimidating military display. The treaty that was concluded on 7 August 1209 was highly unfavourable to Scotland. So much so that William tried to conceal some of its provisions; it required him to reaffirm his homage to King John for his English lands, to pay 15,000 marks, and to deliver high‑ranking hostages. Alexander, approaching his eleventh birthday, was compelled to give homage to John, not only for his eventual inheritance of English lands but for his future kingdom—an acknowledgement of John as his overlord. Its terms also made clear that Margaret and Isabella, William's daughters, were already in John's charge and were to be provided for in a future marriage arrangement with John's two young sons. The prospective marriages involved various scenarios depending on the sisters' and the brothers' survivability. The daughters' status was ambiguous; despite being well received at John's court, they were effectively 'quasi-hostages', with no freedom of movement. Between 1212 and 1214, the sisters are recorded travelling with the royal court, on occasion in the company of the queen, Isabella of Angoulême, and sometimes with Eleanor of Brittany, who was being held similarly.

In January 1211, the twelve-year-old Alexander witnessed the second MacWilliam (Meic Uilleim) rebellion led by Guthred, the son of Domnall (Donald), the original dissenter. Although his forces fragmented by the autumn, Guthred himself evaded capture. As the rebellion entered its second year, William struggled to contain the uprising, perhaps raising fears regarding Alexander's succession. This ongoing instability and William's apparent inability to resolve it were likely the reasons for his need for John's assistance. In response, John's harsh terms led to the humiliating treaty of 8 February 1212, which significantly strengthened his dominance over the Scottish king. The agreement required that Alexander would marry only at John's discretion; it also stated that both William and Alexander had acknowledged John and his heir, Henry, as their overlords. Scotland was now a vassal kingdom. William had thus conceded to John the right of marriage provision for three of his four legitimate children. While the treaty omitted specific mention of John's daughter, Joan, it may have been understood that she would eventually be Alexander's wife. As required in the ratified treaty, Alexander travelled to London and was knighted along with thirteen Scottish nobles at Clerkenwell Priory on 4 March 1212. Alexander returned to Scotland with an escort of John's mercenaries to join the hunt for Guthred MacWilliam. Ultimately, the rebellion ended when Guthred was betrayed by his own followers and delivered to Alexander at Kincardine Castle, where he was executed.

== Accession and patrimony ==
By early 1213, Alexander had been introduced into royal government, witnessing charters and attending council meetings. In the summer of 1214, the ageing and increasingly infirm King William travelled north to secure the loyalty of Jón, Earl of Caithness, taking the earl's daughter as surety. His return south from Elgin was both slow and arduous, and by early September, he was unable to travel beyond Stirling Castle. Before William died on 4 December, the kingdom's leading nobles reaffirmed Alexander as heir. The next day, accompanied by seven earls and Bishop Malveisin of St Andrews, Alexander proceeded to Scone, where he was inaugurated. William's body, escorted by senior clergy and the queen, was taken to Perth, only a short distance from Scone, where on 8 December, Alexander met the cortege. The procession continued to Arbroath Abbey, where William was buried before the high altar on 10 December.

For Alexander, just a few months past his sixteenth birthday, a minority kingship was not considered. He immediately summoned a great court at Edinburgh to take oaths of fealty and to reconfirm his father's principal officers in their roles. Although his realm nominally stretched from the Pentland Firth to the Solway Firth, he inherited a loosely integrated kingdom in which effective royal authority was strongest in the southeast but weak elsewhere. The western and northern seaboards bordered the Norwegian king's island dominions from Man to Shetland, where powerful regional lords operated with considerable autonomy. Against this backdrop, discontent at Alexander's accession encouraged the MacWilliam line to revive its claim to the throne.

== MacWilliam rebellions ==
=== Origins ===
Máel Coluim mac Donnchada (Malcolm III) and his first wife, Ingibjǫrg, widow of Earl Thorfinn of Orkney, had at least two sons: Donnchad mac Máel Coluim (Duncan II) and Domnall (Donald). Little is known of this Donald, who died in 1085. The deaths of Malcolm III, his eldest son Edward of the second marriage, and Queen Margaret, all within days in November 1093, left the Scottish throne vacant. Duncan, long absent in England, initially as a hostage, was bypassed in favour of Malcolm's brother Donald III. With support from William Rufus, Duncan invaded, briefly ruled, but alienated his followers by relying on English and Norman retainers. Donald, aided by Edmund, Margaret's eldest surviving son, took the throne following Duncan's murder. Edgar, another of Margaret's sons, then seized the crown, executed Donald, and exiled Edmund.

Duncan II's son, William fitz Duncan, was excluded from the succession due to his minority, though primogeniture would have favoured him. (Note: His patronym was a convenient description used by more modern historians, based on his name as recorded in some charters, i.e., Willelmi filii Duncani.) He was also described as Willelmus nepos principis—William, nephew of the prince (i.e. David I); on other occasions, Willelmus nepos regis—William, nephew of the king. Before marrying Alice de Rumelli, he fathered Domnall mac Uilleim (Donald MacWilliam) with an unknown Gaelic woman. Domnall became the first MacWilliam rebel. (Note: Geoffrey Barrow hypothesised that William's undocumented first wife may have been a cousin or sister of Angus, Earl of Moray and thereby provided legitimacy to the MacWilliam claim to the throne through this route.)

=== Spanning two reigns ===
The crown passed through Margaret's sons to David I in 1124. William fitz Duncan, now an adult, was likely recognised as David's heir under Tánaiste principles. Yet, he remained loyal even after David's son, Henry, was styled Rex Designatus around 1141. Henry's death led to the reigns of Malcolm IV (1153) and William I (1165). The first meic Uilleim rising emerged by 1179, during William's reign and ended with the death of Donald MacWilliam in 1187. By then, the MacWilliams held significant support in Ross, Moray, and Ireland, and by 1187, some magnates considered replacing William I with a MacWilliam claimant.

Alexander II was twelve when the second uprising began in 1211, led by Donald's son Guthred. Shortly after Alexander's accession, Donald Bán and Kenneth MacHeth launched another rebellion in 1215. This was swiftly quashed by the Ross leader Fercher mac an tSacairt (Farquhar MacTaggart). (Note: For an explanation of the relationship between the MacHeths and the MacWilliams, see Alexander Grant's descriptions in Chapter 5, The Province of Ross and the Kingdom of Alba pp. 106-110, in Cowan & MacDonald, Alba:Celtic Scotland in the Medieval Era) On 15 June 1215, MacTaggart presented the rebels' severed heads to the King. This intervention demonstrated the effectiveness of the security measures implemented by King William, including the establishment of strategic lordships and castles from Inverness to Sutherland. (Note: For the likely origins of Farquhar McTaggart see Alexander Grant's details in Chapter 5, The Province of Ross and the Kingdom of Alba pp. 117-126, in Cowan & MacDonald, Alba:Celtic Scotland in the Medieval Era — see Sources section for details) These defenses, combined with the 1214 agreement with Jón, Earl of Caithness, largely stabilized the region.

The final MacWilliam rebellion erupted in 1228, when Gillescop burned Abertarff Castle and killed its governor before advancing on Inverness. Alexander II appointed William Comyn, Earl of Buchan, to end the revolt. Gillescop and his sons were killed by 1229/30. The line ended in the winter of 1230 with the execution of Gillescop's infant daughter at Forfar, the last known member of the MacWilliam line. (Note: For the year 1230 of the Lanercost Chronicle:— That same year, certain wicked men arose in Scotland, namely of the race of MacWilliam, including his sons and a certain Rotherike, staging plots in the farthest regions of Scotland and gathering many of the wicked from the same kingdom to their cause, wishing to take the throne by force. But they were delivered, with God as avenger, and their accomplices defeated. The vengeance was carried out rather cruelly in the blood of the slain. For the daughter of the same MacWilliam, still freshly born from her mother's womb, was handed over to death before the sight of the court under the voice of a herald, in the town of Forfar. Innocent, she was beheaded at the column of the cross, her brain dashed out, despite the Lord saying, 'Children shall not be killed for the sins of their fathers,' and so forth.)

== Anglo-Scottish war 1215–1217 ==
In early spring 1215, Alexander received representatives from disaffected English barons, including Eustace de Vescy, his brother‑in‑law with lands in Fife and Lothian, and Saher de Quincy, Earl of Winchester. Around this time, Eustace de Vescy and Robert de Ros—both married to Alexander's illegitimate sisters—renounced loyalty to King John, as did most northern barons. The MacWilliam rebellion remained unresolved when civil war erupted in England in early May. Alexander, an English baron through his Tynedale holdings, adopted a cautious stance, weighing gains from either faction. A truce was arranged before the end of May. On 15 June, the day Alexander received the rebels' heads, John sealed the Articles that became the Magna Carta. Clause 59 addressed grievances concerning Alexander's sisters and hostages held since the 1209 Norham treaty.

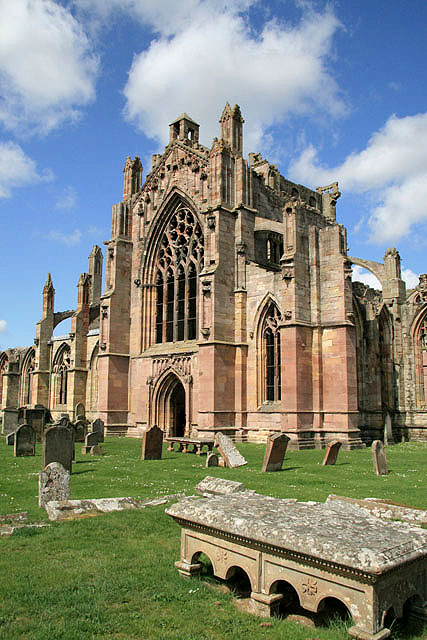
Melrose Abbey where Alexander received homage of the barons and is buried

On 7 July, Alexander sent Bishop William de Malveisin of St Andrews and five laymen to John's court to pursue the issues raised in Clause 59. They met John at Oxford in mid‑July; although the hostages were likely released, no further progress followed. On 5 September, Innocent III's commissioners excommunicated leading rebels and placed their lands under interdict. Fighting resumed, and John, backed by the Pope, retracted support for the Magna Carta, nullifying Alexander's gains. The barons, seeking his support, offered him Cumberland, Westmorland, and Northumberland—territories long sought by his father. With his interests lost, Alexander crossed the Tweed on 19 October to blockade Norham Castle. After forty days the siege was abandoned. With winter approaching, he moved south to Newcastle, bypassed its castle, and razed the town.

Provoked, John assembled Brabantian mercenaries and launched a swift winter campaign. By 4 January 1216, he reached York and captured several northern castles by 10 January. He progressed rapidly, causing the northern barons to flee into Scotland. There, they met Alexander at Melrose on 11 January and gave homage and pledges. By 15 January, John had taken Berwick and its castle, marauded Lothian, and destroyed Dunbar, Haddington, and Roxburgh. Returning to Berwick, he razed the town before retreating across the border by 25 January. His retreat was likely prompted by Alexander's army assembling near Edinburgh. John had failed to dislodge Alexander—mocked as the little red fox—or to force him to abandon the barons. Alexander pursued him to Swaledale, then returned via the Stainmore Pass across the Pennines toward Carlisle, but did not attempt entry. His army moved toward the Solway fords, where some Scots, apparently against orders, pillaged Holme Cultram Abbey, a Melrose colony—an act not repeated in his summer campaign.

On 20 May 1216, papal legate Guala Bicchieri arrived to support John. The next day, Prince Louis of France landed in Kent at the barons' invitation. By the end of the month, Bicchieri had excommunicated Louis and his allies. Louis' arrival coincided with Alexander's resumption of campaigning by returning to the siege of Carlisle in July. The town fell on 8 August, the castle by December. Soon after, Alexander left Carlisle to rendezvous with Louis. Crossing the Pennines, they briefly clashed with the holders of Barnard Castle before continuing south. Details of their rapid march are unknown, other than passing near Lincoln, where allied barons were besieging the castle. After passing close to London, they joined Louis at Canterbury shortly after 8 September and travelled to Dover, where Louis' forces were besieging the castle. There, Alexander paid homage to Louis, perhaps for Lothian and the northern counties. Alexander left for the north around early October. Meanwhile, John prepared measures to block his escape. On 19 October, Alexander's forces broke through; however, that same day, John died of dysentery, a pivotal event that shifted the war.

Many rebel barons now made peace with John's heir, Henry III. In November 1216, Bicchieri placed Scotland under interdict. In September, Louis made peace with Henry and returned to France. In December 1217 at Berwick, Alexander agreed to surrender Carlisle in exchange for absolution. Henry received him at Northampton around 19 December, accepting his submission and homage for Tynedale and Huntingdon. The removal of papal sanctions on Scotland began in early 1218.

== Post-war dealings with England ==
The amity between the Scottish and English crowns began to unravel in 1232 with the fall of Alexander's powerful brother-in-law, Hubert de Burgh. Henry readily agreed to the marriage of Alexander's youngest sister, Margaret (sometimes known as Marjory), to Gilbert the Marshall in 1235—this was the Margaret that Henry himself had agreed to marry in 1231. Following the marriage, Gilbert left Henry's court, seldom to return. In 1234, Alexander sought full implementation of the English requirements of the 1209 treaty. This prompted Henry to remind the papacy of English claims of overlordship and the contents of the treaties of 1174 and 1209/1212. Pope Gregory IX responded early in 1235, upheld Henry's claim, and directed Alexander to pay homage to the English king as his overlord. Alexander ignored this and returned to the unresolved issues over the three northern shires and the breaches of the 1209 and 1231 agreements regarding the marriage arrangements for his eldest and youngest sisters. A meeting of the joint courts held at Newcastle in September 1236 was fruitless, heightening Henry's fears of a Scottish attack in northern England.

Otto de Tonengo, the pope's legate, brought the kings together at York in September 1237, and a treaty was quickly finalised. Alexander waived any demand for repayment of the 15,000 marks previously paid by his father, King William, to King John of England, which were unfulfilled agreements. As well as that, all prior matrimonial arrangements between the English and Scottish royal families—specifically, those concerning Henry, his brother Richard, Margaret, Isabella, and Marjory—were set aside. Alexander was provided with lordships in Cumberland and Northumberland worth £200 annually—comparable to a small barony—although this wasn't implemented until 1242. However, these did come with far-reaching privileges, allowing them to function almost as autonomous entities outside English law. In return, Alexander set aside all claims over the northern counties, but crucially, claims of overlordship had been dropped.

With the ambiguity of the Northern counties now settled, the position of the border between the two countries could now be agreed upon—this may have been achieved in 1249, leaving only small pockets of land in contention. This laid the foundation of an unprecedented, uninterrupted peace that began in 1217 and lasted beyond Alexander's son's death in 1286, to 1296. Queen Joan died on 4 March 1238, and Alexander remarried in May 1239 to Marie de Coucy, daughter of a prominent French noble. The marriage sparked English concerns about a potential alliance between Alexander and Louis IX, bringing the kingdoms to the edge of war in 1244. The situation was resolved when both kings met at Newcastle on 14 August 1244. The resulting treaty outlined Alexander's pledge to refrain from future hostilities against Henry, except in defence of Scottish interests. Additionally, it was agreed that Alexander's son, also named Alexander, would eventually marry Henry's first-born daughter, Margaret.

== Consolidation ==
=== North and west ===
Alexander inherited an amorphous, loosely held kingdom in which his authority barely extended beyond its southeastern core. The semi-independent brothers Alan and Thomas of Galloway were deploying their substantial land and naval forces against the Kingdom of Man and the Isles. Alexander probably approved of this, as it promised the combined advantages of suppressing the MacWilliam support within the Irish Sea zone while expanding his influence over the Firth of Clyde region—a prerequisite for dominating southwest Argyll and the southern isles. Between 1214 and 1230 Alexander continued his policy of de-stabilising the Manx kingdom by his continued approval of Alan, lord of Galloway and also Ferchar mac an t-saggairt, now earl of Ross, in their Manx activities. Alan and Ferchar had their separate agendas but never seemed to have been at odds with one another, and both retained Alexander's favour.

In early 1221, Alexander was at Inverness to put down an uprising by Donald MacNeil, of whom nothing else is known. By April, Alexander had returned south to Perth, possibly concluding his campaign. That he was able to attend his wedding in York in June, being accompanied by his northern commander, William Comyn, Earl of Buchan, suggests that it had been. In the summer months of 1221 and 1222, Alexander, together with Alan and Thomas of Galloway, called out the levies of Lothian and Galloway and sailed against Ruaidhri mac Raonaill, lord of Kintyre, and seized control of Cowal, Knapdale and Kintyre at this time. The 1222 campaign was brief, leading to Ruaidhri's expulsion from his remaining mainland territories. His younger brother Domhnall subsequently received the lordship after submitting to Alexander.

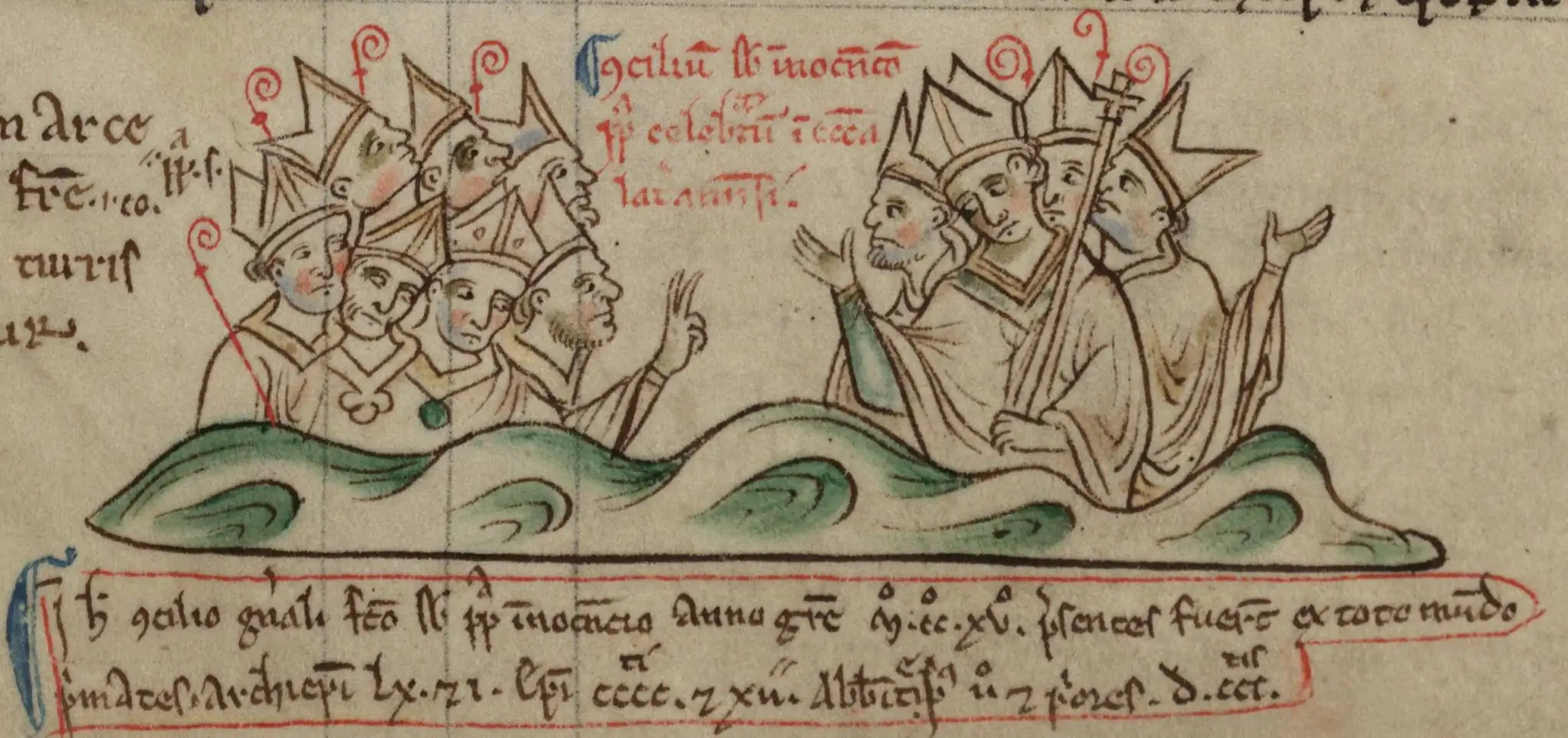
Fourth Lateran Council (Matthew Paris)

In what was likely the fourth week of September 1222, Alexander began his safe-conduct journey of pilgrimage to Canterbury. On reaching only as far as Jedburgh, he was met with the news that his bishop, Adam of Caithness, had been burned alive in his home at Halkirk by some of his parishioners on 11 September. Adam had been one of only four Scottish bishops who attended the Fourth Lateran Council in Rome that opened on 11 November 1215, and it was at this council that changes involving tiend payments were agreed. (Note: Bishop Adam of Caithness was one of only four Scottish bishops to attend the Fourth Lateran Council. It opened on 11 November 1215, and on 30 November, the 70 constitutions were approved. Those concerning tithes, (tiends in Scotland), were: Canon 53 – On those who give their fields to others to be cultivated to avoid tithes; Canon 54 – Tithes should be paid before taxes; Canon 55 – Tithes are to be paid on lands acquired, notwithstanding privileges (see Canons 57 and 58); Canon 56 – A parish priest shall not lose a tithe on account of some people making a pact; Canon 57 – Interpreting the words of privileges; Canon 58 – On the same in favour of bishops) His application of the Lateran Council's canons was responsible for the free peasant farmers' revolt against the church in Caithness and the bishop's death. Jón, Earl of Caithness and Jarl of Orkney, did not intervene to prevent the murder. Alexander immediately marched an army, gathered as he travelled, north to Caithness, where he brutally maimed those responsible and confiscated a significant portion of Jón's lands. Norwegian sovereignty over Jón's Orkney jarldom was reasserted after his father died in 1206. In contrast, Scottish authority had declined in Caithness while Alexander focused on events in England. This incident had the two-fold effect of reaffirming Alexander's primacy over Jón's Caithness and communicating this firmly to Norway. (Note: When Bishop Adam of Caithness took up his post in 1213, his Scottish diocese of Caithness interfaced with the Norse bishopric of Orkney. Jarl Jón of Orkney was the common denominator.)

By around 1225, the western seaboard saw further consolidation as the meic Dubhghaills (MacDougalls), descendants of Somerled, King of the Isles, reappeared in records, after a gap of fifty years, as a dominant force. This was marked by the emergence of Donnchadh mac Dubhghaill (Duncan MacDougall) as the lord of Lorn and a prominent ally of King Alexander. (Note: Evidently, Donnchadh was the first to bear the title de Ergadia (of Argyll))

=== Galloway ===
Earldoms and "provincial" lordships between 1124 and 1286
(not necessarily all at the same time)
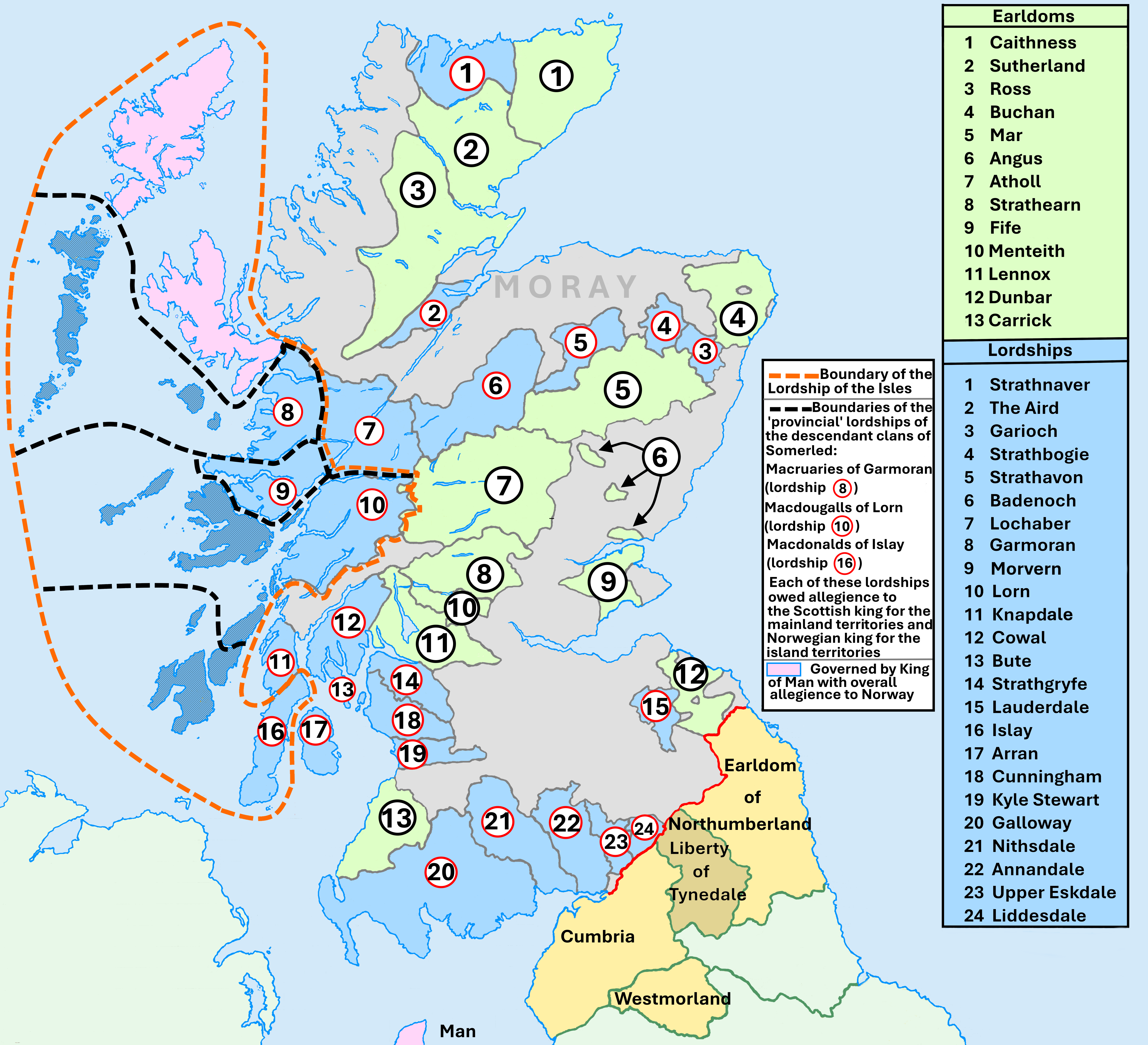

Alan, Lord of Galloway—one of Alexander's most formidable magnates—succeeded to lordships in Scotland and England, and the office of Constable of Scotland following his father Roland's death in 1200. His position was unique; while holding Cunningham and Lauderdale as a feudal vassal, his Galloway lordship remained a quasi-independent territory with its own laws and conventions. Alan was a significant figure in both kingdoms. He descended from Henry I of England and was the son‑in‑law of Alexander's uncle, Earl David of Huntingdon. Alan's influence derived less from these considerations than from his extensive cross‑border estates and his powerful military capability—operating by land and sea and drawn upon by kings on both sides of the border.

Though Alan assisted King John when their ambitions aligned, he remained Alexander's chief lieutenant during the Anglo-Scottish war of 1215–17, leading the occupation of Cumberland and Westmorland. Nevertheless, his independent political agenda and frequent absence from court caused some uncertainty. By the mid-1220s, Alan's interference in the Manx dynastic struggle between half-brothers, Ragnvald and Olaf, contributed to some of the destabilisation in the Irish Sea zone. By marrying his illegitimate son, Tomás, to Ragnvald's daughter, Alan sought to secure the Manx throne for Tomás.

News of considerable unrest in Man and the Hebrides reached King Hákon of Norway in 1229, prompted in part by Alan's renewed hostilities in the region. Hákon dispatched a force to reassert his authority, but it achieved little. In 1230–31, Alan's continued operations drew Hákon back into the conflict when his galleys re‑entered the Isles, creating a major crisis for Alexander. Hard‑won gains in the Firth of Clyde were now endangered, and King Olaf of Man — whom Alan had expended enormous effort trying to remove — was left secure in his kingdom, where he remained until he died in 1237.While joint action by Alan and Alexander averted disaster, not all the blame for this episode could be directed at Alan. The MacDougall kindred (the meic Dubhghaill), whom Alexander had promoted as one of his proxies in the Isles from 1221, were also following a personal agenda.

Following Alan's death in 1234, Alexander blocked Alan's illegitimate son Tomás's claim to a unified lordship, insisting instead on the feudal partition of Galloway among Alan's legitimate daughters. This sparked a fierce rebellion led by Tomás in 1235 and supported by local lords eager to preserve Galloway's autonomy. In early July 1235, Alexander took his army into Galloway, but resistance was fierce; the Scottish host was nearly defeated in an ambush near Kenmore (present day Kenmure), saved only by the opportune arrival of Ferchar, Earl of Ross, who defeated the rebels. Tomás with his support fled to Ireland

Alexander's initial attempt to hold the region under Walter Comyn failed when Tomás returned with Irish reinforcements. In April 1236, a second army led by the Earl of Dunbar—supported by Alan of Galloway's close friend, Gilbert, bishop of Whithorn—finally forced the rebels to surrender. Tomás was to spend the remainder of his life in captivity, initially at Edinburgh Castle and then at Barnard Castle under the supervision of his half-sister, Dervorguilla. The rebellion's collapse ensured Galloway's full absorption into Alexander's feudal order. The king divided the lordship among Alan's three legitimate daughters—Helen, Dervorguilla, and Christiana—and their Anglo-Norman spouses. (Note: The long-term effects were profound. Through Dervorguilla's marriage to John de Balliol, the Balliol family became a dominant political force. As a descendant of David I, Dervorguilla provided the genealogical link that allowed her son, John Balliol, to claim the throne during the "Great Cause" of 1291–1292, leading to the Wars of Scottish Independence.)

== Death ==
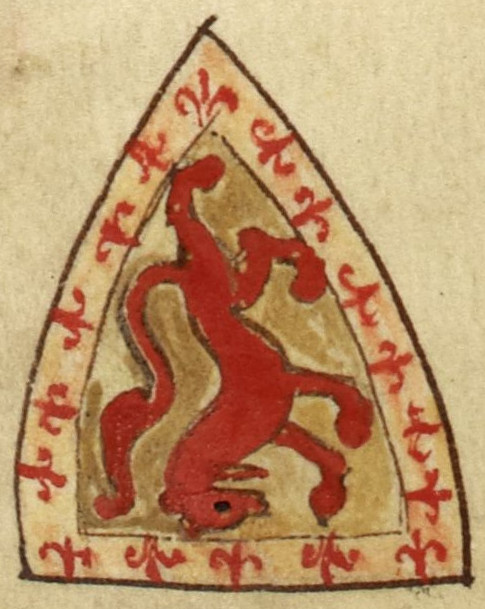
Coat of arms of Alexander II as it appears on folio 146v of Royal MS 14 C VII (Historia Anglorum). The inverted shield represents the king's death in 1249.

Eóghan mac Donnchadh meic Dubhghaill (Ewan, son of Duncan, of the MacDougall kindred) succeeded as lord of Argyll (Lorn) after his father's death, which may have been in 1237. His mainland lordship of Argyll was as a vassal of Alexander II, while his islands were held of his Norwegian overlord, Hákon IV. To the north, his kinsman Dubhghaill mac Ruaidhrí (Dougall, son of Roderic) possessed the lordship of Garmoran in the same manner. Although Alexander had remained active in the west, his final settlement with Henry III in 1244 allowed him to plan for fuller integration of the western seaboard lordships. By 1244, Alexander had consolidated the mainland territories south of Argyll into the kingdom. That year, and over the next five, he pressed his offer to buy the isles from Hákon with 'refined silver'.

From spring 1248, both Ewan and Dougall were in Bergen to press their claims to the vacant kingship of the Isles, following the death of Ruaidhrí mac Raghnaill. Ewan and Dougall remained there into the autumn, when Hákon finally came down in Ewan's favour. The king of Man had drowned in early 1249; as a temporary expedient, Hákon quickly made Ewan ruler of Man in addition to his Isles kingdom. Ewan's overt alignment with Norway, including his homage given to Hákon, and Hákon's empowerment of Ewan, a Scottish baron, made the situation intolerable for Alexander.

In February 1249, Alexander called his principal advisors together in Stirling. It may have been at this meeting, or at one held soon after, that a decision was taken to launch a joint land-and-sea action against Ewan and his lordship. Logistically, this required mustering levies, certainly from Angus but likely from other regions, and a fleet ready for a summer campaign. During Lent 1248 (4 March to 16 April), Alexander was reported as being unwell. It is not known whether this period of ill health continued into 1249; however, around the end of the first week of July, Alexander's fleet reached Kerrera, and the king was already gravely ill. He was carried ashore onto the small island, where on 8 July 1249, at about three o'clock in the afternoon, Alexander died. The king's death brought the campaign to a stop. His nobles immediately returned to the east for the inauguration of the new king, Alexander III. Alexander's body was taken back to the mainland and then to Melrose Abbey, where he was buried. (Note: The translated entry to the Chronicle of Melrose (Chronica de Mailros):— In the same year (1249), the renowned king of the Scots, Alexander, while travelling to pacify the regions of Argyll, was seized by a grave illness and was carried to the island of Kerrera, where, after receiving the ecclesiastical sacraments, his blessed soul was taken from this world and, as we believe, placed in heaven among all the saints. But his body, as he himself had ordered while still alive, was transported to the church of Melrose, and there, with royal ceremony, was committed to the bosom of the earth. In the fifty‑first year of his age and the thirty‑fifth of his reign, on the eighth day before the Ides of July (8 July), a Thursday, he departed from this life; and he left his kingdom to his son Alexander, a boy of almost eight years, who, according to the custom of his fathers, on the third day before the Ides of July (13 July) was established as king by the magnates, placed upon his father's throne, and honoured by all as the lawful heir.)

== Fictional portrayals ==
Alexander II has been depicted in historical novels:

- Sword of State (1999) by Nigel Tranter. The novel depicts the friendship between Alexander II and Patrick II, Earl of Dunbar. "Their friendship withstands treachery, danger and rivalry";
- Child of the Phoenix (1992) by Barbara Erskine;
- The Decameron by Giovanni Boccaccio, Day the Second: Third Story.

== Bibliography ==
- Barrow, G. W. S. (2015). Kingship and Unity: Scotland 1000–1306. Edinburgh: Edinburgh University Press. ISBN 978-1-4744-0181-4.
- Barrow, G. W. S. (1980). The Anglo-Norman Era in Scottish History. Oxford : New York: Oxford : Clarendon Press; New York : Oxford University Press. ISBN 978-0-19-822473-0.
- Barrow, G. W. S. (2003). The Kingdom of the Scots. Edinburgh [Scotland]: Edinburgh University Press. ISBN 0-7486-1802-3.
- Brown, Michael (2004). The Wars of Scotland, 1214–1371. Edinburgh: Edinburgh University Press. ISBN 0-7486-1238-6.
- Bennett, Matthew; Weikert, Katherine (2017). Medieval Hostageship, c.700–c.1500. New York: Routledge, Taylor & Francis Group. ISBN 978-1-315-53684-2.
- Carpenter, David (2020). Henry III: The Rise to Power and Personal Rule, 1207–1258. New Haven & London: Yale University Press. ISBN 978-0-300-23835-8.
- Carpenter, David (2015). Magna Carta. London & New York: Penguin Books. ISBN 978-0-241-95337-2. OCLC 893894968.
- Church, S. D. (1999). King John: New Interpretations. Woodbridge: Boydell & Brewer. ISBN 0-85115-736-X.
- Cowan, Edward J.; McDonald, R. Andrew, eds. (2003). Alba: Celtic Scotland in the Medieval Era. East Linton: Tuckwell Press. ISBN 1-86232-1515.
- Duncan, A. A. M. (2016). The Kingship of the Scots, 842–1292: Succession and Independence (Revised ed.). Edinburgh: Edinburgh University Press. ISBN 978-1-4744-1544-6.
- Duncan, A. A. M. (1978). Scotland: The Making of the Kingdom. London: Allen & Unwin. ISBN 0-05-003183-X.
- Duncan, AAM; Brown, AL (1959). "Argyll and the Isles in the Earlier Middle Ages" (PDF). Proceedings of the Society of Antiquaries of Scotland. 90: 192–220. doi:10.9750/PSAS.090.192.220.
- Grant, Alexander; Stringer, Keith John (1993). Medieval Scotland. Edinburgh: Edinburgh University Press. ISBN 978-0-7486-0418-0.
- Hammond, Matthew (2013). New Perspectives on Medieval Scotland, 1093–1286. Woodbridge: Boydell & Brewer. ISBN 978-1-84383-853-1.
- McGuigan, Neil (2021). Máel Coluim III, 'Canmore'. Edinburgh: John Donald. ISBN 978-1-910900-19-2.
- McKechnie, William Sharp (1914). Magna Carta: A Commentary on the Great Charter of King John. Glasgow: James Maclehose.
- McNeill, Peter G. B.; MacQueen, Hector L.; Lyons, Anona May (1996). Atlas of Scottish History to 1707. Edinburgh: The Scottish Medievalists & Dept. of Geography, University of Edinburgh. ISBN 0-9503904-1-0.
- Oram, Richard D. (2004). "Alan, lord of Galloway (b. before 1199, d. 1234)". Oxford Dictionary of National Biography (online ed.). Oxford University Press. doi:10.1093/ref:odnb/49362. (Subscription, Wikipedia Library access or UK public library membership required.)
- Oram, Richard Duncan (2011). Domination and Lordship: Scotland, 1070–1230. Edinburgh: Edinburgh University Press. ISBN 978-0-7486-1497-4.
- Oram, Richard, ed. (2001). The Kings & Queens of Scotland. Stroud: Tempus Publishing. ISBN 0-7524-1991-9.
- Oram, Richard (2012). Alexander II, King of Scots. Edinburgh: Birlinn Limited. ISBN 978-1-904607-92-2.
- Oram, Richard D. (2014). The Lordship of the Isles. Leiden: Brill. ISBN 978-90-04-27946-9.
- Oram, Richard D., ed. (2005). The Reign of Alexander II, 1214–49. Leiden: Brill. ISBN 90-04-14206-1.
- Paris, Matthew (1872). Luard, Henry Richards (ed.). Matthæi Parisiensis, monachi Sancti Albani, Chronica Majora (in Latin). Vol. 4. London: Longman.
- Prestwich, Michael (2005). Plantagenet England, 1225–1360. New Oxford History of England. Oxford: Oxford University Press. ISBN 0-19-822844-9.
- Scott, W. W. (2004). "William I (known as William the Lion)". Oxford Dictionary of National Biography (online ed.). Oxford University Press. doi:10.1093/ref:odnb/29554. (Subscription, Wikipedia Library access or UK public library membership required.)
- Scott, W. W. (1971). "Fordun's Description of the Inauguration of Alexander II". Scottish Historical Review. 1: 198–200.
- Skene, William F. (1886). Celtic Scotland: A History of Ancient Alban. Vol. 1 (2 ed.). Edinburgh: David Douglas.
- Stevenson, Joseph, ed. (1835). Chronica de Mailros. Edinburgh: Bannatyne Club.
- Stones, E. L. G. (1970). Anglo-Scottish Relations: 1174–1328. London: Oxford University Press at the Clarendon Press.* Stringer, Keith John (1985). Earl David of Huntingdon, 1152–1219. Edinburgh: Edinburgh University Press. ISBN 0-85224-486-X.
- Stringer, Keith J. (2004). "David, earl of Huntingdon (1152–1219)". Oxford Dictionary of National Biography (online ed.). Oxford University Press. doi:10.1093/ref:odnb/49363. (Subscription, Wikipedia Library access or UK public library membership required.)
- Taylor, Alice (2025). "Homage, Overlordship and the Consequences of Peace: The Treaties of Norham (1209, 1212), Anglo-Scottish Relations and the 'Scottish Clause' in Magna Carta Revisited". Journal of Medieval History. 51 (1): 25–54.
- Watt, D. E. R. (2000). Medieval Church Councils in Scotland. Edinburgh: T&T Clark. ISBN 9780567087317.
- Wormald, Jenny (2005). Scotland: A History. Oxford & New York: OUP Oxford. ISBN 0-19-820615-1.

Alexander II of Scotland House of Dunkeld Born: 24 August 1198 Died: 6 July 1249
Regnal titles
Preceded by William I	King of Scotland; 1214–1249	Succeeded by Alexander III
