= List of Kings of Uí Cheinnselaig =

The Kings of Uí Cheinnselaig were a branch of the Laigin who came to dominate southern Leinster, Ireland known also as Laigin Desgabair. They were semi-independent of their overlords in the north of Leinster and sometimes provided rulers of all Leinster.

== Kings of Uí Cheinnselaig ==
The following list is a partial list of kings of the Uí Cheinnselaig compiled from the king list in the Book of Leinster and records kept in the Annals of Ulster.

- Énnae Cennsalach
- Crimthann mac Énnai (died 483)
- ........
- Nath Í mac Crimthainn
- Óengus mac Feidlimid
- Fáelán Senchustul
- Éogan Cáech mac Nath Í
- Muiredach mac Óengusa
- Fáelán mac Síláin
- Echu mac Muiredaig
- Forannán mac Máel Udir
- ..........
- Brandub mac Echach (died 605)
- Rónán mac Colmáin (died 624)
- Crundmáel Bolg Luatha mac Áedo (died 628)
- Colgu Bolg Luatha mac Crundmaíl (died 647)
- Crundmáel Erbuilc mac Rónáin (died 656)
- Cummascach mac Rónáin (died 672)
- Bran Ua Máele Dúin (died 712)
- Cú Chongelt mac Con Mella (died 724?)
- Laidcnén mac Con Mella (died 727)
- Élothach mac Fáelchon (died circa 734)
- Áed mac Colggen (died 738)
- Sechnassach mac Colggen (died 746/747)
- Cathal mac Cináeda (died 758)
- Donngal mac Laidcnén (died 761)
- Dub Calgaid mac Laidcnén (died 769)
- Cennselach mac Brain (died 770)
- Eterscél mac Áeda (died 778)
- Cairpre mac Laidcnén (died 793)
- Cellach Tosach mac Donngaile (died 809)
- Cathal mac Dúnlainge (died 819)
- Cairpre mac Cathail (died 844)
- Echtigern mac Guaire (died 853)
- Cellach mac Guaire (died 858)
- Tadg mac Diarmata (died 865)
- Donnacán mac Cétfada (died 869)
- Cairpre mac Diarmata (died 876)
- Riacán mac Echtigern (died 893)
- Fáelán mac Guaire (died 894)
- Dub Gilla mac Etarscéoil (died 903)
- Tadg mac Fáeláin (died 922 )
- Cináed mac Cairpri (died 935)
- Bruatur mac Duibgilla (died 937)
- Cellach mac Cináeda (died 947)
- Echtigern mac Cináeda (died 953)
- Donnchad mac Taidg (died 965)
- Domnall mac Cellaig (died 974)
- Muiredach mac Riain (died 978)
- Bruatar mac Echtigern (died 982)
- Diarmait mac Domnaill (died 996)
- Donnchad Mael na mBó (died 1006)
- Diarmait mac Máel na mBó (died 1072)

== See also ==
- Kings of Leinster
