= List of rulers in the British Isles =

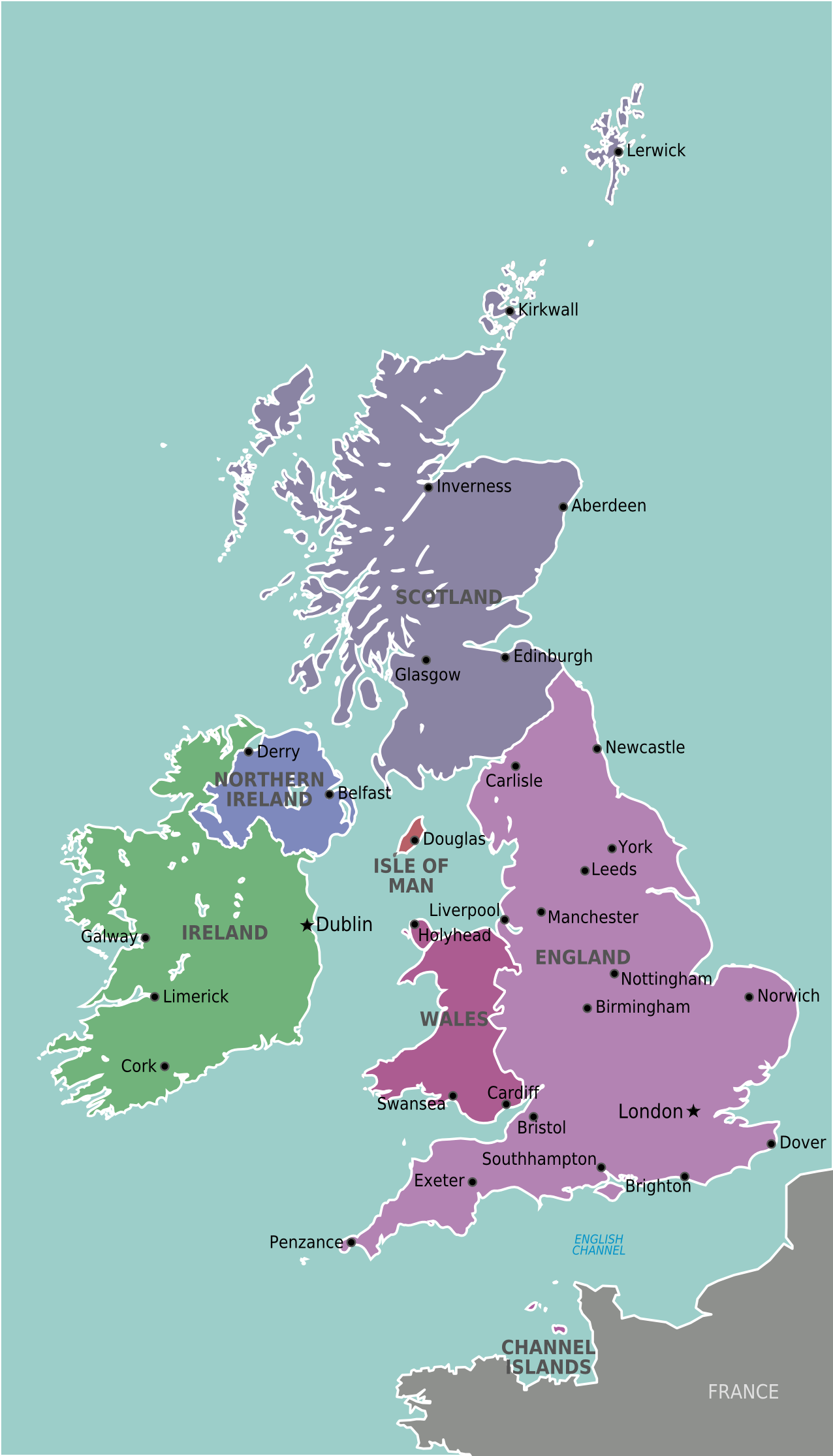
British Isles

This is a list of rulers in the British Isles. The British Isles are a group of islands in the North Atlantic Ocean off the north-western coast of continental Europe, consisting of the islands of Great Britain, Ireland, the Isle of Man, the Inner and Outer Hebrides, the Northern Isles and over six thousand smaller islands.

In 1603, King James VI of Scotland also became James I of England, joining the crowns of England and Scotland in personal union. By royal proclamation, James styled himself "King of Great Britain", but no such kingdom was actually created until 1707, when England and Scotland united to form the new Kingdom of Great Britain, with a single British parliament sitting at Westminster, during the reign of Queen Anne.

== England ==
=== House of Wessex ===
Alfred was king of Wessex from 871.

Name	Portrait	Birth	Marriage(s)	Death	Succession	Ref.
Alfred the Great c. 886 – 26 October 899		849 Son of Æthelwulf of Wessex and Osburh	Ealhswith; Gainsborough; 868; 5 children	26 October 899; Aged about 50	Son of Æthelwulf of Wessex Treaty of Wedmore	
Edward the Elder; 26 October 899 – 17 July 924 (24 years, 266 days)		c. 874 Son of Alfred and Ealhswith	(1) Ecgwynn c. 893; 2 children (2) Ælfflæd c. 900; 8 children (3) Eadgifu c. 919; 4 children	17 July 924; Aged about 50	Son of Alfred	

=== Disputed ===
There is some evidence that Ælfweard of Wessex may have been king in 924, between his father Edward the Elder and his brother Æthelstan, although he was not crowned. A 12th-century list of kings gives him a reign length of four weeks, though one manuscript of the Anglo-Saxon Chronicle says he died only 16 days after his father. However, that he ruled is not accepted by all historians. Also, it is unclear whether—if Ælfweard was declared king—it was over the whole kingdom or of Wessex only. One interpretation of the ambiguous evidence is that when Edward died, Ælfweard was declared king in Wessex and Æthelstan in Mercia.

Name	Portrait	Birth	Marriage(s)	Death	Succession
Ælfweard c. 17 July 924 – 2 August 924 (16 days)		c. 901 Son of Edward the Elder and Ælfflæd	Unmarried? No children	2 August 924; Aged about 23 (Note: Ælfweard is buried at Winchester.)	Son of Edward the Elder

Name	Portrait	Birth	Marriage(s)	Death	Succession	Ref.
Æthelstan; 924; King of the Anglo-Saxons (924–927) – King of the English (927–27 October 939) (14–15 years)	King Athelstan from All Souls College Chapel	894 Son of Edward the Elder and Ecgwynn	Unmarried	27 October 939; Aged about 45	Son of Edward the Elder	
Edmund I 27 October 939 – 26 May 946 (6 years, 212 days)		c. 921 Son of Edward the Elder and Eadgifu of Kent	(1) Ælfgifu of Shaftesbury; 2 sons (2) Æthelflæd of Damerham; 944; No children	26 May 946; Pucklechurch; Killed in a brawl aged about 25	Son of Edward the Elder	
Eadred; 26 May 946 – 23 November 955 (9 years, 182 days)		c. 923 Son of Edward the Elder and Eadgifu of Kent	Unmarried	23 November 955; Frome; Aged about 32	Son of Edward the Elder	
Eadwig; 23 November 955 – 1 October 959 (3 years, 313 days)	Line engraving of Edwy made by an unknown engraver after an unknown artist	c. 940 Son of Edmund I and Ælfgifu of Shaftesbury	Ælfgifu; No verified children	1 October 959; Aged about 19	Son of Edmund I	
Edgar the Peaceful; 1 October 959 – 8 July 975 (15 years, 281 days)	King Edgar of England	c. 943; Wessex Son of Edmund I and Ælfgifu of Shaftesbury	(1) Æthelflæd c. 960; 1 son (2) Ælfthryth c. 964; 2 sons	8 July 975; Winchester; Aged 31	Son of Edmund I	
Edward the Martyr; 8 July 975 – 18 March 978 (2 years, 254 days)	St. Edward the Martyr	c. 962 Son of Edgar the Peaceful and Æthelflæd	Unmarried	18 March 978; Corfe Castle; Murdered aged about 16	Son of Edgar the Peaceful	
(1st reign) (Note: Æthelred was forced to go into exile in mid-1013, following Danish attacks, but was invited back following Sweyn Forkbeard's death in 1014.); Æthelred; Æthelred the Unready; 18 March 978 – 1013 (34–35 years)	Image of Æthelred II with an oversize sword from the illuminated manuscript "The Chronicle of Abingdon"	c. 968 Son of Edgar the Peaceful and Ælfthryth	(1) Ælfgifu of York; 991; 9 children (2) Emma of Normandy; 1002; 3 children	23 April 1016; London; Aged about 48	Son of Edgar the Peaceful	

=== House of Denmark ===
England came under the control of Sweyn Forkbeard, a Danish king, after an invasion in 1013, during which Æthelred abandoned the throne and went into exile in Normandy.

Name	Portrait	Birth	Marriage(s)	Death	Succession	Ref.
Sweyn; Sweyn Forkbeard; 25 December 1013 – 3 February 1014 (41 days)	Sweyn Forkbeard, from an architectural element in the Swansea Guildhall, Swansea, Wales	17 April 963; Denmark Son of Tove of the Obotrites and Harald Bluetooth	(1) Gunhild of Wenden c. 990; 7 children (2) Sigrid the Haughty c. 1000; 1 daughter	3 February 1014; Gainsborough; Aged 50	Right of conquest	

=== House of Wessex (restored, first time) ===
Following the death of Sweyn Forkbeard, Æthelred the Unready returned from exile and was again proclaimed king on 3 February 1014. His son succeeded him after being chosen king by the citizens of London and a part of the Witan, despite ongoing Danish efforts to wrest the crown from the West Saxons.

Name	Portrait	Birth	Marriage(s)	Death	Succession	Ref.
(2nd reign); Æthelred; Æthelred the Unready; 3 February 1014 – 23 April 1016 (2 years, 81 days)	Image of Æthelred II with an oversize sword from the illuminated manuscript "The Chronicle of Abingdon"	c. 968 Son of Edgar the Peaceful and Ælfthryth	(1) Ælfgifu of York; 991; 9 children (2) Emma of Normandy; 1002; 3 children	23 April 1016; London; Aged about 48	Son of Edgar the Peaceful	
Edmund Ironside; 23 April 1016 – 30 November 1016 (222 days)	Edmund Ironside	c. 990 Son of Æthelred and Ælfgifu of York	Edith of East Anglia; 2 children	30 November 1016; Glastonbury; Aged 26	Son of Æthelred	

=== House of Denmark (restored) ===
Following the decisive Battle of Assandun on 18 October 1016, King Edmund signed a treaty with Cnut (Canute) under which all of England except for Wessex would be controlled by Cnut. Upon Edmund's death just over a month later on 30 November, Cnut ruled the whole kingdom as its sole king for nineteen years.

Name	Portrait	Birth	Marriage(s)	Death	Succession	Ref.
Canute; Cnut the Great; 18 October 1016 – 12 November 1035 (19 years, 26 days)		c. 995 Son of Sweyn Forkbeard and Gunhilda of Poland	(1) Ælfgifu of Northampton; 2 sons (2) Emma of Normandy; 1017; 2 children	12 November 1035; Shaftesbury; Aged about 40	Son of Sweyn Treaty of Deerhurst	
Harold Harefoot; 12 November 1035 – 17 March 1040 (Note: Harold was only recognised as Regent until 1037, when was recognised as king.) (4 years, 127 days)		c. 1016 Son of Canute and Ælfgifu of Northampton	Ælfgifu? 1 son?	17 March 1040; Oxford; Aged about 24	Son of Canute	
Harthacnut; 17 March 1040 – 8 June 1042 (2 years, 84 days)		1018 Son of Canute and Emma of Normandy	Unmarried	8 June 1042; Lambeth; Aged about 24	Son of Canute	

=== House of Wessex (restored, second time) ===
After Harthacnut, there was a brief Saxon Restoration between 1042 and 1066.

Name	Portrait	Arms	Birth	Marriage(s)	Death	Succession	Ref.
Edward the Confessor; 8 June 1042 – 5 January 1066 (23 years, 212 days)			c. 1003; Islip Son of Æthelred and Emma of Normandy	Edith of Wessex; 23 January 1045; No children	5 January 1066; Westminster Palace; Aged about 63	Son of Æthelred	

=== House of Godwin ===
Name	Portrait	Arms	Birth	Marriage(s)	Death	Succession	Ref.
Harold Godwinson; 6 January 1066 – 14 October 1066 (282 days)			c. 1022 Son of Godwin of Wessex and Gytha Thorkelsdóttir	(1) Edith Swannesha; 5 children (2) Ealdgyth c. 1064; 2 sons	14 October 1066; Hastings; Died in battle aged about 44	Supposedly named heir by Edward the Confessor Elected by the Witenagemot	

=== House of Wessex (restored, third time) ===
After King Harold was killed at the Battle of Hastings, the Witan elected Edgar Ætheling as king. He ruled but was never crowned. He eventually abdicated his kingship and submitted to King William the Conqueror.

Name	Portrait	Birth	Marriage(s)	Death	Succession	Ref.
Edgar Ætheling; 15 October 1066 – 17 December 1066 (Note: After reigning for approximately 9 weeks, Edgar Atheling submitted to William the Conqueror, who had gained control of the area to the south and immediate west of London.) (64 days)		c. 1051 Son of Edward the Exile and Agatha	Unmarried	c. 1126; Aged about 75	Grandson of Edmund Ironside Elected by the Witenagemot	

=== House of Normandy ===
In 1066, several rival claimants to the English throne emerged. Among them were Harold Godwinson, recognised as king by the Witenagemot after the death of Edward the Confessor, as well as Harald Hardrada, King of Norway who claimed to be the rightful heir of Harthacnut, and Duke William II of Normandy, vassal to the King of France, and first cousin once-removed of Edward the Confessor. Harald and William both invaded separately in 1066. Godwinson successfully repelled the invasion by Hardrada, but ultimately lost the throne of England in the Norman conquest of England.

After the Battle of Hastings on 14 October 1066, William the Conqueror made permanent the recent removal of the capital from Winchester to London. Following the death of Harold Godwinson at Hastings, the Anglo-Saxon Witenagemot elected as king Edgar the Ætheling, the son of Edward the Exile and grandson of Edmund Ironside. The young monarch was unable to resist the invaders and was never crowned. William was crowned King William I of England on Christmas Day 1066, in Westminster Abbey, and is today known as William the Conqueror, William the Bastard or William I.

Name	Portrait	Arms	Birth	Marriage(s)	Death	Succession	Ref.
William I William the Conqueror; 25 December 1066 – 9 September 1087 (20 years, 259 days)	William the Conqueror depicted at the Battle of Hastings, on the Bayeux Tapestry		c. 1028; Falaise Castle Son of Robert the Magnificent and Herleva	Matilda of Flanders; Normandy; 1053; 9 children	9 September 1087; Rouen; Aged about 59 (Note: William I is buried at the Abbey of Saint-Étienne (French: Abbaye aux Hommes) in France.)	Supposedly named heir in 1052 by Edward the Confessor First cousin once removed of Edward the Confessor Right of conquest	
William II; William Rufus; 26 September 1087 (Note: William II was crowned on 26 September 1087.) – 2 August 1100 (12 years, 311 days)	William Rufus depicted in the Stowe Manuscript		c. 1056; Normandy Son of William the Conqueror and Matilda of Flanders	Unmarried	2 August 1100; New Forest; Shot with an arrow aged 44	Son of William I Granted the Kingdom of England over elder brother Robert Curthose	
Henry I Henry Beauclerc; 5 August 1100 (Note: Henry I was crowned on 5 August 1100.) – 1 December 1135 (35 years, 119 days)	Henry I		September 1068; Selby Son of William the Conqueror and Matilda of Flanders	(1) Matilda of Scotland; Westminster Abbey; 11 November 1100; 2 children (2) Adeliza of Louvain; Windsor Castle; 29 January 1121; No children	1 December 1135; Saint-Denis-en-Lyons; Aged 67 (Note: Henry I is buried at Reading Abbey.)	Son of William I Seizure of the Crown (from Robert Curthose)	

=== House of Blois ===
Henry I left no legitimate male heirs, his son William Adelin having died in the White Ship disaster. This ended the direct Norman line of kings in England. Henry named his eldest daughter, Matilda (Countess of Anjou by her second marriage to Geoffrey Plantagenet, Count of Anjou, as well as widow of her first husband, Henry V, Holy Roman Emperor), as his heir. Before naming Matilda as heir, he had been in negotiations to name his nephew Stephen of Blois as his heir. When Henry died, Stephen invaded England, and in a coup d'etat had himself crowned instead of Matilda. The period which followed is known as The Anarchy, as parties supporting each side fought in open warfare both in Britain and on the continent for the better part of two decades.

Name	Portrait	Arms	Birth	Marriage(s)	Death	Succession	Ref.
Stephen; Stephen of Blois; 22 December 1135 (Note: Stephen was crowned on 22 December 1135.) – 25 October 1154 (18 years, 308 days)	Stephen		c. 1096; Blois Son of Stephen II of Blois and Adela of Normandy	Matilda of Boulogne; Westminster; 1125; 6 children	25 October 1154; Dover Castle; Aged about 58	Grandson of William I Appointment / usurpation	

=== Disputed claimants ===
Matilda was declared heir presumptive by her father, Henry I, after the death of her brother on the White Ship, and acknowledged as such by the barons. Upon Henry I's death, the throne was seized by Matilda's cousin, Stephen of Blois. During the ensuing Anarchy, Matilda controlled England for a few months in 1141—the first woman to do so—but was never crowned and is rarely listed as a monarch of England. (Note: Matilda is not listed as a monarch of England in many genealogies within texts, including Carpenter, David (2003). A Struggle for Mastery. p. 533.; Warren, W.L. (1973). Henry II. Berkeley. p. 176. ISBN 9780520022829.; and Gillingham, John (1984). The Angevin Empire. p. x..)

Name	Portrait	Arms	Birth	Marriage(s)	Death	Succession	Ref.
(Title disputed); Matilda; Empress Matilda; 7 April 1141 – 1 November 1141 (209 days)	Matilda		7 February 1102; Sutton Courtenay Daughter of Henry I and Edith of Scotland	(1) Henry V of the Holy Roman Empire; Mainz Cathedral; 6 January 1114; No children (2) Geoffrey Plantagenet; Le Mans Cathedral; 22 May 1128; 3 sons	10 September 1167; Rouen; Aged 65	Daughter of Henry I Seizure of the Crown	

Count Eustace IV of Boulogne (c. 1130 – 17 August 1153) was appointed co-king of England by his father, King Stephen, on 6 April 1152, in order to guarantee his succession to the throne (as was the custom in France, but not in England). The Pope and the Church would not agree to this, and Eustace was not crowned. Eustace died the next year aged 23, during his father's lifetime, and so never became king in his own right.

=== House of Anjou ===
King Stephen came to an agreement with Matilda in November 1153 with the signing of the Treaty of Wallingford, where Stephen recognised Henry, son of Matilda and her second husband Geoffrey Plantagenet, Count of Anjou, as the designated heir. The royal house descended from Matilda and Geoffrey is widely known by two names, the House of Anjou (after Geoffrey's title as Count of Anjou) or the House of Plantagenet, after his sobriquet. Some historians prefer to group the subsequent kings into two groups, before and after the loss of the bulk of their French possessions, although they are not different royal houses.

The Angevins (from the French term meaning "from Anjou") ruled over the Angevin Empire during the 12th and 13th centuries, an area stretching from the Pyrenees to Ireland. They did not regard England as their primary home until most of their continental domains were lost by King John. The direct, eldest male line from Henry II includes monarchs commonly grouped together as the House of Plantagenet, which was the name given to the dynasty after the loss of most of their continental possessions, while cadet branches of this line became known as the House of Lancaster and the House of York during the War of the Roses.

The Angevins formulated England's royal coat of arms, which usually showed other kingdoms held or claimed by them or their successors, although without representation of Ireland for quite some time. Dieu et mon droit has generally been used as the motto of English monarchs since being adopted by Edward III, but it was first used as a battle cry by Richard I in 1198 at the Battle of Gisors, when he defeated the forces of Philip II of France, after which he made it his motto.

Name	Portrait	Arms	Birth	Marriage(s)	Death	Succession	Ref.
Henry II; Henry Curtmantle; 19 December 1154 (Note: Henry II was crowned on 19 December 1154 with his queen, Eleanor of Aquitaine.) – 6 July 1189 (34 years, 200 days)	Henry II		5 March 1133; Le Mans Son of Geoffrey V of Anjou and Matilda	Eleanor of Aquitaine; Bordeaux Cathedral; 18 May 1152; 8 children	6 July 1189; Chinon; Aged 56 (Note: Henry II is buried at Fontevraud Abbey.)	Grandson of Henry I Treaty of Wallingford	
Richard I Richard the Lionheart; 3 September 1189 (Note: Richard I was crowned on 3 September 1189.) – 6 April 1199 (9 years, 216 days)	Richard the Lionheart, an illustration from a 12th-century codex		8 September 1157; Beaumont Palace Son of Henry II and Eleanor of Aquitaine	Berengaria of Navarre; Limassol; 12 May 1191; No children	6 April 1199; Châlus; Shot by a quarrel aged 41 (Note: Richard II was buried at Rouen Cathedral. His body currently lies at Fontevraud Abbey.)	Son of Henry II Primogeniture	
John; John Lackland; 27 May 1199 (Note: John was crowned on 27 May 1199.) – 19 October 1216 (17 years, 146 days)	King John		24 December 1166; Beaumont Palace Son of Henry II and Eleanor of Aquitaine	(1) Isabel of Gloucester; Marlborough Castle; 29 August 1189; No children (2) Isabella of Angoulême; Bordeaux Cathedral; 24 August 1200; 5 children	19 October 1216; Newark-on-Trent; Aged 49 (Note: John is buried at Worcester Cathedral.)	Son of Henry II Proximity of blood	

Henry II named his son, another Henry (1155–1183), as co-ruler with him. But this was a Norman custom of designating an heir, and the younger Henry did not outlive his father and rule in his own right, so he is not counted as a monarch on lists of kings.

=== Disputed claimant ===
Louis VIII of France briefly won about half of England over to his side from 1216 to 1217 at the conclusion of the First Barons' War against King John. On marching into London he was openly received by the rebel barons and citizens of London and proclaimed (though not crowned) king at St Paul's cathedral. Many nobles, including Alexander II of Scotland, gathered to give homage to him. However, in signing the Treaty of Lambeth in 1217, Louis conceded that he had never been the legitimate king of England.

Name	Portrait	Arms	Birth	Marriage(s)	Death	Succession
(Title disputed); Louis; Louis VIII the Lion; 1216 – 22 September 1217 (1 year)			5 September 1187; Paris Son of Philip II of France and Isabella of Hainault	Blanche of Castile; Port-Mort; 23 May 1200; 13 children	8 November 1226; Montpensier; Aged 39	Right of conquest

=== House of Plantagenet ===
The House of Plantagenet takes its name from Geoffrey Plantagenet, Count of Anjou, husband of the Empress Matilda and father of Henry II. The name Plantagenet itself was unknown as a family name per se until Richard of York adopted it as his family name in the 15th century. It has since been retroactively applied to English monarchs from Henry II onward. It is common among modern historians to refer to Henry II and his sons as the "Angevins" due to their vast continental Empire, and most of the Angevin kings before John spent more time in their continental possessions than in England.

It is from the time of Henry III, after the loss of most of the family's continental possessions, that the Plantagenet kings became more English in nature. The Houses of Lancaster and York are cadet branches of the House of Plantagenet.

Name	Portrait	Arms	Birth	Marriage(s)	Death	Succession	Ref.
Henry III; Henry of Winchester; 28 October 1216 (Note: Henry III was crowned on 28 October 1216.) – 16 November 1272 (56 years, 20 days)	Henry III		1 October 1207; Winchester Castle Son of John and Isabella of Angoulême	Eleanor of Provence; Canterbury Cathedral; 14 January 1236; 5 children	16 November 1272; Westminster Palace; Aged 65	Son of John Primogeniture	
Edward I Edward Longshanks; 20 November 1272 (Note: Edward I was crowned on 19 August 1274 with Queen Eleanor.) – 7 July 1307 (34 years, 230 days)	Edward I of England		17 June 1239; Palace of Westminster Son of Henry III and Eleanor of Provence	(1) Eleanor of Castile; Abbey of Santa María la Real de Las Huelgas; 18 October 1254; 16 children (2) Margaret of France; Canterbury; 10 September 1299; 3 children	7 July 1307; Burgh by Sands; Aged 68	Son of Henry III Primogeniture	
Edward II; Edward of Caernarfon; 8 July 1307 (Note: Edward II was crowned on 25 February 1308 with Queen Isabella.) – 20 January 1327 (19 years, 197 days)			25 April 1284; Caernarfon Castle Son of Edward I and Eleanor of Castile	Isabella of France; Boulogne Cathedral; 24 January 1308; 4 children	21 September 1327; Berkeley Castle; Murdered aged 43 (Note: The date of Edward II's death is disputed by historian Ian Mortimer, who argues that he may not have been murdered, but held imprisoned in Europe for several more years.)	Son of Edward I Primogeniture	
Edward III; 25 January 1327 (Note: Edward III was crowned on 1 February 1327.) – 21 June 1377 (50 years, 148 days)		Until 1340, 1360–1369 1340–1360, from 1369	13 November 1312; Windsor Castle Son of Edward II and Isabella of France	Philippa of Hainault; York Minster; 25 January 1328; 14 children	21 June 1377; Sheen Palace; Aged 64	Son of Edward II Primogeniture	
Richard II; 22 June 1377 (Note: Richard II was crowned on 16 July 1377.) – 29 September 1399 (22 years, 100 days)			6 January 1367; Bordeaux Son of Edward the Black Prince and Joan of Kent	(1) Anne of Bohemia; 14 January 1382; No children (2) Isabella of Valois; Calais; 4 November 1396; No children	14 February 1400; Pontefract Castle; Aged 33	Grandson of Edward III Primogeniture	

=== House of Lancaster ===
This house descended from Edward III's third surviving son, John of Gaunt. Henry IV seized power from Richard II (and also displaced the next in line to the throne, Edmund Mortimer (then aged 7), a descendant of Edward III's second son, Lionel of Antwerp).

Name	Portrait	Arms	Birth	Marriage(s)	Death	Succession	Ref.
Henry IV; Henry of Bolingbroke; 30 September 1399 (Note: Henry IV was crowned on 13 October 1399.) – 20 March 1413 (13 years, 172 days)	Henry IV	until 1406 from 1406	15 April 1367; Bolingbroke Castle Son of John of Gaunt and Blanche of Lancaster	(1) Mary de Bohun; Arundel Castle; 27 July 1380; 6 children (2) Joanna of Navarre; Winchester Cathedral; 7 February 1403; No children	20 March 1413; Westminster Abbey; Aged 45	Grandson / heir male of Edward III Usurpation / agnatic primogeniture	
Henry V 21 March 1413 (Note: Henry V was crowned on 9 April 1413.) – 31 August 1422 (9 years, 164 days)	Henry V		16 September 1386; Monmouth Castle Son of Henry IV and Mary de Bohun	Catherine of Valois; Troyes Cathedral; 2 June 1420; 1 son	31 August 1422; Château de Vincennes; Aged 36	Son of Henry IV Agnatic primogeniture	
(1st reign); Henry VI; 1 September 1422 (Note: Henry VI was crowned on 6 November 1429.) – 4 March 1461 (38 years, 185 days)	Henry VI		6 December 1421; Windsor Castle Son of Henry V and Catherine of Valois	Margaret of Anjou; Titchfield Abbey; 22 April 1445; 1 son	21 May 1471; Tower of London; Allegedly murdered aged 49	Son of Henry V Agnatic primogeniture	

=== House of York ===
The House of York claimed the right to the throne through Edward III's second surviving son, Lionel of Antwerp, but it inherited its name from Edward's fourth surviving son, Edmund of Langley, 1st Duke of York.

The Wars of the Roses (1455–1485) saw the throne pass back and forth between the rival houses of Lancaster and York.

Name	Portrait	Arms	Birth	Marriage(s)	Death	Succession	Ref.
(1st reign); Edward IV; 4 March 1461 (Note: Edward IV was crowned on 28 June 1461.) – 3 October 1470 (9 years, 214 days)	Edward IV		28 April 1442; Rouen Son of Richard of York and Cecily Neville	Elizabeth Woodville; Grafton Regis; 1 May 1464; 10 children	9 April 1483; Westminster Palace; Aged 40	Great-great-grandson / heir general of Edward III Seizure of the Crown Cognatic primogeniture	

=== House of Lancaster (restored) ===
Name	Portrait	Arms	Birth	Marriage(s)	Death	Succession	Ref.
(2nd reign); Henry VI; 3 October 1470 – 11 April 1471 (191 days)	Henry VI		6 December 1421; Windsor Castle Son of Henry V and Catherine of Valois	Margaret of Anjou; Titchfield Abbey; 22 April 1445; 1 son	21 May 1471; Tower of London; Allegedly murdered aged 49	Son of Henry V Seizure of the Crown	

=== House of York (restored) ===
Name	Portrait	Arms	Birth	Marriage(s)	Death	Succession	Ref.
(2nd reign); Edward IV; 11 April 1471 – 9 April 1483 (11 years, 364 days)	Edward IV		28 April 1442; Rouen Son of Richard of York and Cecily Neville	Elizabeth Woodville; Grafton Regis; 1 May 1464; 10 children	9 April 1483; Westminster Palace; Aged 40	Great-great-grandson / heir general of Edward III Seizure of the Crown Cognatic primogeniture	
Edward V 9 April 1483 – 25 June 1483 (Note: Edward V was deposed by Richard III, who usurped the throne on the grounds that Edward was illegitimate. He was never crowned.) (78 days)	Edward V		2 November 1470; Westminster Son of Edward IV and Elizabeth Woodville	Unmarried	Disappeared mid-1483 London; Allegedly murdered aged 12	Son of Edward IV Cognatic primogeniture	
Richard III; 26 June 1483 (Note: Richard III was crowned on 6 July 1483 with Queen Anne.) – 22 August 1485 (2 years, 58 days)	Richard III		2 October 1452; Fotheringhay Castle Son of Richard of York and Cecily Neville	Anne Neville; Westminster Abbey; 12 July 1472; 1 son	22 August 1485; Bosworth Field; Killed in battle aged 32 (Note: The body of Richard III was exhumed and reburied in Leicester Cathedral in 2015.)	Great-great-grandson of Edward III Titulus Regius	

=== House of Tudor ===
The Tudors descended in the female line from John Beaufort, one of the illegitimate children of John of Gaunt (third surviving son of Edward III), by Gaunt's long-term mistress Katherine Swynford. Those descended from English monarchs only through an illegitimate child would normally have no claim on the throne, but the situation was complicated when Gaunt and Swynford eventually married in 1396 (25 years after John Beaufort's birth). In view of the marriage, the church retroactively declared the Beauforts legitimate via a papal bull the same year. Parliament did the same in an Act in 1397. A subsequent proclamation by John of Gaunt's legitimate son, King Henry IV, also recognised the Beauforts' legitimacy, but declared them ineligible ever to inherit the throne. Nevertheless, the Beauforts remained closely allied with Gaunt's other descendants, the Royal House of Lancaster.

John Beaufort's granddaughter Lady Margaret Beaufort was married to Edmund Tudor. Tudor was the son of Welsh courtier Owain Tudur (anglicised to Owen Tudor) and Catherine of Valois, the widow of the Lancastrian King Henry V. Edmund Tudor and his siblings were either illegitimate, or the product of a secret marriage, and owed their fortunes to the goodwill of their legitimate half-brother King Henry VI. When the House of Lancaster fell from power, the Tudors followed.

By the late 15th century, the Tudors were the last hope for the Lancaster supporters. Edmund Tudor's son became king as Henry VII after defeating Richard III at the Battle of Bosworth Field in 1485, winning the Wars of the Roses. King Henry married Elizabeth of York, daughter of Edward IV, thereby uniting the Lancastrian and York lineages. (See family tree.)

With Henry VIII's break from the Roman Catholic Church, the monarch became the Supreme Head of the Church of England and of the Church of Ireland. Elizabeth I's title became the Supreme Governor of the Church of England.

Name	Portrait	Arms	Birth	Marriage(s)	Death	Succession	Ref.
Henry VII; 22 August 1485 (Note: Henry VII was crowned on 30 October 1485.) – 21 April 1509 (23 years, 243 days)	Henry VII, by Michel Sittow, 1505		28 January 1457; Pembroke Castle Son of Edmund Tudor and Margaret Beaufort	Elizabeth of York; Westminster Abbey; 18 January 1486; 8 children	21 April 1509; Richmond Palace; Aged 52	Great-great-great-grandson of Edward III Right of conquest	
Henry VIII; 22 April 1509 (Note: Henry VIII was crowned on 24 June 1509 with Queen Catherine.) – 28 January 1547 (37 years, 282 days)	Henry VIII, by Hans Holbein, c.1536		28 June 1491; Greenwich Palace Son of Henry VII and Elizabeth of York	(1) Catherine of Aragon; Greenwich; 11 June 1509; 1 daughter (2) Anne Boleyn; Westminster Palace; 25 January 1533 (Note: Edward Hall and Raphael Holinshed both record an earlier secret wedding between Henry and Anne, which was conducted in Dover on 15 November 1532.); 1 daughter (3) Jane Seymour; Whitehall Palace; 30 May 1536; 1 son 3 further marriages No more children	28 January 1547; Whitehall Palace; Aged 55	Son of Henry VII Primogeniture	
Edward VI; 28 January 1547 (Note: Edward VI was crowned on 20 February 1547.) – 6 July 1553 (6 years, 160 days)	Edward VI, by Hans Eworth		12 October 1537; Hampton Court Palace Son of Henry VIII and Jane Seymour	Unmarried	6 July 1553; Greenwich Palace; Aged 15	Son of Henry VIII Primogeniture	

=== Disputed claimant ===
Edward VI named Lady Jane Grey as his heir in his will, overruling the order of succession laid down by Parliament in the Third Succession Act. Four days after his death on 6 July 1553, Jane was proclaimed queen—the first of three Tudor women to be proclaimed queen regnant. Nine days after the proclamation, on 19 July, the Privy Council switched allegiance and proclaimed Edward VI's Catholic half-sister Mary queen. Jane was executed for treason in 1554, aged 16.

Name	Portrait	Arms	Birth	Marriage(s)	Death	Succession	Ref.
(Title disputed); Jane; 10 July 1553 – 19 July 1553 (Overthrown after 9 days)			October 1537; Bradgate Park Daughter of the 1st Duke of Suffolk and Frances Brandon	Guildford Dudley; The Strand; 21 May 1553; No children	12 February 1554; Tower of London; Executed aged 16	Great-granddaughter of Henry VII Devise for the Succession	

Name	Portrait	Arms	Birth	Marriage(s)	Death	Succession	Ref.
Mary I Bloody Mary; 19 July 1553 (Note: Mary I was crowned on 1 October 1553.) – 17 November 1558 (5 years, 122 days)	Mary I, by Antonius Mor, 1554		18 February 1516; Greenwich Palace Daughter of Henry VIII and Catherine of Aragon	Philip II of Spain; Winchester Cathedral; 25 July 1554; No children	17 November 1558; St James's Palace; Aged 42	Daughter of Henry VIII Third Succession Act	
(Jure uxoris); Philip; 25 July 1554 (Note: Philip was not meant to be a mere consort; rather, the status of Mary I's husband was envisioned as that of a co-monarch during her reign. However the extent of his authority and his status are ambiguous. The act says that Philip shall have the title of king and "shall aid her Highness ... in the happy administration of her Grace's realms and dominions", but elsewhere says that Mary shall be the sole Queen.) – 17 November 1558 (4 years, 116 days)	King Philip of England		21 May 1527; Valladolid Son of Charles V of the Holy Roman Empire and Isabella of Portugal	Mary I of England; Winchester Cathedral; 25 July 1554; No children 3 other marriages 7 children	13 September 1598; El Escorial; Aged 71	Husband of Mary I Act for the Marriage of Queen Mary to Philip of Spain	—N/a

Under the terms of the marriage treaty between Philip I of Naples (Philip II of Spain from 15 January 1556) and Queen Mary I, Philip was to enjoy Mary's titles and honours for as long as their marriage should last. All official documents, including acts of Parliament, were to be dated with both their names, and Parliament was to be called under the joint authority of the couple. Queen Mary's Marriage Act 1554 (1 Mar. Sess. 3. c. 2) gave him the title of king and stated that he "shall aid her Highness ... in the happy administration of her Grace's realms and dominions" (although elsewhere the act stated that Mary was to be "sole queen"). Nonetheless, Philip was to co-reign with his wife.

As the new King of England could not read English, it was ordered that a note of all matters of state should be made in Latin or Spanish. Coins were minted showing the heads of both Mary and Philip, and the coat of arms of England (pictured right) was impaled with Philip's to denote their joint reign. Acts which made it high treason to deny Philip's royal authority were passed in England (the Treason Act 1554) and Ireland (the Treason Act 1556). In 1555, Pope Paul IV issued a papal bull recognising Philip and Mary as rightful King and Queen of Ireland.

Name	Portrait	Arms	Birth	Marriage(s)	Death	Succession	Ref.
Elizabeth I 17 November 1558 (Note: Elizabeth I was crowned on 15 January 1559.) – 24 March 1603 (44 years, 128 days)	Elizabeth I, by Darnley		7 September 1533; Greenwich Palace Daughter of Henry VIII and Anne Boleyn	Unmarried	24 March 1603; Richmond Palace; Aged 69	Daughter of Henry VIII Third Succession Act	

=== House of Stuart ===
Following the death of Elizabeth I in 1603 without issue, her first cousin twice removed, King James VI of Scotland, succeeded to the English throne as James I in the Union of the Crowns. James was descended from the Tudors through his great-grandmother, Margaret Tudor, the eldest daughter of Henry VII and wife of James IV of Scotland. In 1604, he adopted the title King of Great Britain. However, the two parliaments remained separate until the Acts of Union 1707.

Name	Portrait	Arms	Birth	Marriage(s)	Death	Succession	Ref.
James I 24 March 1603 (Note: James I was crowned on 25 July 1603 with Queen Anne.) – 27 March 1625 (22 years, 4 days)	James I, by Paulus van Somer		19 June 1566; Edinburgh Castle Son of Mary, Queen of Scots and Henry Stuart, Lord Darnley	Anne of Denmark; Oslo; 23 November 1589; 7 children	27 March 1625; Theobalds House; Aged 58	Great-great-grandson / heir general of Henry VII	
Charles I 27 March 1625 (Note: Charles I was crowned on 2 February 1626.) – 30 January 1649 (23 years, 310 days)	Charles I, by Anthony van Dyck		19 November 1600; Dunfermline Palace Son of James I and Anne of Denmark	Henrietta Maria of France; St Augustine's Abbey; 13 June 1625; 9 children	30 January 1649; Whitehall Palace; Executed aged 48	Son of James I Cognatic primogeniture	

=== Interregnum ===
No monarch reigned between the execution of Charles I in 1649 and the Restoration of Charles II in 1660. Between 1649 and 1653, there was no single English head of state, as England was ruled directly by the Rump Parliament with the English Council of State acting as executive power during a period known as the Commonwealth of England. After a coup d'etat in 1653, Oliver Cromwell forcibly took control of England from Parliament. He dissolved the Rump Parliament at the head of a military force and England entered a period known as The Protectorate, under Cromwell's direct control with the title Lord Protector.

It was within the power of the Lord Protector to choose his heir and Oliver Cromwell chose his eldest son, Richard Cromwell, to succeed him. Richard lacked both the ability to rule and confidence of the Army, and he was forcibly removed by the English Committee of Safety under the leadership of Charles Fleetwood in May 1659. England again lacked any single head of state during several months of conflict between Fleetwood's party and that of George Monck. Monck took control of the country in December 1659, and after almost a year of anarchy, the monarchy was formally restored when Charles II returned from France to accept the throne of England. This was following the Declaration of Breda and an invitation to reclaim the throne from the Convention Parliament of 1660.

Lords Protector
Name	Portrait	Arms	Birth	Marriage(s)	Death
Oliver Cromwell; 16 December 1653 – 3 September 1658 (4 years, 262 days)	Oliver Cromwell		25 April 1599; Huntingdon Son of Robert Cromwell and Elizabeth Steward	Elizabeth Bourchier; St Giles; 22 August 1620; 9 children	3 September 1658; Whitehall; Aged 59
Richard Cromwell; Tumbledown Dick; 3 September 1658 – 7 May 1659 (247 days)	Richard Cromwell, c.1650		4 October 1626; Huntingdon Son of Oliver Cromwell and Elizabeth Bourchier	Dorothy Maijor; May 1649; 9 children	12 July 1712; Cheshunt; Aged 85

=== House of Stuart (restored) ===
After the Monarchy was restored, England came under the rule of Charles II, whose reign was relatively peaceful domestically, given the tumultuous time of the Interregnum years. Tensions still existed between Catholics and Protestants. With the ascension of Charles's brother, the openly Catholic James II, England was again sent into a period of political turmoil.

James II was ousted by Parliament less than three years after ascending to the throne, replaced by his daughter Mary II and her husband (also his nephew) William III during the Glorious Revolution. While James and his descendants would continue to claim the throne, all Catholics (such as James and his son Charles) were barred from the throne by the Act of Settlement 1701, enacted by Anne, another of James's Protestant daughters. After the Acts of Union 1707, England as a sovereign state ceased to exist, replaced by the new Kingdom of Great Britain.

Name	Portrait	Arms	Birth	Marriage(s)	Death	Succession	Ref.
(Recognised by Royalists in 1649); Charles II; 29 May 1660 (Note: Charles II was crowned on 23 April 1661.) – 6 February 1685 (24 years, 254 days)			29 May 1630; St James's Palace Son of Charles I and Henrietta Maria of France	Catherine of Braganza; Portsmouth; 21 May 1662; No children	6 February 1685; Whitehall Palace; Aged 54	Son of Charles I Cognatic primogeniture English Restoration	
James II; 6 February 1685 (Note: James II was crowned on 23 April 1685 with Mary of Modena.) – 23 December 1688 (Overthrown after 3 years, 321 days)			14 October 1633; St James's Palace Son of Charles I and Henrietta Maria of France	(1) Anne Hyde; The Strand; 3 September 1660; 8 children (2) Mary of Modena; Dover; 21 November 1673; 7 children	16 September 1701; Château de Saint-Germain-en-Laye; Aged 67	Son of Charles I Cognatic primogeniture	
Mary II; 13 February 1689 (Note: Mary II and William III were crowned on 11 April 1689.) – 28 December 1694 (5 years, 319 days)			30 April 1662; St James's Palace Daughter of James II and Anne Hyde	William III of England; St James's Palace; 4 November 1677; No children	28 December 1694; Kensington Palace; Aged 32	Daughter of James II Offered the Crown by Parliament	
William III; William of Orange; 13 February 1689 – 8 March 1702 (13 years, 24 days)			4 November 1650; The Hague Son of William II of Orange and Mary of England	Mary II; St James's Palace; 4 November 1677; No children	8 March 1702; Kensington Palace; Aged 51	Grandson of Charles I Offered the Crown by Parliament	
Anne; 8 March 1702 (Note: Anne was crowned on 23 April 1702.) – 1 May 1707 (5 years, 55 days) (Queen of Great Britain until 1 August 1714) (12 years, 147 days)			6 February 1665; St James's Palace Daughter of James II and Anne Hyde	George of Denmark; St James's Palace; 28 July 1683; No surviving children	1 August 1714; Kensington Palace; Aged 49	Daughter of James II Cognatic primogeniture Bill of Rights 1689	
→							

== Wales ==
King of Wales was a very rarely used title, because Wales, much like Ireland, never achieved a degree of political unity, like that of England or Scotland during the Middle Ages. While many different leaders in Wales claimed the title of 'King of Wales', the country was only truly united once and that occurred under the rule of Gruffydd ap Llywelyn from 1055 to 1063.

== Scotland ==
=== House of Alpin (848–1034) ===
The reign of Kenneth MacAlpin begins what is often called the House of Alpin, an entirely modern concept. The descendants of Kenneth MacAlpin were divided into two branches; the crown would alternate between the two, the death of a king from one branch often hastened by war or assassination by a pretender from the other. Malcolm II was the last king of the House of Alpin; in his reign, he successfully crushed all opposition to him and, having no sons, was able to pass the crown to his daughter's son, Duncan I, who inaugurated the House of Dunkeld.

Portrait	Traditional modern English regnal name (with modern Gaelic equivalent)	Medieval Gaelic name	Succession	Reign	Title	Epithet
	Kenneth I MacAlpin (Coinneach mac Ailpein)	Cináed mac Ailpín; Ciniod m. Ailpin	son of Alpin king of Dál Riata	843/848 – 13 February 858	Rex Pictorum ("King of the Picts")	An Ferbasach, "The Conqueror"
	Donald I (Dòmhnall mac Ailpein)	Domnall mac Ailpín	son of Alpin king of Dál Riata, and brother of Kenneth I	858 – 13 April 862	Rex Pictorum ("King of the Picts")	
	Constantine I (Còiseam mac Choinnich)	Causantín mac Cináeda	Son of Kenneth I	862–877	Rex Pictorum ("King of the Picts")	An Finn-Shoichleach, "The Wine-Bountiful"
	Áed (Aodh mac Choinnich)	Áed mac Cináeda	Son of Kenneth I	877–878	Rex Pictorum ("King of the Picts")	
	Giric (Griogair mac Dhunghail)	Giric mac Dúngail	Son of Donald I?	878–889	Rex Pictorum ("King of the Picts")	Mac Rath, "Son of Fortune"
	Eochaid	Eochaid mac Run	grandson of Kenneth I*	878–889?*	Rex Pictorum ("King of the Picts")	
	Donald II (Dòmhnall mac Chòiseim)	Domnall mac Causantín	Son of Constantine I	889–900	Rí Alban ("King of Scotland"); Rì nan Albannaich ("King of Scots")	Dásachtach, "the Madman"
	Constantine II (Còiseam mac Aoidh)	Causantín mac Áeda	Son of Áed	900–943	Rí Alban ("King of Scotland"); Rì nan Albannaich ("King of Scots")	An Midhaise, "the Middle Aged"
	Malcolm I (Maol Chaluim mac Dhòmhnaill)	Máel Coluim mac Domnall	Son of Donald II	943–954	Rí Alban ("King of Scotland"); Rì nan Albannaich ("King of Scots")	An Bodhbhdercc, "the Dangerous Red"
	Indulf	Ildulb mac Causantín	Son of Constantine II	954–962	Rí Alban ("King of Scotland"); Rì nan Albannaich ("King of Scots")	An Ionsaighthigh, "the Aggressor"
	Dub (Dubh or Duff) (Dubh mac Mhaoil Chaluim)	Dub mac Maíl Choluim	Son of Malcolm I	962–967	Rí Alban ("King of Scotland"); Rì nan Albannaich ("King of Scots")	Dén, "the Vehement"
	Cuilén (Cailean)	Cuilén mac Ilduilb	Son of Indulf	967–971	Rí Alban ("King of Scotland"); Rì nan Albannaich ("King of Scots")	An Fionn, "the White"
	Amlaíb (Amhlaigh)	Amlaíb mac Ilduilb	Son of Indulf	973–977‡	Rí Alban ("King of Scotland"); Rì nan Albannaich ("King of Scots")	
	Kenneth II (Coinneach mac Mhaoil Chaluim)	Cináed mac Maíl Choluim	Son of Malcolm I	971–995	Rí Alban ("King of Scotland"); Rì nan Albannaich ("King of Scots")	An Fionnghalach, "the Fratricide"
	Constantine III (Còiseam mac Chailein)	Causantín mac Cuiléin	Son of Cuilén	995–997	Rí Alban ("King of Scotland"); Rì nan Albannaich ("King of Scots")	
	Kenneth III (Coinneach mac Dhuibh)	Cináed mac Duib	Son of Dub	997 – 25 March 1005	Rí Alban ("King of Scotland"); Rì nan Albannaich ("King of Scots")	An Donn, "the Chief"/ "the Brown"
	Malcolm II (Maol Chaluim mac Choinnich)	Máel Coluim mac Cináeda	Son of Kenneth II	1005–1034	Rí Alban ("King of Scotland"); Rì nan Albannaich ("King of Scots")	Forranach, "the Destroyer"

*Eochaid was a son of Run, King of Strathclyde, but his mother was a daughter of Kenneth I. Evidence of his reign is unclear. He may have never actually been king and if he was, he was co-king with Giric.

‡Amlaíb is known only by a reference to his death in 977, which reports him as King of Alba; since Kenneth II is known to have still been King in 972–973, Amlaíb must have taken power between 973 and 977.

=== House of Dunkeld (1034–1286) ===
Duncan succeeded to the throne as the maternal grandson of Malcolm II. He was also the heir-general of Malcolm I, as his paternal grandfather, Duncan of Atholl was the third son of Malcolm I. The House of Dunkeld was therefore closely related to the House of Alpin. Duncan was killed in battle by Macbeth, who had a long and relatively successful reign. In a series of battles between 1057 and 1058, Duncan's son Malcolm III defeated and killed Macbeth and Macbeth's stepson and heir Lulach, claiming the throne. The dynastic feuds did not end there: on Malcolm III's death in battle, his brother Donald III, known as "Bán", claimed the throne, expelling Malcolm III's sons from Scotland. A civil war in the family ensued, with Donald III and Malcolm III's son Edmund opposed by Malcolm III's English-backed sons, led first by Duncan II and then by Edgar. Edgar triumphed, sending his uncle and brother to monasteries. After the reign of David I, the Scottish throne was passed according to rules of primogeniture, moving from father to son, or where not possible, brother to brother.

Modern English & Regnal Name (Modern Gaelic Name) (Medieval Gaelic Name) Reign	Portrait	Medieval Title	Epithet Nickname	Marriages	Succession (Father's Family)
Duncan I (Donnchadh mac Crìonain) (Donnchad mac Crínáin); 1034–1040		Rí Alban	An t-Ilgarach "the Diseased" or "the Sick"	Suthen at least two sons	Grandson of Malcolm II
Macbeth (MacBheatha mac Fhionnlaigh) (Mac Bethad mac Findláich); 1040–1057		Rí Alban	Rí Deircc "the Red King"	Gruoch of Scotland no children	Son of Mormaer Findláech
Lulach (Lughlagh mac Gille Chomghain) (Lulach mac Gille Comgaín); 1057–1058		Rí Alban	Tairbith "the Unfortunate" - Fatuus "the Foolish"	Unknown two children	Son of Gille Coemgáin, Mormaer of Moray and Gruoch of Scotland; Step-son of Macbeth
Malcolm III (Maol Chaluim mac Dhonnchaidh) (Máel Coluim mac Donnchada); 1058–1093		Rí Alban / Scottorum basileus	? Cenn Mór ("Canmore") "Great Chief"	Ingibiorg Finnsdottir three sons Margaret of Wessex; 1070 eight children	Son of Duncan I
Donald III (Dòmhnall mac Dhonnchaidh) (Domnall mac Donnchada); 1093–1097		Rí Alban	Bán, "the Fair"	Unknown at least one daughter	Son of Duncan I
Duncan II (Donnchadh mac Mhaoil Chaluim) (Donnchad mac Maíl Choluim); 1094		Rí Alban / Rex Scottorum		Uchtreda of Northumbria one son	Son of Malcolm III
Edgar (Eagar mac Mhaoil Chaluim) (Étgar mac Maíl Choluim); 1097–1107		Rí Alban / Rex Scottorum	Probus, "the Valiant"	None	Son of Malcolm III
Alexander I (Alasdair mac Mhaoil Chaluim) (Alaxandair mac Maíl Choluim); 1107–1124		Rí Alban / Rex Scottorum	"the Fierce"	Sybilla of Normandy no children	Son of Malcolm III
David I (Dàibhidh mac Mhaoil Chaluim) (Dabíd mac Maíl Choluim); 1124–1153		Rí Alban / Rex Scottorum	"the Saint"	Maud, Countess of Huntingdon; 1113 four children	Son of Malcolm III
Malcolm IV (Maol Chaluim mac Eanraig) (Máel Coluim mac Eanric); 1153–1165		Rí Alban / Rex Scottorum	Virgo "the Maiden" - Cenn Mór, "Great Chief"	None	Grandson of David I
William I (Uilleam mac Eanraig) (Uilliam mac Eanric); 1165–1214		Rí Alban / Rex Scottorum	"the Lion" - Garbh, "the Rough"	Ermengarde de Beaumont; Woodstock Palace, Oxford, England; 5 September 1186 four children	Grandson of David I
Alexander II (Alasdair mac Uilleim) (Alaxandair mac Uilliam); 1214–1249		Rí Alban / Rex Scottorum		Joan of England; York Minster, England; 21 June 1221 no children Marie de Coucy; Roxburgh; 15 May 1239 one son	Son of William I
Alexander III (Alasdair mac Alasdair) (Alaxandair mac Alaxandair); 1249–1286		Rí Alban / Rex Scottorum		Margaret of England; York Minster, England; 25 December 1251 three children Yolande de Dreux; Jedburgh Abbey; 15 October 1285 no children	Son of Alexander II

=== House of Sverre (1286–1290) ===
The status of Margaret, Maid of Norway, as a Scottish monarch is debated by historians. One of her biographers, Archie Duncan, argues that because she was "never inaugurated, she was never queen of Scots". Another, Norman H. Reid, insists that Margaret was "accepted as queen" by her contemporaries but that, owing to the lack of Inauguration, "[her] reign never started".

Name	Portrait	Birth	Marriage(s)	Death	Succession
Margaret the Maid of Norway; 1286–1290		c. April 1283; Tønsberg, Norway Daughter of Eric II of Norway and Margaret of Scotland	None	September/October 1290; St Margaret's Hope, Orkney aged 7	Granddaughter of Alexander III

=== Monarchy of Scotland restored ===
==== House of Balliol (1292–1296) ====
The death of Margaret of Norway began a two-year interregnum in Scotland caused by a succession crisis. With her death, the descent of William I became extinct and there was no obvious heir. Thirteen candidates presented themselves; the most prominent were John Balliol, great-grandson of William I's younger brother David of Huntingdon, and Robert de Brus, 5th Lord of Annandale, David of Huntingdon's grandson. The Scottish magnates invited Edward I of England to arbitrate the claims. He did so but forced the Scots to swear allegiance to him as overlord. Eventually, it was decided that John Balliol should become king. He proved weak and incapable and, in 1296, was forced to abdicate by Edward I who then attempted to annex Scotland into the Kingdom of England.

Name	Portrait	Birth	Marriage(s)	Death	Succession
John Balliol; Toom Tabard ("Empty Cloak") (Iain Balliol); 1292–1296		c. 1249	Isabella de Warenne; 9 February 1281 at least one son	c. 25 November 1314; Picardy, France	Great-grandson of David of Huntingdon (brother of William I)

=== Monarchy of Scotland restored (second time) ===
==== House of Bruce (1306–1371) ====
For ten years, Scotland had no king. The Scots, however, refused to tolerate English rule. First William Wallace then John Comyn and finally Robert the Bruce (the grandson of the 1292 competitor, Robert de Brus, 5th Lord of Annandale) fought against the English. Bruce and his supporters had murdered their rival to the throne of Scotland, John Comyn, on 10 February 1306 at Greyfriars Church in Dumfries. Shortly after in 1306, Robert was crowned King of Scots at Scone. Robert Bruce was then hunted down for his crime of murder, and subsequently he escaped to the outskirt islands. Leaving the country completely leaderless and the English invaded once again. Bruce would return a year later and gain support for his cause. His energy, and the corresponding replacement of the vigorous Edward I with his weaker son Edward II in 1307, allowed Scotland to free itself from English rule. At the Battle of Bannockburn in 1314, the Scots routed the English, and by 1328 the English had agreed by treaty to accept Scottish independence. Robert's son, David, acceded to the throne as a child. The English renewed their war with Scotland, and David was forced to flee the kingdom by Edward Balliol, son of King John, who managed to get himself crowned (1332–1356) and to give away Scotland's southern counties to England before being driven out again. David spent much of his life in exile, first in freedom with his ally, France, and then in prison in England. He was only able to return to Scotland in 1357. Upon his death, childless, in 1371, the House of Bruce came to an end.

Name	Portrait	Arms	Birth	Marriage(s)	Death	Succession
Robert I the Bruce (Raibeart a Briuis); 1306–1329			11 July 1274; Turnberry Castle, Ayrshire Son of Robert de Brus, 6th Lord of Annandale and Marjorie, Countess of Carrick	Isabella of Mar; 1295 one daughter Elizabeth de Burgh; Writtle, Essex, England; 1302 four children	7 June 1329; Manor of Cardross, Dunbartonshire aged 54	Great-great-grandson of David of Huntingdon (brother of William I) (election)
David II (Dàibhidh Bruis); 1329–1371			5 March 1324; Dunfermline Palace, Fife Son of Robert I and Elizabeth de Burgh	Joan of England; Berwick-upon-Tweed; 17 July 1328 no children Margaret Drummond; Inchmurdach, Fife; 20 February 1364 no children	22 February 1371; Edinburgh Castle aged 46	Son of Robert I (primogeniture)

Disputed claimant

==== House of Balliol (1332–1356) ====
Edward Balliol was the son of King John Balliol, who had himself ruled for four years following his election in the Great Cause. Following his abdication, John Balliol lived out his life in obscurity in Picardy, France. During the minority of David II, Edward Balliol seized the opportunity to assert his claim to the throne, and backed by the English, he defeated the forces of David's regency and was himself crowned king at Scone in 1332. He was quickly defeated by loyalist forces, and sent back to England. With English support, he would mount two more attempts to seize the throne again, in 1333 and 1335, each time his actual control of the throne was brief before being sent back to England, for the last time in 1336. When David returned from exile in 1341 to rule in his own right, Edward lost most of his support. When David II was captured in battle in 1346, Edward made one last attempt to seize the throne for himself, but had little support and the campaign fizzled before it gained much traction. In 1356 he renounced all claims to the throne.

Name	Portrait	Birth	Marriage(s)	Death	Succession
Edward Balliol; 1332–1356; In opposition to David II		1283 Son of John Balliol and Isabella de Warenne	None	1367; Doncaster, Yorkshire, England aged 83–84	Son of John Balliol, candidate of the English to replace the exiled David II

==== House of Stewart/Stuart (1371–1651) ====
Robert the Stewart was a grandson of Robert I by the latter's daughter, Marjorie. Having been born in 1316, he was older than his uncle, David II. Consequently, he was at his accession a middle aged man, already 55, and unable to reign vigorously, a problem also faced by his son Robert III, who also ascended in middle age at 53 in 1390, and suffered lasting damage in a horse-riding accident. These two were followed by a series of regencies, caused by the youth of the succeeding five boy kings. Consequently, the Stewart era saw periods of royal inertia, during which the nobles usurped power from the crown, followed by periods of personal rule by the monarch, during which he or she would attempt to address the issues created by their own minority and the long-term effects of previous reigns. Governing Scotland became increasingly difficult, as the powerful nobility became increasingly intractable. James I's attempts to curb the disorder of the realm ended in his assassination. James III was killed in a civil war between himself and the nobility, led by his own son. When James IV, who had governed sternly and suppressed the aristocrats, died in the Battle of Flodden, his wife Margaret Tudor, who had been nominated regent for their young son James V, was unseated by noble feuding, and James V's own wife, Mary of Guise, succeeded in ruling Scotland during the regency for her young daughter Mary I only by dividing and conquering the noble factions, distributing French bribes with a liberal hand. Finally, Mary I, the daughter of James V, found herself unable to govern Scotland faced with the surliness of the aristocracy and the intransigence of the population, who favoured Calvinism and disapproved of her Catholicism. She was forced to abdicate, and fled to England, where she was imprisoned in various castles and manor houses for eighteen years and finally executed for treason against the English queen Elizabeth I. Upon her abdication, her son, fathered by Henry Stuart, Lord Darnley, a junior member of the Stewart family, became King as James VI.

James VI became King of England and Ireland as James I in 1603, when his cousin Elizabeth I died. Thereafter, although the two crowns of England and Scotland remained separate, the monarchy was based chiefly in England. Charles I, James's son, found himself faced with Civil War. The resultant conflict lasted eight years, and ended in his execution. The English Parliament then decreed their monarchy to be at an end. The Scots Parliament, after some deliberation, broke their links with England, and declared that Charles II, son and heir of Charles I, would become King. He ruled until 1651 when the armies of Oliver Cromwell occupied Scotland and drove him into exile.

Name	Portrait	Arms	Birth	Marriage(s)	Death	Succession
Robert II the Stewart (Raibeart II Stiùbhairt); 1371–1390			2 March 1316; Paisley, Renfrewshire Son of Walter Stewart, 6th High Steward of Scotland and Marjorie Bruce	(1) Elizabeth Mure; 1336 (uncertain canonicity); 1349 (with Papal dispensation) ten children (2) Euphemia de Ross; 2 May 1355 four children	19 April 1390; Dundonald Castle, Ayrshire aged 74	Grandson of Robert I (primogeniture)
Robert III (born John Stewart) the Lame King (Raibeart III Stiùbhairt, An Righ Bhacaigh); 1390–1406			c. 1337; Scone Palace, Perth Son of Robert II and Elizabeth Mure	Anabella Drummond; 1367 seven children	4 April 1406; Rothesay Castle aged about 69	Son of Robert II (primogeniture)
James I (Seumas I Stiùbhairt); 1406–1437			late July 1394; Dunfermline Palace, Fife Son of Robert III and Anabella Drummond	Joan Beaufort; Southwark Cathedral; 2 February 1424 eight children	21 February 1437; Blackfriars, Perth aged about 42	Son of Robert III (primogeniture)
James II; Fiery Face (Seumas II Stiùbhairt); 1437–1460			16 October 1430; Holyrood Abbey, Edinburgh Son of James I and Joan Beaufort	Mary of Guelders; Holyrood Abbey; 3 July 1449 seven children	3 August 1460; Roxburgh Castle aged 29	Son of James I (primogeniture)
James III (Seumas III Stiùbhairt); 1460–1488			10 July 1451; Stirling Castle or St Andrews Castle Son of James II and Mary of Guelders	Margaret of Denmark; Holyrood Abbey; 13 July 1469 three children	11 June 1488; Sauchie Burn aged 36	Son of James II (primogeniture)
James IV (Seumas IV Stiùbhairt); 1488–1513			17 March 1473; Stirling Castle Son of James III and Margaret of Denmark	Margaret Tudor; Holyrood Abbey; 8 August 1503 six children	9 September 1513; Flodden Field, Northumberland, England aged 40	Son of James III (primogeniture)
James V (Seumas V Stiùbhairt); 1513–1542			15 April 1512; Linlithgow Palace, West Lothian Son of James IV and Margaret Tudor	(1) Madeleine of Valois; Notre Dame Cathedral, Paris, France; 1 January 1537 no children (2) Mary of Guise; Notre Dame Cathedral, Paris, France; 18 May 1538 three children	14 December 1542; Falkland Palace, Fife aged 30	Son of James IV (primogeniture)
Mary I (Màiri Stiùbhairt); 1542–1567			8 December 1542; Linlithgow Palace Daughter of James V and Mary of Guise	(1) François II, King of France; 24 April 1558 no children (2) Henry Stuart, Lord Darnley; Holyrood Palace, Edinburgh; 9 July 1565 one child (3) James Hepburn, 4th Earl of Bothwell; Holyrood Palace; 15 May 1567 no children	8 February 1587; Fotheringhay Castle, Northamptonshire, England aged 44 (executed)	Daughter of James V (cognatic primogeniture)
James VI (Seumas VI Stiùbhairt); 1567–1625		until 1603 from 1603	19 June 1566; Edinburgh Castle Son of Henry Stuart, Lord Darnley and Mary I	Anne of Denmark; Old Bishop's Palace, Oslo, Norway; 23 November 1589 seven children	27 March 1625; Theobalds House, Hertfordshire, England aged 58	Son of Mary I (primogeniture)
Charles I (Teàrlach I Stiùbhairt); 1625–1649			19 November 1600; Dunfermline Palace, Dunfermline Son of James VI and Anne of Denmark	Henrietta Maria of France; St Augustine's Church, Canterbury, England; 13 June 1625 nine children	30 January 1649; Palace of Whitehall, Westminster, England aged 48 (executed)	Son of James VI (primogeniture)
Charles II (Teàrlach II Stiùbhairt); 1649–1651			29 May 1630; St James's Palace, Westminster, England Son of Charles I and Henrietta Maria of France	Catherine of Braganza; Portsmouth, England; 14 May 1662 no children	6 February 1685; Palace of Whitehall, Westminster, England aged 54	Son of Charles I (primogeniture)

=== Monarchy of Scotland restored (third time) ===
==== House of Stuart restored (1660–1707) ====
With the Scottish Restoration, the Stuarts became Kings of Scotland once more but Scotland's rights were not respected. During the reign of Charles II the Scottish Parliament was dissolved and James was appointed Governor of Scotland. James II himself became James VII in 1685. His Catholicism was not tolerated, and he was driven out of England after three years. In his place came his daughter Mary and her husband William of Orange, the ruler of the Dutch Republic. The two were accepted as monarchs of Scotland after a period of deliberation by the Scottish Parliament, and ruled together as William II and Mary II.

An attempt to establish a Scottish colonial empire through the Darien Scheme, in rivalry to that of England, failed, leaving the Scottish nobles who financed the venture for their own profit bankrupt. This coincided with the accession of Queen Anne, daughter of James VII. Anne had multiple children but none of these survived her, leaving as her heir her half-brother, James, then living in exile in France. The English favoured the Protestant Sophia of Hanover (a granddaughter of James VI) as heir. Many Scots preferred Prince James, who as a Stuart was a Scot by ancestry, and threatened to break the Union of Crowns between England and Scotland by choosing him for themselves. To preserve the union, the English elaborated a plan whereby the two Kingdoms of Scotland and England would merge into a single Kingdom, the Kingdom of Great Britain, ruled by a common monarch, and with a single Parliament. Both national parliaments agreed to this (the Scots albeit reluctantly, motivated primarily by the national finances), and some subterfuge as a total majority of signatories was needed to ratify the Scottish parliament's assent, bribes and payments. Thereafter, although monarchs continued to rule over the nation of Scotland, they did so first as monarchs of Great Britain, and from 1801 of the United Kingdom.

Name	Portrait	Arms	Birth	Marriage(s)	Death	Succession
Charles II (Teàrlach II Stiùbhairt); 1660–1685			29 May 1630; St James's Palace, Westminster, England Son of Charles I and Henrietta Maria of France	Catherine of Braganza; Portsmouth, England; 14 May 1662 no children	6 February 1685; Palace of Whitehall, Westminster, England aged 54	son of Charles I (primogeniture)
James VII (Seumas VII Stiùbhairt); 1685–1688			14 October 1633; St James's Palace, Westminster, England Son of Charles I and Henrietta Maria of France	(1) Anne Hyde; The Strand, London, England; 3 September 1660 eight children (2) Mary of Modena; Dover, England; 21 November 1673 seven children	16 September 1701; Château de Saint-Germain-en-Laye, France aged 67	son of Charles I (primogeniture)
Mary II (Màiri II Stiùbhairt); 1689–1694			30 April 1662; St James's Palace, England Daughter of James VII (II of England) and Anne Hyde	St James's Palace; 4 November 1677 three children (none survived infancy)	28 December 1694; Kensington Palace, England aged 32	grandchildren of Charles I (offered the crown by the Parliament)
William II (Uilleam Orains, "William of Orange"); 1689–1702		until 1694 from 1694	4 November 1650; The Hague, Dutch Republic Son of William II, Prince of Orange and Mary, Princess Royal	St James's Palace; 4 November 1677 three children (none survived infancy)	8 March 1702; Kensington Palace aged 51	grandchildren of Charles I (offered the crown by the Parliament)
Anne (Anna Stiùbhairt); 1702–1707; Queen of Great Britain and Ireland; 1707–1714			6 February 1665; St James's Palace Daughter of James VII and Anne Hyde	George of Denmark; St James's Palace; 28 July 1683; 17 children	1 August 1714; Kensington Palace aged 49	daughter of James VII (primogeniture; Bill of Rights 1689)

== Britain ==
=== House of Stuart (1707–1714) ===
Anne had been Queen of England, Scotland and Ireland since 8 March 1702, and so became Queen of Great Britain upon the Union of England and Scotland. (Her total reign was 12 years and 21 weeks.)

Name	Portrait	Arms	Birth	Marriage(s)	Death	Succession	Ref.
→							
Anne; 1 May 1707 – 1 August 1714 (7 years, 92 days)			6 February 1665; St James's Palace Daughter of James II of England (and VII of Scotland) and Anne Hyde	Prince George of Denmark; St James's Palace; 28 July 1683; No surviving children	1 August 1714; Kensington Palace; Aged: 49 years, 176 days	Daughter of James II of England Cognatic primogeniture Bill of Rights 1689	

=== House of Hanover (1714–1901) ===
The Hanoverian succession came about as a result of the Act of Settlement 1701, passed by the Parliament of England, which excluded "Papists" (i.e. Roman Catholics) from the succession. In return for access to the English plantations in North America and the West Indies, the Hanoverian succession and the Union were ratified by the Parliament of Scotland in 1707.

After the death of Anne, with no living children, her second cousin, George Louis, was the closest heir to the throne who was not Catholic. George was the son of Sophia of Hanover—granddaughter of James VI and I through his daughter Elizabeth. (Note: For a family tree showing King George I's relationship to Queen Anne, see George I of Great Britain § Family tree.) The Hanoverian kings of Great Britain retained their German titles, first as electors of Hanover/dukes of Brunswick-Lüneburg and later as kings of Hanover; the two lands were ruled as separate states in personal union. The Hanoverian lands were separated when Queen Victoria ascended the throne of Great Britain; as German succession law prevented women from inheriting the Hanoverian throne, her uncle Ernest Augustus inherited in her stead.

Name	Portrait	Arms	Birth	Marriage(s)	Death	Succession	Ref.
George I George Louis; 1 August 1714 (Note: King George I was crowned on 20 October 1714.) – 11 June 1727 (12 years, 315 days)			28 May 1660; Leineschloss Son of Ernest Augustus of Brunswick-Lüneburg and Sophia of Hanover	Sophia Dorothea of Brunswick-Lüneburg-Celle; 21 November 1682; 2 children	11 June 1727; Osnabrück; Aged 67 years, 30 days	Great-grandson of James VI and I Act of Settlement Eldest son of Sophia of Hanover	
George II; George Augustus; 11 June 1727 (Note: King George II was crowned on 11 October 1727 with Queen Caroline.) (Note: Dates of start of reign and coronation given in Old Style calendar; date of death in New Style. (Duration of reign takes this into account.)) – 25 October 1760 (33 years, 126 days)			30 October 1683; Herrenhausen Son of George I and Sophia Dorothea of Brunswick-Lüneburg-Celle	Caroline of Brandenburg-Ansbach; 22 August 1705; Herrenhausen; 8 children	25 October 1760; Kensington Palace; Aged 76 years, 361 days	Son of George I	
George III; George William Frederick; 25 October 1760 (Note: King George III was crowned on 22 September 1761 with Queen Charlotte.) – 29 January 1820 (59 years, 97 days)		Until 1801 1801–1816 From 1816	4 June 1738; Norfolk House Son of Prince Frederick and Augusta of Saxe-Gotha	Charlotte of Mecklenburg-Strelitz; St James's Palace; 8 September 1761; 15 children	29 January 1820; Windsor Castle; Aged 81 years, 239 days	Grandson of George II	
George IV; George Augustus Frederick; 29 January 1820 (Note: King George IV was crowned on 19 July 1821.) – 26 June 1830 (10 years, 149 days)			12 August 1762; St James's Palace Son of George III and Charlotte of Mecklenburg-Strelitz	(1) Maria Fitzherbert; Park Lane; 15 September 1785; No verified children (2) Caroline of Brunswick-Wolfenbüttel; St James's Palace; 8 April 1795; 1 daughter	26 June 1830; Windsor Castle; Aged 67 years, 318 days	Sons of George III	
William IV; William Henry; 26 June 1830 (Note: King William IV was crowned on 8 September 1831 with Queen Adelaide.) – 20 June 1837 (6 years, 360 days)			21 August 1765; Buckingham Palace Son of George III and Charlotte of Mecklenburg-Strelitz	Adelaide of Saxe-Meiningen; Kew Palace; 13 July 1818; 2 daughters	20 June 1837; Windsor Castle; Aged 71 years, 303 days	Sons of George III	
Victoria; Alexandrina Victoria; 20 June 1837 (Note: Queen Victoria was crowned on 28 June 1838.) – 22 January 1901 (63 years, 217 days)			24 May 1819; Kensington Palace Daughter of the Duke of Kent and Strathearn and Victoria of Saxe-Coburg-Saalfeld	Albert of Saxe-Coburg and Gotha; St James's Palace; 10 February 1840; 9 children	22 January 1901; Osborne House aged 81 years, 243 days	Granddaughter of George III	

=== Houses of Saxe-Coburg and Gotha (1901–1917) and Windsor (from 1917) ===
Because his father, Albert, Prince Consort, was of the House of Saxe-Coburg and Gotha, Edward VII inaugurated a new royal house when he succeeded his mother Victoria, the last monarch of the House of Hanover, in 1901. George V changed the name of the House of Saxe-Coburg-Gotha to the House of Windsor on 17 July 1917, during the First World War, because of wartime anti-German sentiment in the country. Descendants of Prince Philip, Duke of Edinburgh and Queen Elizabeth II belong to the House of Windsor by Royal Command (9 April 1952 Declaration by Queen Elizabeth II to her Privy Council) although under the usual rules of genealogy they are, by paternal descent, also members of the Glücksburg branch of the House of Oldenburg (the ruling House of Denmark and of the former Kingdom of Greece). Accordingly, King Charles III is the first monarch of the House of Windsor who is a patrilineal descendant of the Glücksburg dynasty.

Name	Portrait	Arms	Birth	Marriage(s)	Death	Succession	Ref.
Edward VII; Albert Edward; 22 January 1901 (Note: King Edward VII was crowned on 9 August 1902 with Queen Alexandra.) – 6 May 1910 (9 years, 105 days)			9 November 1841; Buckingham Palace Son of Queen Victoria and Albert of Saxe-Coburg and Gotha	Alexandra of Denmark; St George's Chapel; 10 March 1863; 6 children	6 May 1910; Buckingham Palace aged 68 years, 178 days	Son of Victoria	
George V George Frederick Ernest Albert; 6 May 1910 (Note: King George V was crowned on 22 May 1911 with Queen Mary.) – 20 January 1936 (25 years, 260 days)			3 June 1865; Marlborough House Son of Edward VII and Alexandra of Denmark	Mary of Teck; St James's Palace; 6 July 1893; 6 children	20 January 1936; Sandringham House aged 70 years, 231 days	Son of Edward VII	
Edward VIII; Edward Albert Christian George; Andrew Patrick David; 20 January 1936 (Note: King Edward VIII was not crowned.) – 11 December 1936 (Abdicated after 326 days)			23 June 1894; White Lodge Son of George V and Mary of Teck	Wallis Simpson; Château de Candé; 3 June 1937; No children	28 May 1972; Neuilly-sur-Seine aged 77 years, 340 days	Sons of George V	
George VI; Albert Frederick Arthur George; 11 December 1936 (Note: King George VI was crowned on 12 May 1937 with Queen Elizabeth.) – 6 February 1952 (15 years, 58 days)			14 December 1895; Sandringham House Son of George V and Mary of Teck	Elizabeth Bowes-Lyon; Westminster Abbey; 26 April 1923; 2 daughters	6 February 1952; Sandringham House aged 56 years, 54 days	Sons of George V	
Elizabeth II; Elizabeth Alexandra Mary; 6 February 1952 (Note: Queen Elizabeth II was crowned on 2 June 1953.) – 8 September 2022 (70 years, 214 days)			21 April 1926; Mayfair Daughter of George VI and Elizabeth Bowes-Lyon	Philip of Greece and Denmark; Westminster Abbey; 20 November 1947; 4 children	8 September 2022; Balmoral Castle; Aged 96 Years, 140 Days	Daughter of George VI	
Charles III; Charles Philip Arthur George; 8 September 2022 (Note: King Charles III was crowned on 6 May 2023 with Queen Camilla.) – present (4 years, 74 days)			14 November 1948; Buckingham Palace Son of Elizabeth II and Prince Philip, Duke of Edinburgh	(1) Diana Spencer; St Paul's Cathedral; 29 July 1981; 2 sons (2) Camilla Parker Bowles; St George's Chapel; 9 April 2005; No children	Living	Son of Elizabeth II	

== See also ==
- Alternative successions of the English crown
- Bretwalda
- Demise of the Crown
- English monarchs' family tree
- Family tree of English and British monarchs
- Heptarchy
- List of English monarchs
- List of British monarchs
- List of Irish monarchs
- List of monarchs of the British Isles by cause of death
- List of monarchs of Wessex
- Lists of monarchs in the British Isles
- List of rulers of the United Kingdom and predecessor states
- List of rulers in Wales
- List of Scottish monarchs
- Line of succession to the British throne
- Mnemonic verses of monarchs in England
- Succession to the British throne
- List of legendary kings of Britain
