= Lists of monarchs in the British Isles =

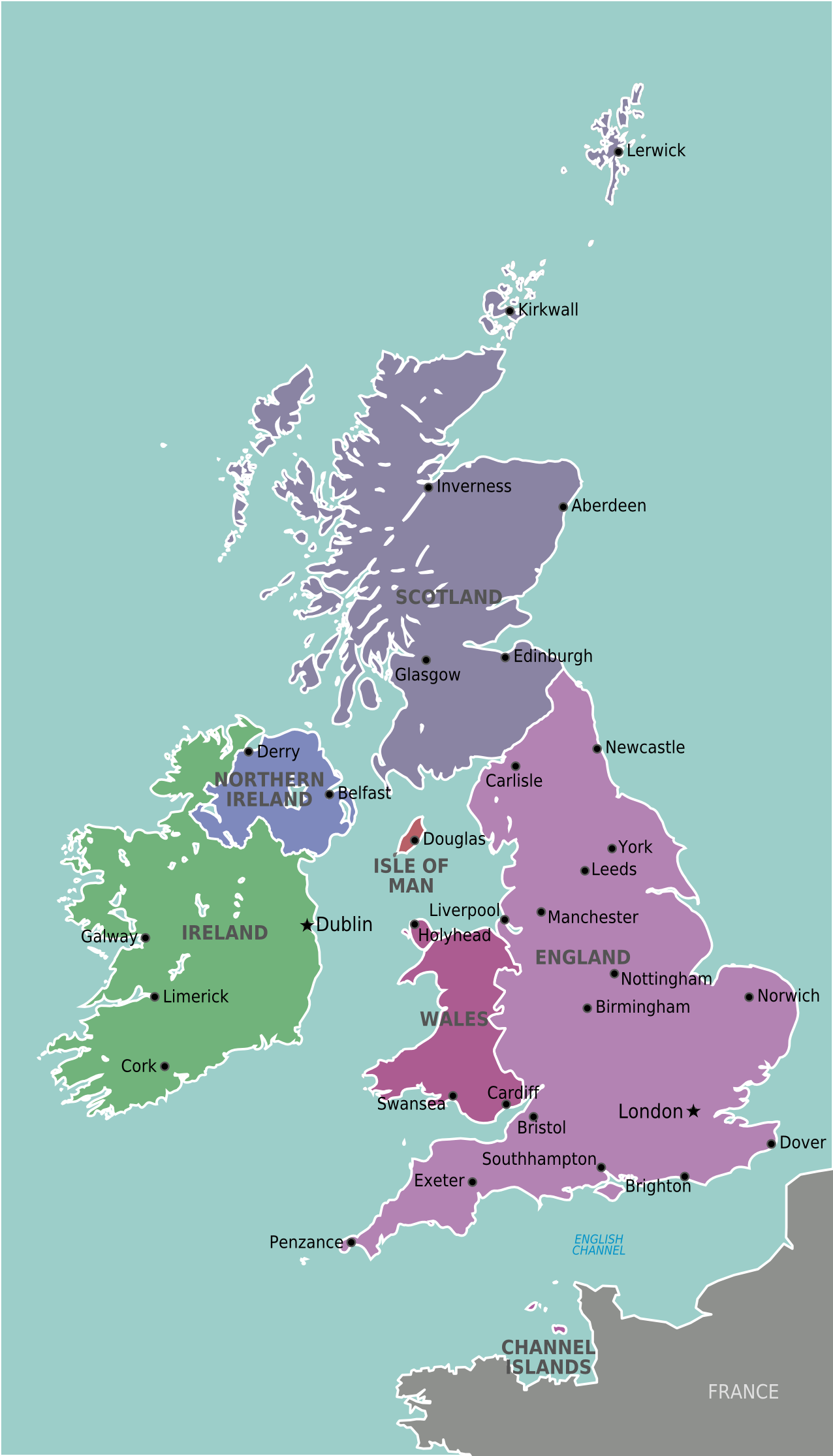
British Isles

Lists of monarchs in the British Isles are lists of monarchs that have reigned over the various kingdoms and other states that have existed in the British Isles throughout recorded history. They include monarchs of Britain as a whole, and monarchs of states that covered part or whole of what are now England, Ireland, Scotland, Wales, the Channel Islands and the Isle of Man.

== Britain ==
- Legendary kings of Britain
- List of rulers in the British Isles
- List of British monarchs (since 1707)

== England ==
- England
- Bretwalda / Heptarchy
- Kings of the Angles / Anglo-Saxon royal genealogies
- Bamburgh
- Bernicia
- Calchfynydd
- Deira
- East Anglia (earls)
- Elfed
- Essex
- Hwicce
- Isle of Wight
- Kent
- Lindsey
- Magonsæte
- Mercia (earls)
- Northumbria (earls)
- Rheged
- Sussex
- Wessex (earls)
- York (earls)

== Ireland ==
- Monarchy
- Lists of Irish kings / kingdoms
- High King / List of High Kings
- Ailech
- Airgíalla
- Brega
- Breifne
- Ciannachta
- Clandeboye
- Clanricarde
- Conaille Muirtheimne
- Connacht
- Corco Modhruadh
- Dál nAraidi
- Déisi Muman
- Desmond
- Dublin
- East Breifne
- Eilne
- Fermanagh
- Iar Connacht
- Iarmuman
- Iveagh
- Kinelarty
- Leinster
- Loch Gabhar
- Luighne Connacht
- Mac William Íochtar
- Magh Luirg
- Meath
- Munster
- Ormond
- Osraige
- Síol Anmchadha
- Sliabh Lugha
- Tara
- Thomond
- Tory
- Tyrconnell
- Tyrone
- Uí Cheinnselaig
- Uí Díarmata
- Uí Failghe
- Uí Fiachrach Aidhne
- Ui Fiachrach Muaidhe
- Uí Maine
- Uisnech
- Ulster
- Umhaill
- Waterford
- West Breifne

== Scotland ==
- Scotland
- Legendary kings of Scotland
- Legendary kings of Pictland
- Aeron
- Dál Riata
- Eidyn
- Galloway
- Galwyddel
- Gododdin (Manaw Gododdin)
- Isles / Isles (lords) / Islay
- Moray
- Orkney (Caithness)
- Picts
- Rhinns
- Strathclyde

== Wales ==
- List of rulers in Wales
- Legendary rulers of Wales
- King of Wales
- Prince of Wales
- Brycheiniog
- Ceredigion (Seisyllwg)
- Deheubarth
- Dyfed (Rheinwg)
- Ergyng
- Glywysing
- Gwent
- Gwynedd (Dunoding)
- Morgannwg
- Penllyn
- Powys (Northern / Southern)
- Rhwng Gwy a Hafren

== Cornwall ==
- Dumnonia
- Legendary rulers of Cornwall
- Earl of Cornwall
- Duke of Cornwall

== Channel Islands ==
- Duke of Normandy
- Alderney
- Guernsey
- Jersey
- Sark

== Isle of Man ==
- Isle of Man
- Ynys Manau
- Mann and the Isles
- King of Mann
- Lord of Mann

== See also ==
- Monarchy of the United Kingdom
- Family tree of British monarchs
- List of monarchs of the British Isles by cause of death
- List of monarchs in Britain by length of reign
- List of office-holders of the United Kingdom and predecessor states
- List of governors of Roman Britain
- Alternative successions to the English and British Crown
- English claims to the French throne
