= Shillelagh (disambiguation) =

A shillelagh is combination cudgel and walking stick that is generally associated with Ireland and Irish folklore.

Shillelagh may also refer to:

== Places in Ireland ==
- Shillelagh, County Wicklow, a village
- Shillelagh (barony), an administrative unit of County Wicklow

== Other uses ==
- MGM-51 Shillelagh, an American anti-tank missile
- Jeweled Shillelagh, American collegiate sports trophy of the Notre Dame–USC football rivalry
