= Áed mac Colggen =

King of Leinster

Áed mac Colggen (died 738) was a king of the Uí Cheinnselaig of Leinster. Some sources incorrectly make him joint king of Leinster with Bran Becc mac Murchada, but it appears that Áed was main ruler of Leinster in 738. His father Colcú mac Bressail (died 722) was called king of Ard Ladrann (near Gorey, Co.Wexford) at his death obit in the annals in 722 which mention that he was killed. He was the great-great grandson of Crundmáel Erbuilc (died 656), a King of Leinster, and was a member of the Sil Chormaic sept.

== Biography ==
The date of his succession to the Uí Cheinnselaig throne cannot be dated with certainty. The annals record that the Ui Cheinnselaig king Laidcnén mac Con Mella was slain at the Battle of Maistiu (Mullaghmast in south County Kildare) in 727 by the Leinster king Dúnchad mac Murchado (died 728). The king lists in the Book of Leinster, have him succeeded by Élothach mac Fáelchon who ruled for seven years before being slain by Áed mac Colggen at the Battle of Oenbethi who then is listed as king.

In 722 Leinster faced an invasion by Fergal mac Máele Dúin of the Cenél nEógain, High King of Ireland, seeking to impose his overlordship on Leinster. Their armies under the king Murchad mac Brain Mut (d.727) met at the battle of Allen where Fergal was killed. The saga Cath Almaine preserves the story of this battle and mentions that Áed mac Colggen fought for Leinster where he is referred to as heir-apparent.

Áed appears as a rival to the Leinster throne during the reign of Fáelán mac Murchado (died 738) at a time when Cathal mac Finguine (died 742), King of Munster, was attempting to assert his rights over Leinster during a time of Uí Neill weakness. In 732 Aed and the southern Laigin (Laigin Desgabair) repulsed the Munstermen.

Áed, along with many other kings, was killed in battle against Fergal's son Áed Allán at Áth Senaig in 738. This fight (known as the Battle of the Groans) is described at length in the Irish annals. Áed was slain in single combat with Áed Allán and his supposed co-ruler Bran Bec also died there. The Annals of Ulster say:

And men say that so many fell in this great battle that we find no comparable slaughter in a single onslaught and fierce conflict throughout all preceding ages.

After the crushing defeat at Áth Senaig, the Uí Dúnlainge dominated the kingship of Leinster for fully three centuries until Diarmait mac Maíl na mBó became king of Leinster in 1042.

Aed was succeeded as king of Uí Chennselaig by his brother Sechnassach mac Colggen (died 746/747). Áed's son Eterscél mac Áeda (died 778) was later king of the Uí Cheinnselaig.
