= Cú Chongelt mac Con Mella =

Cú Chongelt mac Con Mella (died 724?) was a king of the Uí Cheinnselaig of South Leinster or Laigin Desgabair in what became Ireland. He was of the Sil Máeluidir sept of this branch of the Laigin, who were found in the later baronies of Shelmalier on the lower reaches of the Slaney River in southern County Wexford.

His last paternal ancestor to hold the kingship was Éogan Cáech mac Nath Í who lived in the early 6th century, of whom Cú Chongelt was a 5th generation descendant. Cú Chongelt was the great-grandson of Máel Odor mac Guairi, the eponymous founder of his sept.

Cú Chongelt succeeded to the throne on the death of his second cousin Bran Ua Máele Dúin at the Battle of Áth Buichet in 712 during infighting among the Uí Cheinnselaig. It is not determined when his reign ended. The Book of Leinster king list credited him with a reign of five years, from 712 to 717. Historian Mac Niocaill associates him with the death obit of a certain Cú Chongelt in 724 in the Annals of Ulster. His brother Laidcnén mac Con Mella (died 727) succeeded him.
