= Taileflaith =

Taileflaith (Modern Irish: Tailrfhlaith) was a rare Old Irish feminine given name used during the early Irish historic era. It was recorded in the kingdoms of Munster and Laigin.

== Notable people ==
Almost the only one attested is Taileflaith ingen Cathail (fl. 728), described as mnaoi an Dunchada, .i. Tualaith, inghean Cathail m. Finguine, ri Mumhan, (transl. Woman of Dúnchad, Tualaith, Daughter of Cathal mac Finguine, King of Munster) who died as Queen of Leinster between 749 and 754. Her husband was Dúnchad mac Murchado (died 728), and her father was Cathal mac Finguine of the Eóganacht Glendamnach (died 742), who was King of Munster or Cashel and High King of Ireland. After Dúnchad mac Murchada was defeated at the Battle of Ailenn by his younger brother Fáelán mac Murchada, Taileflaith married Fáelán. Her son by Fáelán may be Ruaidrí mac Fáeláin.

Taileflaith's son by Dúnchad, Cellach mac Dúnchada (died 776) was a king of Leinster and ancestor of the Uí Dúnlainge of the kingdom of Laigin. The families of Ó Broin, Ó Tuathail, and Mac Gilla Mo-Cholmóg are the most prominent of her descendants.

== See also ==
- List of Irish-language given names
