= Cairpre mac Laidcnén =

Cairpre mac Laidcnén (died 793) was a king of the Uí Cheinnselaig of South Leinster. He belonged to the Sil Chormaic sept of this branch of the Laigin and specifically to a branch which took over leadership of the Uí Dróna - the baronies of Idrone in modern County Carlow. His last paternal ancestor to hold the throne was his great great grandfather Crundmáel Erbuilc (died 655) He was the brother of Donngal mac Laidcnén (died 761) and Dub Calgaid mac Laidcnén (died 769). He ruled from 778 to 793.

In 780 warfare occurred between the Laigin and the high king Donnchad Midi. Caipre cooperated with the Leinster king Ruaidrí mac Fáeláin (died 785) of the Uí Dúnlainge but they were defeated at the Battle of Óchtar Ocha (at Kilcock, near Kildare). Donnchad pursued them with his adherents, and laid waste and burned their territory and churches. The battle has also been associated with a site near Kells and may have been a Laigin offensive that failed.

In 782 Caipre seems to have given his support to Bran Ardchenn mac Muiredaig (died 795) in his bid for the Leinster throne versus Ruaidrí. Bran was defeated and captured at the Battle of Curragh (near Kildare). Cairpre's brother, Dub dá Crích, was slain fighting for Bran.
