= Cathal mac Dúnlainge =

Cathal mac Dúnlainge (died 819) was a king of the Uí Cheinnselaig of South Leinster. He was of the Sil Máeluidir sept of this branch of the Laigin, who were found in the later baronies of Shelmalier on the lower reaches of the Slaney River in southern modern County Wexford. He ruled from 809 to 819.

The Uí Dróna had been the dominant sept in Uí Cheinnselaig for much of the last half of the 8th century and the last member of the Sil Máeluidir sept to hold the throne had died in 770. Cathal acquired the throne after the death of his predecessor Cellach Tosach mac Donngaile of the Uí Dróna in 809. In 814 Cathal came into conflict with the Uí Dúnlainge over kings of Leinster under Muiredach mac Brain (died 818) in which the Uí Cheinnselaig were overthrown.

Cathal appears to have attempted to take control of the local monasteries to strengthen his sept. In 817 he led forces which included men from the monastery of Tech Munnu (Taghmon) in an attack on the community of Ferns where 400 were slain by him. At his death obit in 819 he is styled King of the Uí Cheinnselaig and prior or vice abbot of Ferns
