= Family tree of the British royal family =

Royal genealogy of the United Kingdom

This is the family tree of the British royal family, from James VI and I (who united the crowns of England and Scotland) to the present monarch, Charles III.

For separate family trees before the 1603 Union of the Crowns, see Family tree of English monarchs, Family tree of Scottish monarchs, and Family tree of Welsh monarchs. This also includes England, Scotland and Wales; all part of the United Kingdom as well as the French Norman invasion.

For a simplified view, see: Family tree of British monarchs.

== Key ==
Bold borders indicate legitimate children of British monarchs	Bold Blue borders indicate both	Bold Green borders indicate UK & Commonwealth of Nations

== Tree ==
Stuart
Henry Stuart; 1545–1567	Mary; Queen of Scots; 1542–1587
James VI and I 1566–1625; King of Scotland r. 1567–1603; King of England r. 1603–1625	Anne of Denmark; 1574–1619	Henry IV; 1553–1610; King of France
Henry Frederick; 1594–1612; Prince of Wales	Elizabeth Stuart; 1596–1662	Frederick V 1596–1632; Elector Palatine; King of Bohemia	Margaret Stuart; 1598–1600	Charles I 1600–1649; King of England and Scotland r. 1625–1649	Henrietta Maria of France; 1609–1669	Robert Stuart; 1602; Duke of Kintyre and Lorne	Mary Stuart; 1605–1607	Sophia Stuart; 1606	Louis XIII; 1601–1643; King of France
Hanover	Orange
Ernest Augustus; 1629–1698; Duke of Brunswick, Elector of Hanover	Sophia; 1630–1714	Charles; 1629; Duke of Cornwall	Charles II; 1630–1685; King of Scotland r. 1649–1651; King of England and Scotland r. 1660–1685	Catherine of Braganza; 1638–1705	William II; 1626–1650; Prince of Orange	Mary Stuart; 1631–1660; Princess Royal	Anne Hyde; 1637–1671	James II (Note: Numeral as King of England); 1633–1701; King of England and Scotland r. 1685–1688	Mary of Modena; 1658–1718	also: Elizabeth Stuart; 1635–1650 Anne Stuart; 1637–1640	Henry Stuart; 1640–1660; Duke of Gloucester	Henrietta Anne; 1644–1670	Philippe I 1640–1701; Duke of Orléans
(3 children)
Sophia Dorothea; 1666–1726	George I 1660–1727; King of Great Britain r. 1714–1727	also: Frederick Augustus; 1661–1691 Maximilian William; 1666–1726 Sophia Charlotte; 1668–1705	also: Charles Philip; 1669–1690 Christian Henry; 1671–1703 Ernest Augustus; 1674–1728; Duke of York and Albany	Charles Stuart; 1660–1661; Duke of Cambridge	William III; 1650–1702; King of England and Scotland r. 1689–1702	Mary II; 1662–1694; Queen of England and Scotland r. 1689–1694	James Stuart; 1663–1667; Duke of Cambridge	Anne; 1665–1714; Queen of Great Britain r. 1707–1714	George; 1653–1708; Prince of Denmark and Norway, Duke of Cumberland	also: Charles Stuart; 1666–1667; Duke of Kendal Edgar Stuart; 1667–1671; Duke of Cambridge	also: Catherine Stuart; 1675–1676 Isabel Stuart; 1676–1681 Charles Stuart; 1677; Duke of Cambridge	also: Elizabeth Stuart; 1678 Charlotte Stuart; 1682 Louisa Maria Stuart; 1692–1712; Princess Royal	James Francis Edward Stuart; The Old Pretender; 1688–1766; Prince of Wales	Maria Clementina Sobieska; 1702–1735
Caroline of Ansbach; 1683–1737	George II; 1683–1760; King of Great Britain r. 1727–1760	Sophia Dorothea; 1687–1757	Frederick William I 1688–1740; King of Prussia	William; 1689–1700; Duke of Gloucester	Charles Edward Stuart; Bonnie Prince Charlie; 1720–1788	Henry Benedict Stuart; The Young Pretender; 1725–1807; Cardinal Duke of York
(14 children)
Augusta of Saxe-Gotha-Altenburg; 1719–1772; Princess of Wales	Frederick Louis; 1707–1751; Prince of Wales	William IV; 1711–1751; Prince of Orange	Anne; 1709–1759; Princess of Orange	Amelia Sophia Eleonore; 1711–1786	Caroline Elizabeth; 1713–1757	George William; 1717–1718	William Augustus; 1721–1765; Duke of Cumberland	Mary; 1723–1772	Frederick II; 1720–1785; Landgrave of Hesse-Kassel	Louise; 1724–1751	Frederick V 1723–1766; King of Denmark and Norway
(2 children)	(2 other children)
(3 other children)
Augusta; 1737–1813	Charles William Ferdinand; 1735–1806; Prince of Brunswick-Wolfenbüttel and Duke of Brunswick-Lüneburg	George III; 1738–1820; King of Great Britain r. 1760–1801; King of the United Kingdom r. 1801–1820	Charlotte of Mecklenburg-Strelitz; 1744–1818	Edward; 1739–1767; Duke of York and Albany	Elizabeth Caroline; 1741–1759	William Henry; 1743–1805; Duke of Gloucester and Edinburgh	also: Henry; 1745–1790; Duke of Cumberland and Strathearn Louisa Anne; 1749–1768 Frederick William; 1750–1765	Caroline Matilda; 1751–1775	Christian VII; 1749–1808; King of Denmark and Norway	William I 1743–1821; Elector of Hesse	Wilhelmina Caroline of Denmark; 1747–1820	Charles of Hesse-Kassel; 1744–1836	Louise of Denmark; 1750–1831
Ernest Augustus; 1771–1851; King of Hanover	Frederica of Mecklenburg-Strelitz; 1778–1841	Augustus Frederick; 1773–1843; Duke of Sussex	Adolphus Frederick; 1774–1850; Duke of Cambridge m. Augusta of Hesse-Kassel; 1797–1889	William Frederick; 1776–1834; Duke of Gloucester and Edinburgh	Mary; 1776–1857	Sophia; 1777–1848	Octavius; 1779–1783	Alfred; 1780–1782	Amelia; 1783–1810
George V 1819–1878; King of Hanover	Augusta; 1822–1916	George; 1819–1904; Duke of Cambridge	Mary Adelaide; 1833–1897	Francis; 1837–1900; Duke of Teck
Caroline of Brunswick-Wolfenbüttel; 1768–1821	George IV; 1762–1830; King of the United Kingdom r. 1820–1830	Frederick Augustus; 1763–1827; Duke of York and Albany	Frederica Charlotte of Prussia; 1767–1820	Adelaide of Saxe-Meiningen; 1792–1849	William IV; 1765–1837; King of the United Kingdom r. 1830–1837	Charlotte; 1766–1828; Princess Royal m. Frederick I 1754–1816; King of Württemberg	Edward Augustus; 1767–1820; Duke of Kent and Strathearn	Victoria of Saxe-Coburg-Saalfeld; 1786–1861	Augusta Sophia; 1768–1840	Elizabeth ("Eliza"); 1770–1840	Frederick VI; 1769–1829; Landgrave of Hesse-Homburg
Saxe-Coburg and Gotha
Leopold I 1790–1865; King of the Belgians	Charlotte; 1796–1817	Charlotte; 1819	Elizabeth; 1820–1821	Albert; 1819–1861; Prince of Saxe-Coburg and Gotha	Victoria; 1819–1901; Queen of the United Kingdom r. 1837–1901
Frederick III; 1831–1888; German Emperor, King of Prussia	Victoria; 1840–1901; Princess Royal	Alexandra of Denmark; 1844–1925	Edward VII; 1841–1910; King of the United Kingdom r. 1901–1910	Alice; 1843–1878	Louis IV; 1837–1892; Grand Duke of Hesse	Alfred; 1844–1900; Duke of Edinburgh/Saxe-Coburg and Gotha	Maria Alexandrovna of Russia; 1853–1920	Helena; 1846–1923 m. Christian of Schleswig-Holstein; 1831–1917	Louise; 1848–1939 m. John Campbell; 1845–1914; Duke of Argyll	Arthur; 1850–1942; Duke of Connaught and Strathearn m. Louise Margaret of Prussia; 1860–1917	Leopold; 1853–1884; Duke of Albany m. Helen of Waldeck and Pyrmont; 1861–1922	Beatrice; 1857–1944 m. Henry of Battenberg; 1858–1896
7 other children	7 other children	4 surviving children	4 children
Wilhelm II; 1859–1941; German Emperor, King of Prussia	Windsor	also: Alfred; 1874–1899 Marie; 1875–1938	Victoria Melita; 1876–1936	Ernest Louis; 1868–1937; Grand Duke of Hesse	Alexandra; 1878–1942	Beatrice; 1884–1966	Margaret; 1882–1920	Arthur; 1883–1938	Patricia; 1886–1974	Alice; 1883–1981	Charles Edward; Duke of Albany/Saxe-Coburg and Gotha; 1884–1954
Albert Victor; 1864–1892; Duke of Clarence and Avondale	George V 1865–1936; King of the United Kingdom r. 1910–1936	Mary of Teck; 1867–1953	Louise; 1867–1931; Princess Royal	Alexander Duff; 1849–1912; Duke of Fife	Victoria; 1868–1935	Maud; 1869–1938	Haakon VII; 1872–1957; King of Norway	Alexander John; 1871
Wallis Simpson; 1896–1986	Edward VIII; 1894–1972; King of the United Kingdom r. 1936; Duke of Windsor	George VI; 1895–1952; King of the United Kingdom r. 1936–1952	Elizabeth; 1900–2002	Mary; 1897–1965; Princess Royal	Henry Lascelles; 1882–1947; Earl of Harewood	Henry; 1900–1974; Duke of Gloucester	Alice; 1901–2004	George; 1902–1942; Duke of Kent	Marina of Greece and Denmark; 1906–1968	John; 1905–1919
Philip of Greece and Denmark; 1921–2021; Duke of Edinburgh	Elizabeth II; 1926–2022; Queen of the United Kingdom r. 1952–2022	Margaret; 1930–2002; Countess of Snowdon	Antony Armstrong-Jones; 1930–2017; Earl of Snowdon	William; 1941–1972	Richard b. 1944; Duke of Gloucester	Birgitte b. 1946	Edward b. 1935; Duke of Kent	Katharine; 1933–2025	Alexandra b. 1936	Angus Ogilvy; 1928–2004	Michael b. 1942	Marie-Christine b. 1945
Diana; 1961–1997; Princess of Wales	Charles III b. 1948; King of the United Kingdom r. 2022–present	Camilla b. 1947	Mark Phillips b. 1948	Anne b. 1950; Princess Royal	Timothy Laurence b. 1955	Andrew Mountbatten-Windsor b. 1960	Sarah b. 1959	Edward; Duke of Edinburgh b. 1964	Sophie b. 1965
William b. 1982; Prince of Wales (1st in line (Note: The first six people in the line of succession are noted here because they must obtain the monarch's consent before marrying.))	Catherine b. 1982; Princess of Wales	Harry b. 1984; Duke of Sussex (5th in line)	Meghan b. 1981	Edoardo Mapelli Mozzi b. 1983	Beatrice b. 1988	Eugenie b. 1990	Jack Brooksbank b. 1986	Louise b. 2003	James b. 2007; Earl of Wessex
George b. 2013 (2nd in line)	Charlotte b. 2015 (3rd in line)	Louis b. 2018 (4th in line)	Archie b. 2019 (6th in line)	Lilibet b. 2021

== See also ==
- House of Windsor
- House of Hanover
- House of Stuart
- House of Tudor
- Family tree of British monarchs
- Alternative successions of the English crown
- Line of succession to the British throne
- Monarchy of the United Kingdom
- List of English monarchs
- List of Scottish monarchs
- List of British monarchs
