= Fáelán mac Murchada =

Fáelán mac Murchada (died 738) was a King of Leinster from the Uí Dúnlainge branch of the Laigin. He was the son of Murchad mac Brain Mut (died 727), a previous king. He ruled from 728 to 738.

He is first mentioned in the annals in 727 when he won a victory at the Battle of Bairenn or Inis Bregainn leading the men of Liffey over Eterscél mac Cellaig of the Uí Máil of Cualu and Congal mac Brain who were slain. In 728 he acquired the throne of Leinster by slaying his elder brother Dúnchad mac Murchada (died 728) at the Battle of Ailenn (Co.Kildare).

The weakness of the Ui Neill at this time led Cathal mac Finguine (died 742), the King of Munster, to assert his claims over Leinster. In 735 was fought the Battle of Belach Éile between the Leinstermen and Munstermen with much slaughter on both sides. Cellach mac Fáelchair of the Osraige was slain fighting for Cathal who was defeated. The Annals of Innisfallen, however, claim that Cathal won the battle. The location of the battle makes it probable that Cellach of the Osraige was the aggressor and was taking advantage of the rivalry of Faelan with Áed mac Colggen (died 738) of the Uí Cheinnselaig. In 738 Cathal was able to lead a hosting into Leinster and took hostages and treasure from Faelan who then died that year at an "unripe" age. The Annals of Tigernach claim it was his brother Bran Becc mac Murchada (died 738) whom the hostages were taken from but it was more probably Faelan.

Faelan had married his brother's widow Tualath ingen Cathail, daughter of Cathal of Munster. He was the ancestor of the Uí Fáeláin sept of the Ui Dunlainge ruling at Naas in the eastern part of the Liffey plain, Airthir Liphi. His son Ruaidrí mac Fáeláin (died 785) was a King of Leinster.

== See also ==
- Kings of Leinster
