= Cellach mac Dúnchada =

King of Leinster between 760 and 776

Cellach mac Dúnchada (died 776) was a King of Leinster of the Uí Dúnchada sept of the Uí Dúnlainge branch of the Laigin. He was the son of Dúnchad mac Murchado (died 728), and Taileflaith. This sept had their royal seat at Líamhain (Lyons Hill, on the Dublin-Kildare border). He ruled from 760 to 776.

During his reign the southern dynasty of Uí Cheinnselaig were preoccupied with war with the Osraige in 761 and civil wars in 769–770. The first mention of Cellach in the annals involves the Battle of Áth Orc (in County Offaly) in 770. In this battle Cellach defeated Cináed mac Flainn of the Uí Failge and Cathnio mac Bécce of the Fothairt, who were slain.

Leinster had suffered a major defeat at the hands of the high king Áed Allán of the Cenél nEógain at the Battle of Áth Senaig (Ballyshannon, Co. Kildare) in 738. A period of peace existed under the high kings Domnall Midi (died 763) of the Clann Cholmáin and Niall Frossach (died 778) of the Cenél nEógain. In 770, however, the new high king Donnchad Midi (died 797) of the Clann Cholmáin asserted his suzerainty over Leinster. Donnchad invaded with the army of the Ui Neill and the Laigin eluded him. Donnchad remained seven days in the vicinity of the ancient hill fort of Ráith Ailenn (in Co.Kildare) and ravaged the country with fire until the men of Leinster submitted to him.

That same year of 770 the two septs of the Síl nÁedo Sláine branch of the southern Uí Néill made border attacks on Leinster territory. The sept of Uí Chonaing defeated the Uí Théig at the Battle of Áth Cliath in Cualu (southern Dublin Co.) with a slaughter of Laigin but many of the victors drowned in a high tide on their way home. The sept of Uí Chernaig was defeated at the Battle of Bolg Bóinne.

Cellach's son, Fínsnechta Cethardec mac Cellaig (died 808), was also King of Leinster. His sons Fáelán (died 804) and Áed (died 829) were abbots of Kildare and his daughter Muirenn (died 831) was abbess of Kildare.
