= Élothach mac Fáelchon =

Irish king

Élothach mac Fáelchon (died c. 734) was a king of the Uí Cheinnselaig of South Leinster. He was the grandson of a previous king Fáelán mac Síláin and was a member of the Síl Fáelchán sept of this branch of the Laigin.

== Overview ==
He is listed as the successor to Laidcnén mac Con Mella (died 727) in the king list in the Book of Leinster and given a reign of seven years which gives a possible date for his rule of 727-734. However, his successor Áed mac Colggen (died 738) of the Sil Chormaic is active in the annals in 732 leading the forces of South Leinster versus Munster. Élothach was defeated and slain at the Battle of Oenbethi by his successor Áed mac Colggen.

He was the founder of a sept known as the Síl nÉladaig and gave their name to the barony of Shillelagh in County Wicklow.
