= Shillelagh (barony) =

Land unit in Wicklow, Ireland

Shillelagh Síol Éalaigh (Irish)
- Barony
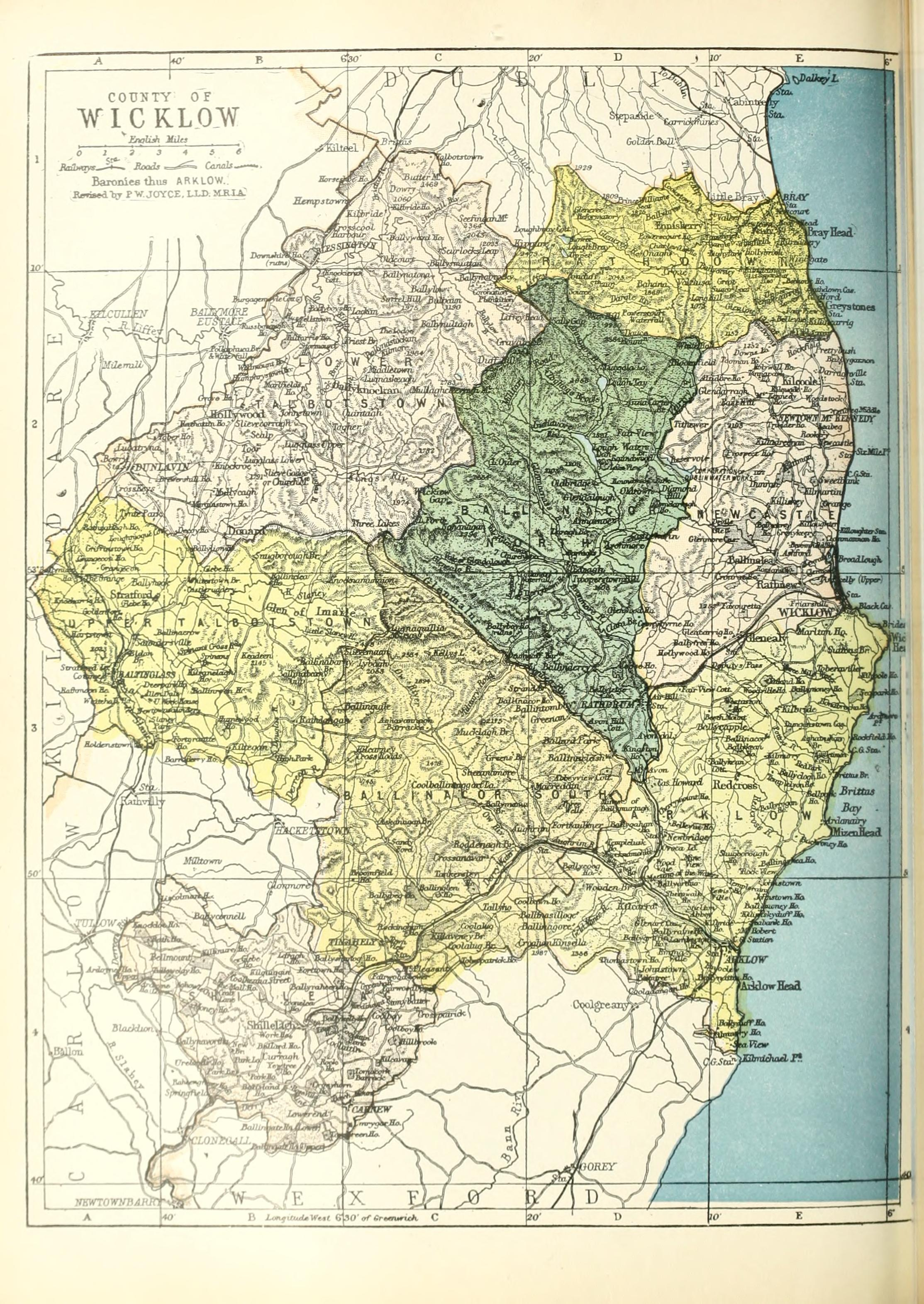
- Baronies of County Wicklow. Shillelagh is in the southwest.
- Sovereign state: Ireland
- County: Wicklow

Area
  - Total: 179.47 km^{2} (69.29 sq mi)

Shillelagh (Irish: Síol Éalaigh) is a barony in County Wicklow, Ireland.

== Etymology ==
Shillelagh barony derives its name from the Síol Elaigh, a local people who claimed descent from Élothach mac Fáelchon, and from the village of Shillelagh.

== Location ==
Shillelagh barony is located in southwest County Wicklow.

== History ==
Derived from Síol Elaigh, meaning descendants of Ealach. O'Dunlaing (O'Dowling) was noted as a chief of Síl n-Elathaig, a branch of the Síl Mella. The Ua Tuathail (O'Tooles) were driven here in the late 12th century, following the Cambro-Norman invasion. The territory was also controlled by the Ó Gaoithín (O'Gahans) for a period

== List of settlements ==
Below is a list of settlements in Shillelagh barony:

- Carnew
- Coolboy
- Shillelagh
- Aghowle, a civil parish of the barony
