= Family tree of British monarchs =

The following is a simplified family tree of the English, Scottish, and British monarchs.

For more-detailed charts see:

- Family tree of English monarchs, from Alfred the Great and Æthelstan to Elizabeth I;
- Family tree of Scottish monarchs, from Kenneth MacAlpin also to James VI and I;
- Family tree of Welsh monarchs; and
- Family tree of the British royal family from James VI and I to the present.

== List of monarchs ==
Alpín mac Echdach d. 834
House of Alpin
Domnall I MacAilpín; 812–862; King of the Picts r. 858–862	Kenneth I MacAilpín; 810–858; King of the Picts r. 843–858
House of Wessex
Alfred the Great; 849–899; King of the Anglo-Saxons r. 871–899	Giric c. 832–889; King of the Picts r. 878–889	Constantín I mac Cináeda d. 877; King of the Picts r. 862–877	Áed mac Cináeda d. 878; King of the Picts r. 877–878	?	Run; King of Alt Clut r. 872–878(?)
Edward the Elder c. 874/877–924; King of the Anglo-Saxons r. 899–924	Donald II mac Causantín d. 900; King of Alba r. 889–900	Constantine II before 879–952; King of Alba r. 900–943	Eochaid (fl. 878–889); King of the Picts r. 878–889(?)
Æthelstan c. 894–939; King of the English r. 924–939	Edmund I 921–946; King of the English r. 939–946	Eadred; 923–955; King of the English r. 946–955	Malcolm I c. 900–954; King of Alba r. 943–954	Indulf d. 962; King of Alba r. 954–962
House of Normandy
Richard I 933–996; Duke of Normandy	Eadwig; All-Fair c. 940–959; King of the English r. 955–959	Edgar I the Peaceful c. 943–975; King of the English r. 959–975	Dub c. 928–967; King of Alba r. 962–967	Kenneth II before 954–995; King of Alba r. 971–995	Amlaíb mac Ilduilb d. 977; King of Alba r. 973–977	Cuilén d. 971; King of Alba r. 967–971
House of Knýtlinga
Richard II; 963–1026; Duke of Normandy	Sweyn; Forkbeard; 963–1014; King of the English r. 1013–1014	Kenneth III c. 966–1005; King of Alba r. 997–1005	Malcolm II c. 980–1034; King of Scots r. 1005–1034	Constantine III before 971–997; King of Alba r. 995–997
Edward the Martyr c. 962–978; King of the English r. 975–978	Æthelred the Unready c. 968–1016; King of the English r. 978–1013, r. 1014–1016	Emma of Normandy c. 984–1052	Cnut the Great c. 985/995–1035; King of England r. 1016–1035	Boite mac Cináeda d. 1058	Donada	Bethóc
House of Godwin	House of Moray	House of Dunkeld
Robert I 1000–1035; Duke of Normandy	Edmund II; Ironside c. 990–1016; King of the English r. 1016	Godwin; 1001–1053; Earl of Wessex	Edward the Confessor c. 1003–1066; King of the English r. 1042–1066	Gruoch of Scotland fl. 1020–1054	Macbeth; 1005–1057; King of Alba r. 1040–1057	Duncan I c. 1001–1040; King of Alba r. 1034–1040
Edward the Exile; 1016–1057	Edith of Wessex c. 1025–1075	Harold II; Godwinson c. 1022–1066; King of the English r. 1066	Harthacnut c. 1018–1042; King of England r. 1040–1042	Harold I Harefoot c. 1015–1040; King of England r. 1037–1040	Lulach the fool before 1033–1058; King of Alba r. 1057–1058
William I the Conqueror c. 1028–1087; King of England r. 1066–1087	Saint Margaret of Scotland c. 1045–1093	Malcolm III; Canmore c. 1031–1093; King of Scots r. 1058–1093	Donald III; Bane c. 1039–1099; King of Scots r. 1093–1094, r. 1094–1097
William II c. 1056–1100; King of England r. 1087–1100	Adela of Normandy c. 1067–1137	Henry I c. 1068–1135; King of England r. 1100–1135	Matilda of Scotland; 1080–1118	Edgar c. 1074–1107; King of Scots r. 1097–1107	Alexander I c. 1078–1124; King of Scots r. 1107–1124	David I 1084–1153; King of Scots r. 1124–1153	Duncan II c. 1060–1094; King of Scots r. 1094
House of Blois
Stephen of Blois c. 1092/1096–1154; King of England r. 1135–1141, r. 1141–1154	Empress Matilda; 1102–1167; Queen of England (Disputed) r. 1141	Henry of Scotland; 1114–1152; Earl of Huntingdon
House of Plantagenet / Angevins
Henry II; 1133–1189; King of England r. 1154–1189	William I the Lion c. 1143–1214; King of Scots r. 1165–1214	Malcolm IV; 1141–1165; King of Scots r. 1153–1165	David of Scotland c. 1144–1219; Earl of Huntingdon	Marjorie of Scotland
Richard I 1157–1199; King of England r. 1189–1199	John; 1166–1216; King of England r. 1199–1216	Margaret of Huntingdon	Isobel of Huntingdon	Bethóc of Angus	Walter of Dundonald d. 1246; High Steward
House of Plantagenet
Henry III; 1207–1272; King of England r. 1216–1272	Joan of England; 1210–1238	Alexander II; 1198–1249; King of Scots r. 1214–1249	Dervorguilla of Galloway c. 1210–1290	Robert V de Brus c. 1210–1295	Margaret Stewart	Alexander Stewart; 1214–1283; High Steward
House of Balliol	Clan Bruce
Edward I 1239–1307; King of England r. 1272–1307	Margaret of England; 1240–1275	Alexander III; 1241–1286; King of Scots r. 1249–1286	John Balliol c. 1249–1314; King of Scots r. 1292–1296	Robert VI de Brus; 1243–1304; Lord of Annandale	Marjorie of Carrick c. 1253/1256–c. 1292
Margaret of Scotland; 1261–1283	Eric II of Norway; 1268–1299	Isabel Bruce c. 1272–1358	Robert I the Bruce; 1274–1329; King of Scots r. 1306–1329	James Stewart c. 1260–1309; High Steward
House of Sverre
Edward II; 1284–1327; King of England r. 1307–1327	Margaret; Maid of Norway; 1283–1290; Queen of Scots r. 1286–1290	Marjorie Bruce; 1296–1316	Walter Stewart c. 1296–1327; High Steward
House of Stewart
Edward III; 1312–1377; King of England r. 1327–1377	Joan of the Tower; 1321–1362	David II; 1324–1371; King of Scots r. 1329–1371	Robert II; 1316–1390; King of Scots r. 1371–1390
House of Lancaster	House of York
Edward of Woodstock; 1330–1376; The Black Prince	John of Gaunt; 1340–1399; Duke of Lancaster	Edmund of Langley; 1341–1402; Duke of York	Robert III; 1337–1406; King of Scots r. 1390–1406
Richard II; 1367–1400; King of England r. 1377–1399	Henry IV; 1367–1413; King of England r. 1399–1413	John Beaufort; 1373–1410; Earl of Somerset
Henry V 1386–1422; King of England r. 1413–1422	John Beaufort; 1403–1444; Duke of Somerset	Richard of Conisburgh; 1385–1415; Earl of Cambridge	Joan Beaufort c. 1404–1445	James I 1394–1437; King of Scots r. 1406–1437
Henry VI; 1421–1471; King of England r. 1422–1461, r. 1470–1471	Richard of York; 1411–1460; Duke of York	James II; 1430–1460; King of Scots r. 1437–1460
Margaret Beaufort; 1441/1443–1509	Edward IV; 1442–1483; King of England r. 1461–1470, r. 1471–1483	Richard III; 1452–1485; King of England r. 1483–1485	James III; 1451–1488; King of Scots r. 1460–1488
House of Tudor
Henry VII; 1457–1509; King of England r. 1485–1509	Elizabeth of York; 1466–1503	Edward V 1470–1483; King of England r. 1483
Henry VIII; 1491–1547; King of England r. 1509–1547	Mary Tudor; 1496–1533	Archibald Douglas c. 1489–1557; Earl of Angus	Margaret Tudor; 1489–1541	James IV; 1473–1513; King of Scots r. 1488–1513
House of Habsburg	Grey family
Philip; 1527–1598; King of England, jure uxoris r. 1554–1558; King of Spain	Mary I 1516–1558; Queen of England r. 1553–1558	Frances Brandon; 1517–1559	Margaret Douglas; 1515–1578	James V 1512–1542; King of Scots r. 1513–1542
Elizabeth I 1533–1603; Queen of England r. 1558–1603	Edward VI; 1537–1553; King of England r. 1547–1553	Jane; 1536/1537–1554; Queen of England Disputed r. 1553	Henry Stuart; 1545–1567; Lord Darnley	Mary I 1542–1587; Queen of Scots r. 1542–1567
James VI and I 1566–1625; King of Scots r. 1567–1625; King of England r. 1603–1625
Elizabeth; 1596–1662; Electress Palatine	Charles I 1600–1649; King of England and Scotland r. 1625–1649
House of Hanover
Sophia of Hanover; 1630–1714; Electress of Brunswick	Charles II; 1630–1685; King of Scotland r. 1649–1651, r. 1660–1685; King of England r. 1660–1685	Mary; 1631–1660; Princess Royal	James II and VII; 1633–1701; King of England and Scotland r. 1685–1688
George I 1660–1727; King of Great Britain r. 1714–1727	William III and II; 1650–1702; King of England and Scotland r. 1689–1702	Mary II; 1662–1694; Queen of England and Scotland r. 1689–1694	Anne; 1665–1714; Queen of England and Scotland, then Great Britain r. 1702–1714
George II; 1683–1760; King of Great Britain r. 1727–1760
Frederick; 1707–1751; Prince of Wales
George III; 1738–1820; King of Great Britain, then the United Kingdom r. 1760–1820
George IV; 1762–1830 regent 1811–1820; King of the United Kingdom r. 1820–1830	William IV; 1765–1837; King of the United Kingdom r. 1830–1837	Edward; 1767–1820; Duke of Kent and Strathearn
Victoria; 1819–1901; Queen of the United Kingdom r. 1837–1901
House of Windsor (Saxe-Coburg and Gotha)
Edward VII; 1841–1910; King of the United Kingdom r. 1901–1910
George V 1865–1936; King of the United Kingdom r. 1910–1936
Edward VIII; 1894–1972; King of the United Kingdom r. 1936	George VI; 1895–1952; King of the United Kingdom r. 1936–1952
Elizabeth II; 1926–2022; Queen of the United Kingdom r. 1952–2022
Charles III b. 1948; King of the United Kingdom r. 2022–present

== See also ==
- Family tree of English monarchs (more detailed)
- Family tree of the British royal family (more detailed)
- Lists of monarchs in the British Isles
