= Eterscél mac Áeda =

Eterscél mac Áeda (died 778) was a king of the Uí Cheinnselaig of South Leinster. He was of the Sil Chormaic sept and was the son of Áed mac Colggen (died 738), considered to be King of all Leinster. His uncle Sechnassach mac Colggen (died 746/747) had also been a King of Uí Cheinnselaig. He ruled from 770 to 778.

The Uí Cheinnselaig were involved in infighting in this period. Eterscél obtained the throne in 770 by defeating in battle his predecessor Cennselach mac Brain of the Sil Máeluidir sept, who was slain.
