= Cellach Tosach mac Donngaile =

Cellach Tosach mac Donngaile (died 809) was a king of the Uí Cheinnselaig of South Leinster. He belonged to the Sil Chormaic sept of this branch of the Laigin and specifically to a branch which took over leadership of the Uí Dróna -the baronies of Idrone in modern County Carlow. He was the son of Donngal mac Laidcnén (died 761) and succeeded his uncle Cairpre mac Laidcnén (died 793). He ruled from 793 to 809.

The Uí Dróna had been the dominant sept in Uí Cheinnselaig for much of the last half of the 8th century. In 809 civil strife broke out among the Uí Cheinnselaig and Cellach was slain. He is called king of Ráith Étain (near Leighlinbridge, County Carlow), the seat of his sept. The Sil Máeluidir sept now took the throne.
