= Cennselach mac Brain =

Cennselach mac Brain (died 770) was a king of the Uí Cheinnselaig of South Leinster. He was of the Sil Máeluidir sept of this branch of the Laigin, who were found in the later baronies of Shelmalier on the lower reaches of the Slaney River in southern modern County Wexford. He was the son of Bran Ua Máele Dúin (died 712), a previous king. He ruled from 769 to 770.

The Uí Cheinnselaig were involved in infighting at this time. The Sil Máeluidir sept had not held the throne since 727. In 769, Cennselach defeated his predecessor Dub Calgaid mac Laidcnén, who was slain, at the Battle of Ferns. Cennselach, himself, was defeated and slain in battle in 770 by his successor Eterscél mac Áeda (died 778).
