= Dúnchad mac Murchada =

King of Leinster 727-728

Dúnchad mac Murchada (died 728) was a King of Leinster from the Uí Dúnlainge branch of the Laigin. He was the son of Murchad mac Brain Mut (died 727), the previous king. He ruled from 727 to 728.

== Biography ==
Dunchad participated in his father's great victory over the Ui Neill and the high king Fergal mac Máele Dúin (died 722) of the Cenél nEógain at the Battle of Allen in 722. Dunchad succeeded his father as king in 727. He defeated his Uí Cheinnselaig rival Laidcnén mac Con Mella who was slain at the Battle of Maistiu (Mullaghmast, south Co.Kildare) in 727. The next year in 728, however he was defeated and slain by his brother Fáelán mac Murchado (died 738) at the Battle of Ailenn (Co.Kildare) who took the kingship and his widow.

Dunchad was married to Taileflaith ingen Cathail, the daughter of Cathal mac Finguine (died 742), the King of Munster. He was ancestor of the Uí Dúnchada sept of the Ui Dunlainge with their royal seat at Líamhain (Lyons Hill, on the Dublin-Kildare border). His son Cellach mac Dúnchada (died 776) was a king of Leinster.

== See also ==
- Kings of Leinster
