= Sechnassach mac Colggen =

Irish regional king

Sechnassach mac Colggen (died 746/747) was a king of the Uí Cheinnselaig of South Leinster or Laigin Desgabair. He was of the Sil Chormaic sept of this branch of the Laigin. His father Colcú mac Bressail (died 722) was called king of Ard Ladrann (near Gorey in County Wexford) at his death obit in the annals in 722 which mention that he was killed. Sechnassach was the great-great grandson of Crundmáel Erbuilc (died 655), a King of Leinster and brother of Áed mac Colggen (died 738), also King of Leinster.

His brother had been slain at the Battle of Áth Senaig in 738 by the high king Áed Allán. After the crushing defeat at Áth Senaig, the Uí Dúnlainge dominated the kingship of Leinster for fully three centuries. He succeeded his brother as king and ruled from 738-746/ 747. Nothing is recorded of him in the annals other than his death. His nephew Eterscél mac Áeda (died 778) was also a King of the Uí Cheinnselaig.
