= List of office-holders of the United Kingdom and predecessor states =

Overview of current and former British office-holders

This is a list of rulers and office-holders of the United Kingdom of Great Britain and Northern Ireland and predecessor states.

== Heads of state ==
- List of English monarchs
- List of Scottish monarchs
- List of rulers of Wales
- List of British monarchs

== Heads of government ==
- Prime Minister of the United Kingdom (1721–present)
  - List of prime ministers of the United Kingdom

== Ministers ==
- Cabinet of the United Kingdom
- Chancellor of the Exchequer (1559–present)
- Secretary of State for Northern Ireland (1972–present)
- Secretary of State for Foreign and Commonwealth Affairs (1968–present)
- Secretary of State for the Colonies (1768–1782; 1794–1801; 1854–1966)
- Secretary of State for India (1858–1947)
- Secretary of State for the Southern Department (1660–1782)
- Secretary of State for the Northern Department (1660–1782)
- Secretary of State for the Home Department (1782–present)
- Secretary of State for Foreign Affairs (1782–1968)
- Secretary of State for War (1794–1801; 1854–1964)
- Secretary of State for War and the Colonies (1801–1854)
- Secretary of State for Air (1918–1964)
- Secretary of State for Defence (1964–present)
- Secretary of State for Dominion Affairs (1925–1947)
- Secretary of State for Commonwealth Relations (1947–1966)
- Secretary of State for Commonwealth Affairs (1966–1968)
- Secretary of State for Scotland (1926–present)
- Secretary of State for Wales (1964–present)
- Secretary of State for Economic Affairs (1964–1969)
- Secretary of State for International Development (1970–1979, 1997–2020)
- Secretary of State for Work and Pensions (1970–present)
- Secretary of State for Education and Skills (and preceding positions, 1902–present)
- Secretary of State for Employment (and preceding positions, 1916–present)
- Secretary of State for Transport (and preceding positions, 1924–present)
- Secretary of State for Culture, Media and Sport (and preceding positions, 1992–present)
- Secretary of State for Northern Ireland (1972–present)
- Secretary of State for the Environment (1970–1997)
- Secretary of State for the Environment, Transport and the Regions (1997–2001)
- Secretary of State for Environment, Food and Rural Affairs (2001–present)
- Secretary of State for Exiting the European Union (2016–2020)
- Lord Chancellor (1068–present)
- Lord President of the Council (1678–present)
- Lord Keeper of the Privy Seal (1307–present)
- Minister of Agriculture, Fisheries and Food (and preceding positions, 1889–2001)
- Minister of Technology (1964–1970)
- First Lord of the Admiralty (1709–1964)
- Paymaster General (1834–present)
- Master-General of the Ordnance (1544–1855)
- President of the Board of Trade (1696–1782; 1784–present)
- Chancellor of the Duchy of Lancaster (1413–present)
- Postmaster General (1823–1968)
- Paymaster of the Forces (1661–1836)
- Master-General of the Ordnance (1544–1855)
- Master of the Mint (1572–1869)
- Treasurer of the Navy (1544–1836)
- Secretary at War (1661–1863)
- First Commissioner of Woods and Forests (1810–1851)
- First Commissioner of Works (1851–1937)
- President of the Poor Law Board (1834–1871)
- President of the Local Government Board (1871–1919)
- Secretary for Scotland (1885–1926)
- HM Treasury
- Lord treasurers (1126–1714)
- First Lord of the Treasury (1714–1905)
- Commissioners of the Treasury (1714–present)

== Parliament office-holders ==
- Leader of the House of Commons (1721–present)
- Members of Parliament elected in 2001
- Members of Parliament elected in 2005
- Members of Parliament elected in 2010
- Members of the House of Lords

== State office-holders ==
=== Great Officers of State ===
- Lord High Steward
- Lord High Constable
- Lord Great Chamberlain
- Earl Marshal
- Keeper of the Great Seal of Scotland
- Keeper of the Privy Seal of Scotland
- Lord Clerk Register
- Lord Lyon King of Arms

=== Officers of the Royal Household ===
- Lord Steward
- Lord Chamberlain
- Historiographer Royal
- Astronomer Royal for Scotland
- Sculptor in Ordinary for Scotland
- HM Painter and Limner for Scotland
- Her Majesty's Botanist

=== Legal officers ===
- Attorney General for England and Wales
- Solicitor General for England and Wales
- Lord Advocate
- Solicitor General for Scotland
- Advocate General for Scotland
- Counsel General for Wales
- Attorney General for Northern Ireland

== Court office-holders ==
- Lord Chief Justice
- Master of the Rolls
- Chief Justice of the Court of Common Pleas (to 1873)
- Chief Baron of the Exchequer (to 1873)
- Lord Justice General
- Lord Justice Clerk
- Lords justice of appeal of England and Wales
- Lords justice of appeal of Northern Ireland
- Senators of the College of Justice

== Heads of devolved governments ==
=== Northern Ireland ===
- Lord Lieutenant of Ireland (1171–1922)
- Governor of Northern Ireland (1922–1972) (Abolished under the Northern Ireland Constitution Act 1973)
- Prime Minister of Northern Ireland (1922–1972)
- Secretaries of state for Northern Ireland (1972– 1998, 2002–2007)
- First Minister and Deputy First Minister [1998–2002, 2007–present]
- Members of the Northern Ireland Assembly [1998–2002, 2007–present]

=== Scotland ===
- Members of the Scottish Parliament
- First Minister of Scotland
- List of Scottish governments

=== Wales ===
- Members of the Senedd
- Welsh Government
- First Minister for Wales

== Heads of colonies and overseas territories ==
- British Crown dependencies
- Overseas territories of the United Kingdom

=== Crown dependencies ===
==== Isle of Man ====
- King of Mann
- Lord of Mann
- Governor of the Isle of Man
- Lieutenant Governor of the Isle of Man

==== Channel Islands ====
- Guernsey: Bailiffs of Guernsey
- Jersey: Bailiffs of Jersey
- Sark: Seigneurs of Sark

=== Overseas territories ===
==== Anguilla ====
- Governors of Anguilla

==== Bermuda ====
- Governors of Bermuda

==== British Antarctic Territory ====
- Commissioners of the British Antarctic Territory

==== British Virgin Islands ====
- Colonial governors of the British Virgin Islands
- Presidents of the British Virgin Islands
- Governors of the British Virgin Islands

==== Cayman Islands ====
- Governors of the Cayman Islands

==== Falkland Islands ====
- Governors of the Falkland Islands

==== Gibraltar ====
- Governors of Gibraltar
- Chief ministers of Gibraltar

==== Montserrat ====
- Governors of Montserrat

==== Pitcairn Islands ====
- Rulers of the Pitcairn Islands
- Governors of Fiji
- High commissioners from the United Kingdom to New Zealand

==== Saint Helena ====
- Governors of Saint Helena

==== Turks and Caicos Islands ====
- Governors of the Turks and Caicos Islands

== Nobility ==
- Duke of Devonshire
- Tenants of Herm
- Duke of Norfolk
- Seigneurs of Sark
- Tenants of Brecqhou
- Rulers of Wales
- Prince of Wales
- Duke of York

== Mayors ==
- Heads of London government
  - List of lord mayors of London

== Heads of former states ==
- Roman governors of Britannia
- Historical Kings of the Britons
- Bretwalda (Overlord of the English kingdoms)
- Kings of East Anglia
- Kings of Essex
- Kings of Hwicce
- Kings of Kent
- Kings of Lindsey
- Kings of Mercia
- Kings of Northumbria
- Kings of Sussex
- Kings of Wessex
- Kings of Jorvik
- Earls of York
- Earls of Northumbria
- Kings of Dál Riata
- Kings of the Picts
- Lords of Galloway
- Rulers of Wales
- Kings of Gwynedd
- Kings of the Isle of Man and the Isles
- Kings of the Isle of Man

== See also ==
- List of current heads of government in the United Kingdom and dependencies
- United Kingdom order of precedence
