= Donngal mac Laidcnén =

Donngal mac Laidcnén (died 761) was a king of the Uí Cheinnselaig of South Leinster. He belonged to the Sil Chormaic sept of this branch of the Laigin and specifically to a branch which took over leadership of the Uí Dróna -the baronies of Idrone in modern County Carlow. His last paternal ancestor to hold the throne was his great great grandfather Crundmáel Erbuilc (died 655) He ruled from 758 to 761.

Donngal faced an attack by the Osraige under their king Anmchad mac Con Cherca. He suffered an initial defeat at Gowran in 759. In 761 Donngal was defeated and slain at the Battle of Belach Gabraín (pass of Gowran in east-central Osraige) versus the Osraige. He was succeeded by his brother Dub Calgaid mac Laidcnén (died 769).

His son Cellach Tosach mac Donngaile (died 809) was also a King of Uí Cheinnselaig.
