= Bran ua Máele Dúin =

Bran ua Máele Dúin (or Bran mac Dúnchada) (died 712) was a king of the Uí Cheinnselaig of South Leinster. He was of the Sil Máeluidir sept of this branch of the Laigin, who were found in the later baronies of Shelmalier on the lower reaches of the Slaney River in southern modern County Wexford. The date of Bran's accession is unknown but the Book of Leinster king list gives him a reign of three years which would correspond to 709–712.

His last paternal ancestor to hold the kingship was Éogan Cáech mac Nath Í who would have lived in the early 6th century of whom Bran was a 5th generation descendant. Bran's grandfather Máel Dúin mac Máel Uidir was the son of the eponymous founder of his sept. The last member of this sept to hold the throne was Forannán mac Máel Udir whom the king lists would place in the late 6th century.

The Annals of Ulster record that in 709 the Uí Cheinnselaig fought the Battle of Selg in Fortuatha Laigen (east of the Wicklow Mountains) against Cellach Cualann, King of Leinster of the Uí Máil branch of the Laigin in which two sons of Cellach were slain. The Annals of Tigernach are however silent on who Cellach's opponents were and mention that he had British mercenaries. The Uí Cheinnselaig were probably the aggressors and the battle may have actually been a standoff despite Cellach's losses.

The Uí Cheinnselaig however became involved in infighting and in 712 Bran lost his life along with his sons in battle. The Book of Leinster calls this battle the Battle of Áth Buichet. One of Bran's sons did survive, Cennselach mac Brain (died 770) who later became king of the Uí Cheinnselaig.
