= Dub Calgaid mac Laidcnén =

Dub Calgaid mac Laidcnén (died 769) was a king of the Uí Cheinnselaig of South Leinster. He belonged to the Sil Chormaic sept of this branch of the Laigin and specifically to a branch which took over leadership of the Uí Dróna -the baronies of Idrone in modern County Carlow. His last paternal ancestor to hold the throne was his great-great-grandfather Crundmáel Erbuilc (died 655) He was the brother of Donngal mac Laidcnén (died 761). He ruled from 761 to 769.

The Uí Cheinnselaig became involved in a period of infighting and in 769 Dub Calgaid was defeated and slain at the Battle of Ferns by his successor Cennselach mac Brain (died 770) of the Sil Máeluidir sept.
