= Laidcnén mac Con Mella =

Laidcnén mac Con Mella (died 727) was a king of the Uí Cheinnselaig of South Leinster. He was of the Sil Máeluidir sept of this branch of the Laigin, who were found in the later baronies of Shelmalier on the lower reaches of the Slaney River in southern modern County Wexford.

His last paternal ancestor to hold the kingship was Éogan Cáech mac Nath Í who would have lived in the early 6th century of whom Laidcnén was a 5th generation descendant. Laidcnén was the great grandson of Máel Odor mac Guairi, the eponymous founder of his sept.

According to the king lists in the Book of Leinster, Laidcnén succeeded his brother Cú Chongelt mac Con Mella as king and ruled for 10 years. This would give his regnal years as 717–727. However, the historian Mac Niocaill associates his brother with the death obit of a certain Cú Chongelt in 724 in the Annals of Ulster.

He was defeated by his northern rival and King of Leinster, Dúnchad mac Murchado (died 728) of the Uí Dúnlainge, at the Battle of Maistiu (Mullaghmast, south Co.Kildare) in 727 and was slain therein. the Annals of Ulster refer to it as a battle between the two Laigin.
