= St Bees =

Village in Cumbria, England

Coordinates: 54.492°N 3.590°W

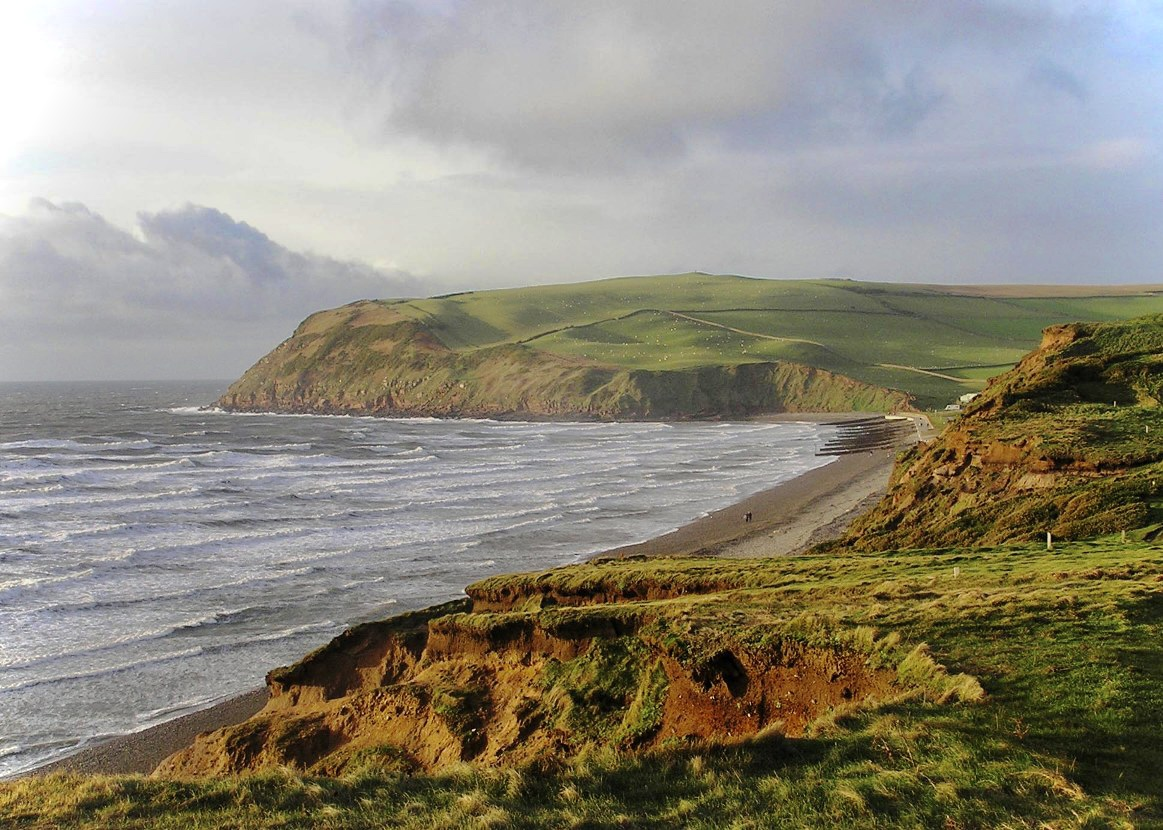
- St Bees Head

- Location in Copeland Borough Location within Cumbria
- Population: 1,801 (2011)
- OS grid reference: NX971115
- Civil parish: St Bees
- Unitary authority: Cumberland
- Ceremonial county: Cumbria
- Region: North West
- Country: England
- Sovereign state: United Kingdom
- Post town: ST. BEES
- Postcode district: CA27
- Dialling code: 01946
- Police: Cumbria
- Fire: Cumbria
- Ambulance: North West
- UK Parliament: Whitehaven and Workington

St Bees is a coastal village, civil parish and electoral ward in the Cumberland district of Cumbria, England, on the Irish Sea.

Within the parish is St Bees Head which is the only Heritage Coast between Wales and Scotland and a Site of Special Scientific Interest. The Headland is also an RSPB bird reserve which is the only cliff-nesting seabird colony in north-west England. St Bees Lighthouse stands on the North Head which is the most westerly point of Northern England.

St Bees is a popular holiday destination due to the coastline and proximity to the Western Lake District. In the village there is St Bees Priory dating from 1120, and St Bees School founded in 1583. The Wainwright Coast to Coast Walk starts from St Bees and the National Trail, the England Coast Path, runs along the coast. It has a railway station served by the Cumbrian Coast Line.

== Early history ==
Evidence of Mesolithic and Bronze Age habitation has been found in St Bees, but nothing of the Roman occupation, even though St Bees Head would have been a prominent observation point. The name St Bees is a corruption of the Norse name for the village, which is given in the earliest charter of the Priory as "Kyrkeby becok", which can be translated as the "Church town of Bega", relating to the local Saint Bega. She was said to be an Irish princess who fled across the Irish Sea in the ninth century to St Bees to avoid an enforced marriage. Carved stones at the priory show that Irish-Norse Vikings settled here in the tenth century.

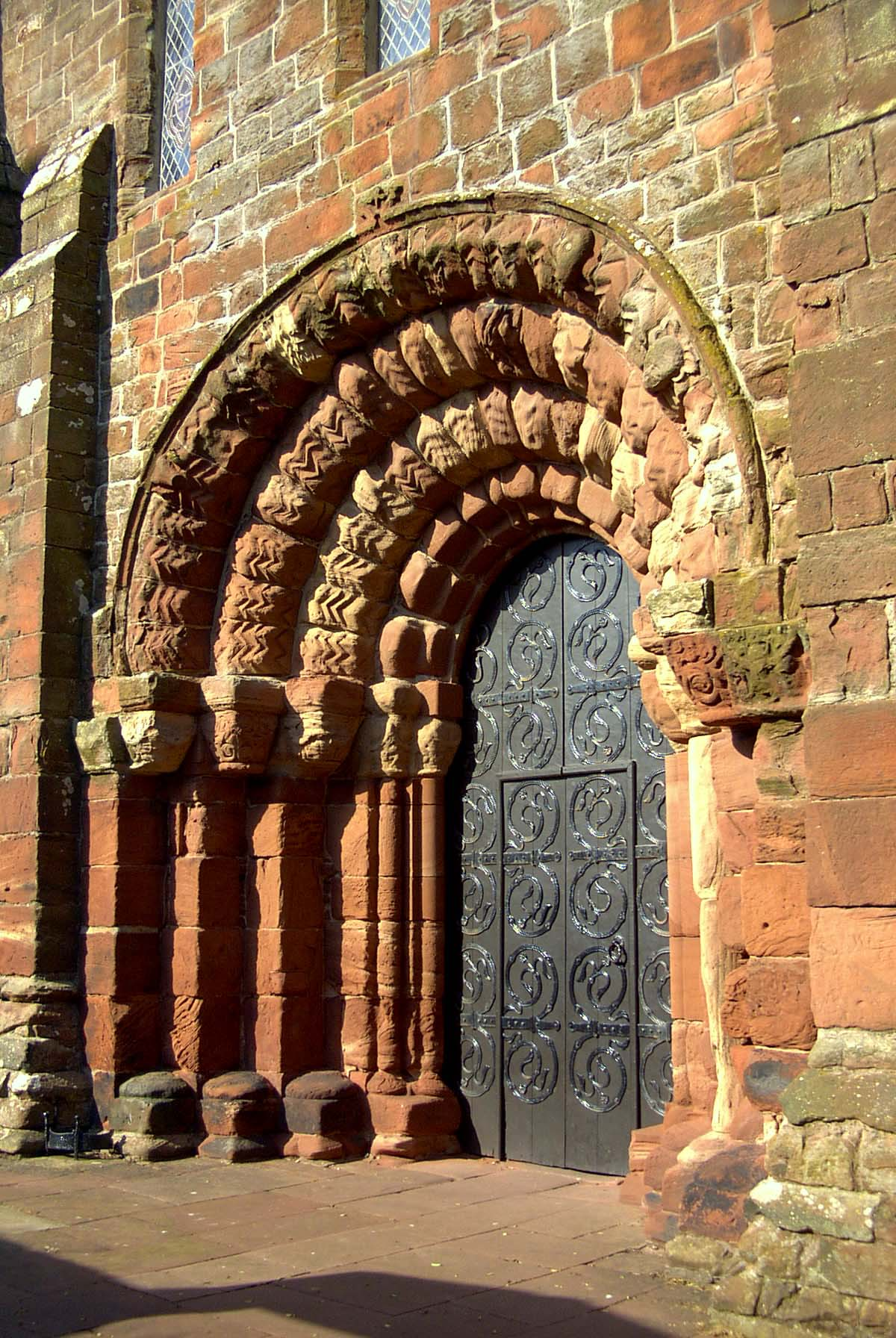
St Bees Priory: The Norman west door

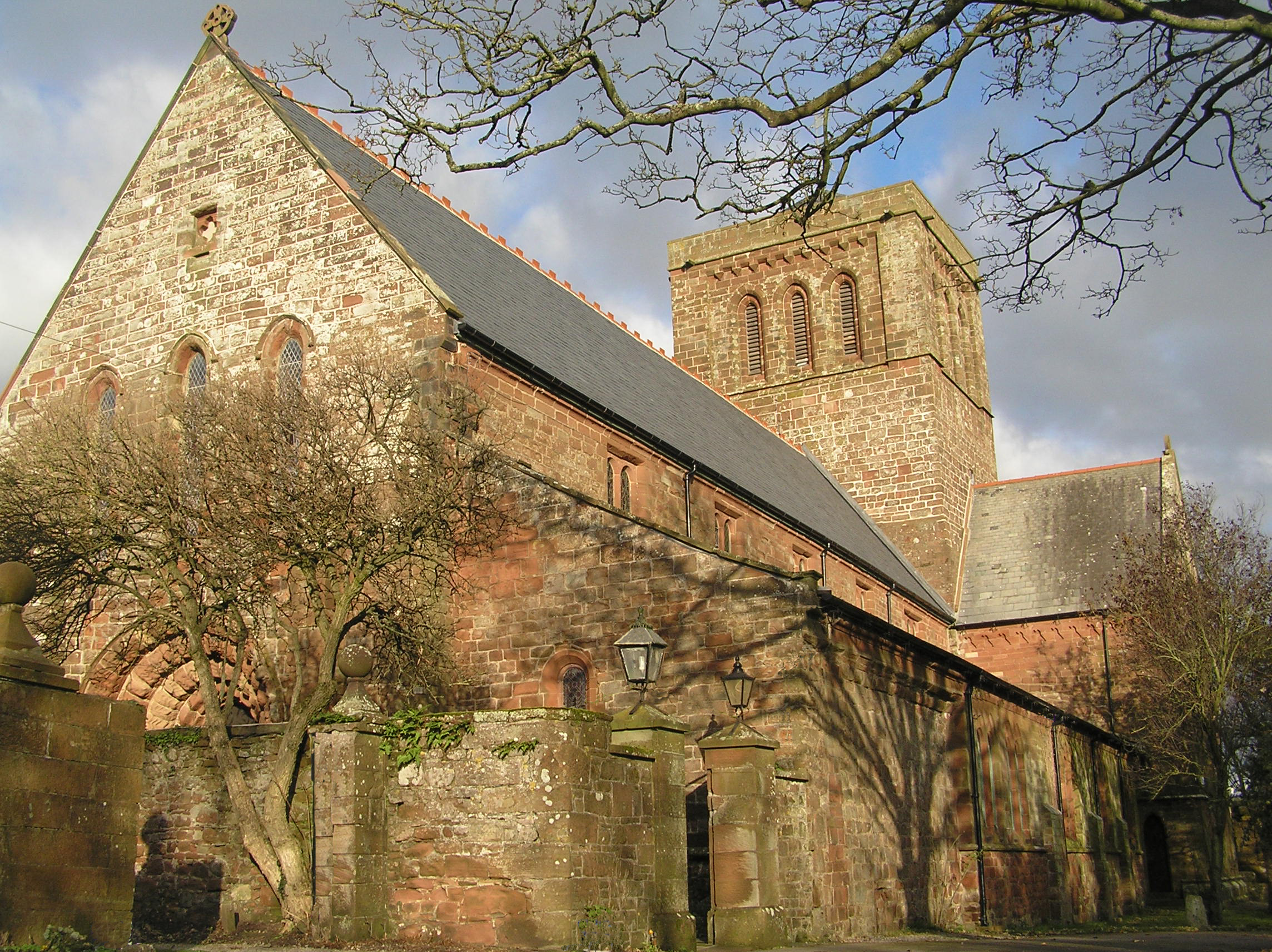
St Bees Priory

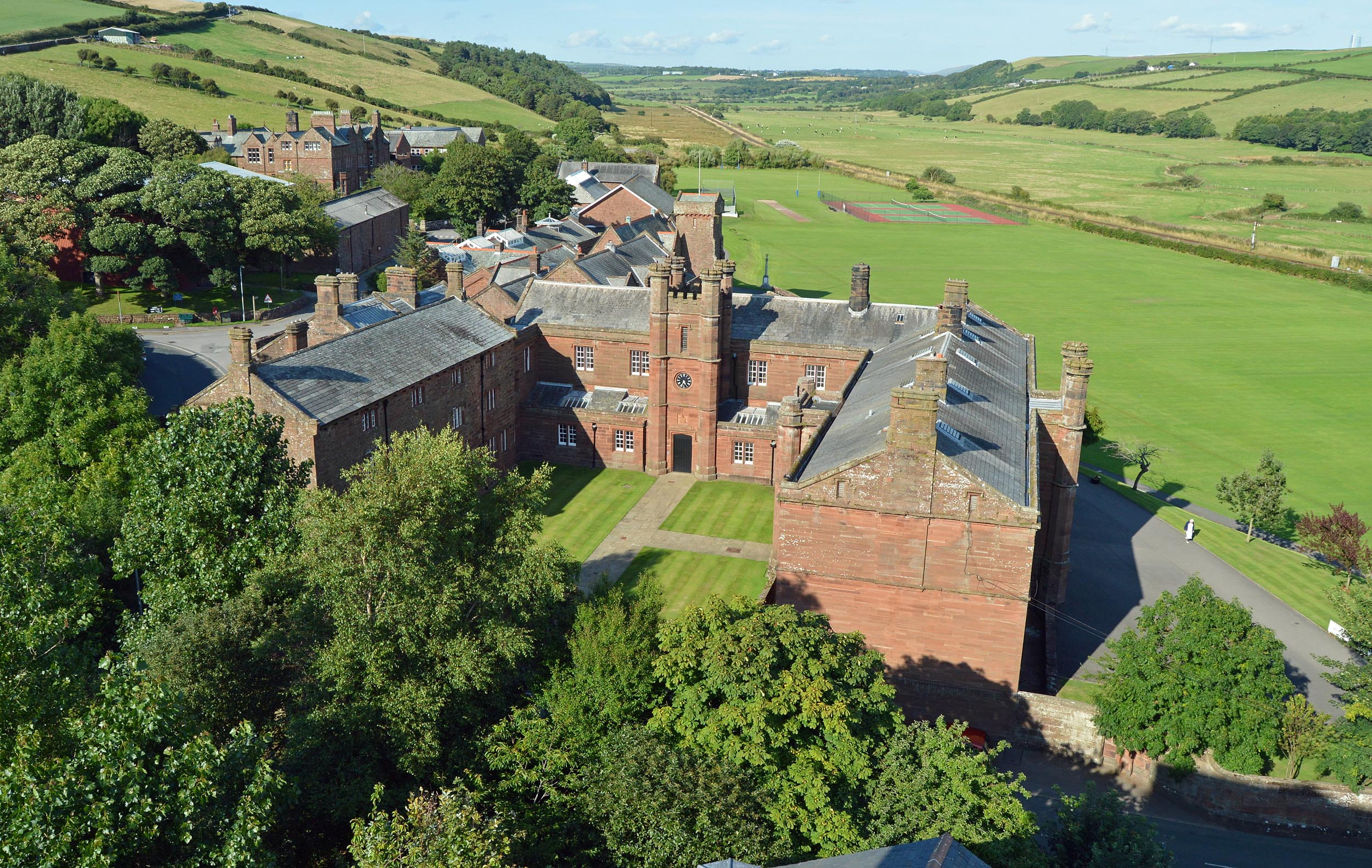
St Bees School

The Normans did not reach Cumberland until 1092, and when they took over the local lordships, William Meschin, Lord of Egremont, used the existing religious site to found a Benedictine priory for a prior and six monks sometime between 1120 and 1135. The priory was subordinate to the great Benedictine monastery of St Mary at York. The magnificent Norman doorway of the priory dates from just after this time; probably about 1150.

The priory had a great influence on the area. The monks worked the land, fished, and extended the priory buildings. The ecclesiastical parish of St Bees was large and stretched to Ennerdale, Loweswater, Wasdale and Eskdale. The coffin routes from these outlying areas to the mother church in St Bees can still be followed in places.

The priory was closed during the Dissolution of the Monasteries on the orders of Henry VIII in 1539. The nave and transepts of the monastic church have continued in use as the parish church to the present day, but much of the extensive monastic buildings were plundered or fell into decay.

Remarkably, the small village of St Bees produced two of the archbishops of the reign of Queen Elizabeth I: Edmund Grindal, Archbishop of Canterbury and Edwin Sandys; Archbishop of York.

In about 1519 Edmund Grindal was born in Cross Hill House, St Bees, which still exists, and is marked with a plaque. He was probably educated at the priory across the valley. A devout Protestant, he made his mark in the reign of Edward VI, but had to flee to Strasbourg when the Catholic Mary I ascended the throne. On Mary's death the country once again became Protestant, and Grindal became Bishop of London, Archbishop of York and then Archbishop of Canterbury. His undoing was opposing Queen Elizabeth I on liberal religious meetings and he was suspended. He died in 1583 still in disgrace, but, virtually on his death bed, he founded St Bees School. The primary school in the village was established in the 1870s.

== Modern growth ==
The site of the priory is an area of firm ground higher than the peat beds that fill the valley, and due to the absence of level ground it is logical that the original settlement would grow up there. However the area was constricted, and as the village expanded it grew up on the opposite side of the valley. The oldest existing house dates from the early 16th century and the present Main Street was based on a string of farms and farmworkers' dwellings.

The 19th century saw the start of great changes. In 1816 St Bees Theological College was founded, and proved popular as it was first for the training of Church of England clergy outside Oxford and Cambridge. To house the college, the monastic chancel of the Priory was re-roofed and served as the main lecture room, and additional lecture rooms were built in the 1860s. At one time the college had 100 students, and over 2,600 clergy were trained before it closed in 1895.

St Bees School embarked on an era of rapid expansion starting with the construction of the quadrangle in 1846 using compensation from the rich mine-owning Lowther family. They had illegally obtained the lucrative mineral rights for Whitehaven from the School in 1742 at a derisory sum. This was the first step in St. Bees School's rise from a local institution to becoming one of the new "public schools" on the fashionable model of Dr Arnold's Rugby School. By 1916 numbers had reached 350, many new buildings had been erected, and the school had become known nationally. The school was forced to close in 2015 because of financial struggles but re-opened a couple of years later. The closure of the school made many teachers and members of the community to leave the village, such as Reverend Clifford Swartz, the former Vicar of the local Protestant church and chaplain of St Bees School.

Perhaps some of the greatest changes were after 1849 when the Furness Railway reached the village. St Bees attracted the professional classes which commuted to Whitehaven or Workington. This led to the building of many of the larger houses and Lonsdale Terrace. The railway brought tourists, and as early as 1851 the Lord Mayor of London stayed at the Seacote Hotel. This long history of attracting tourists for "bucket and spade" holidays has continued to this day.

The railway made possible the export of St Bees sandstone. Huge amounts of stone were quarried, much of it for building the boom town of Barrow-in-Furness. This industry died out in the 1970s, but has since been revived, and there are now two working quarries in the parish.

Agriculture was originally the mainstay of the village economy. Gradually, during the 19th century, service employment for the school and lodgings for the college gave additional income, and with the advent of commuters, the village's social mix was becoming more middle class. Tourism and quarries also provided employment, and many village men found work in the iron ore mines at Cleator. Thus the 19th century saw the change from a rural backwater based on agriculture, to the more diversified role of a dormitory village for professional and industrial worker alike, and its growth into a minor academic centre.

The start of the 20th century saw yet another decline in agriculture, and this has continued to today, when there are only a few farms left. Industrial decline also hit West Cumbria as a whole, particularly after the boom years of both world wars. However, following the Second World War, two major industries were established which have had a profound effect on the community. The former Marchon Chemical Company at Whitehaven, and UKAEA/BNFL at Sellafield both soaked up village labour released by the declining heavy iron and mining industries, and brought a large influx of the technical and scientific university-educated middle class into the village; rather like the first arrival of the professional classes a century earlier. There is now an extensive science park – Westlakes, on the northern fringe of the parish, at which the Nuclear Decommissioning Authority has its national headquarters.

The last two decades have seen a significant revival in tourism, boosted by the Coast to Coast walk and increasing recognition of the unique landscape of the St Bees Heritage Coast.

In 2014, it was rated one of the most attractive postcode areas to live in England.

== St Bees Man ==
In 1981 an archaeological excavation at the priory revealed a vault with a lead coffin containing an astonishingly well preserved body – now known as the St Bees Man. He has been identified as Anthony de Lucy, a knight, who died in 1368 in the Teutonic Crusades in Lithuania. Although the body was over six hundred years old, his nails, skin and stomach contents were found to be in near-perfect condition. After his death the vault was enlarged to take the body of his sister, Maud de Lucy, who died in 1398. Effigies of Maud and Anthony can be seen in an extensive history display which includes the shroud in which he was wrapped.

== Governance ==
St Bees is within the Whitehaven and Workington UK parliamentary constituency.

== Transport links ==
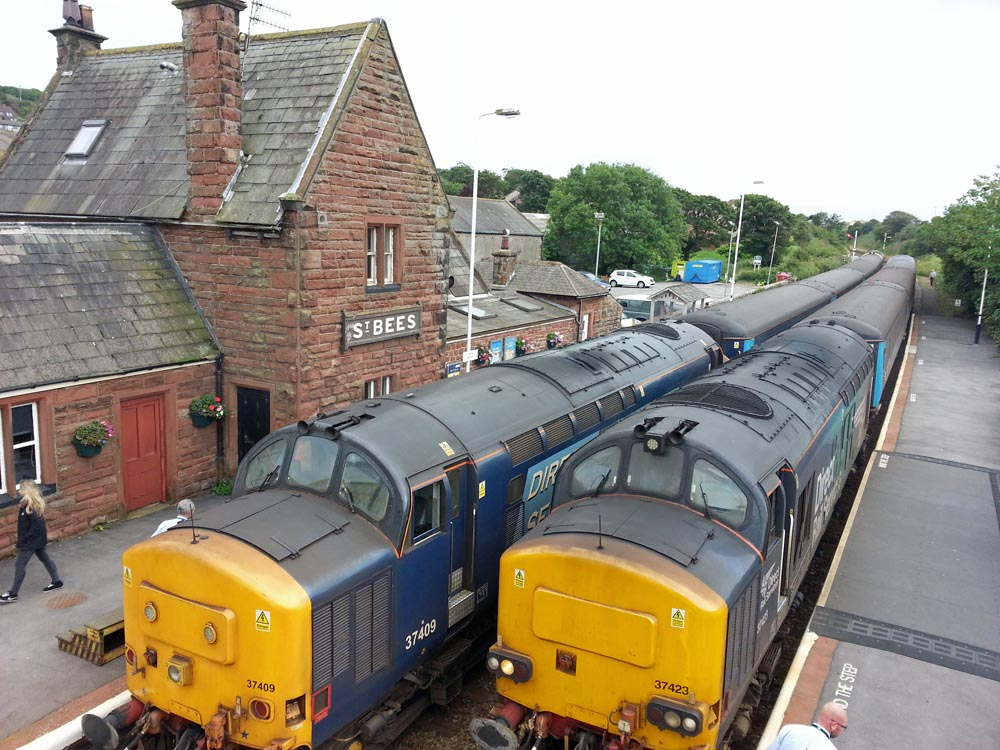
Two diesel passenger trains crossing at St Bees railway station

=== Train ===
The village is served by St Bees railway station on the Cumbrian Coast Line, with trains from Barrow-in-Furness, Lancaster, Preston and Carlisle. As from May 20, 2018, there are 30 stopping passenger trains Monday to Saturday, and 16 trains a day on Sundays.

=== Road ===
The village is on the B5345 from Whitehaven to Iron Bridge junction near Beckermet.

=== Bus ===
Stagecoach runs services to either to Ergemont or Whitehaven.

== Sport and recreation ==
The village has a football team which competes in the Cumbria County league.

There are facilities for rugby, football and cricket at the Adams recreation ground adjacent to the Seacote beach. This playing field was created in memory of Baron Adams of Ennerdale. The sports facilities of St Bees School are also available, which include a sports hall, squash, tennis and fives courts, and an indoor swimming pool.

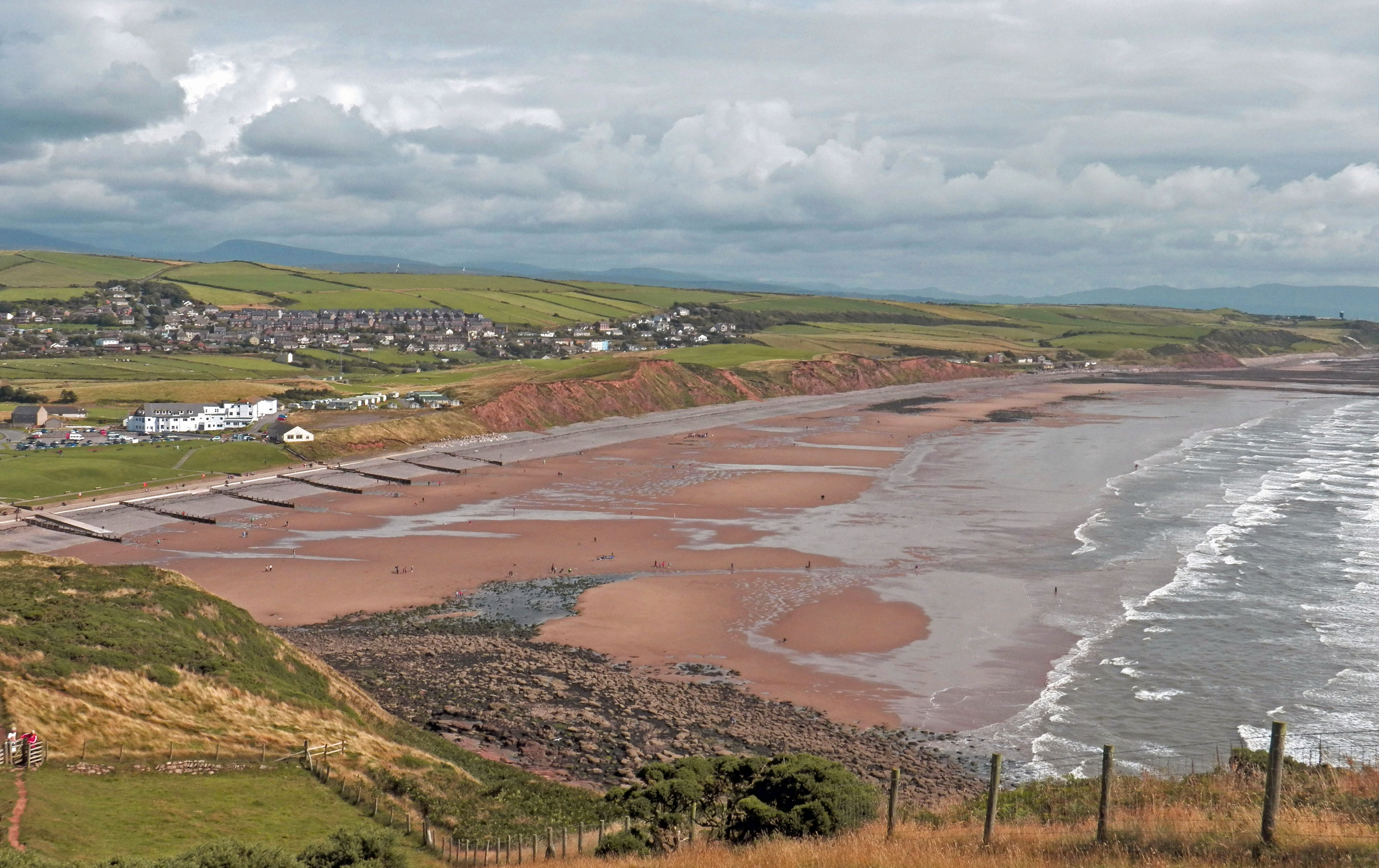
St Bees beach from the South Head

Coast-based recreational activities at St Bees are: windsurfing, kite-surfing, rock climbing, bouldering, swimming, jet-skiing, water-skiing, canoeing and para-gliding. These are undertaken on St Bees Head and off the large sandy surf beach.

The circular walk to St Bees Head and Birkhams quarry featured in the May 2012 booklet of the best coastal walks in UK published by the Daily Telegraph newspaper; it being one of only two walks covered in the north west of England.

== Wainwright Coast to Coast walk ==
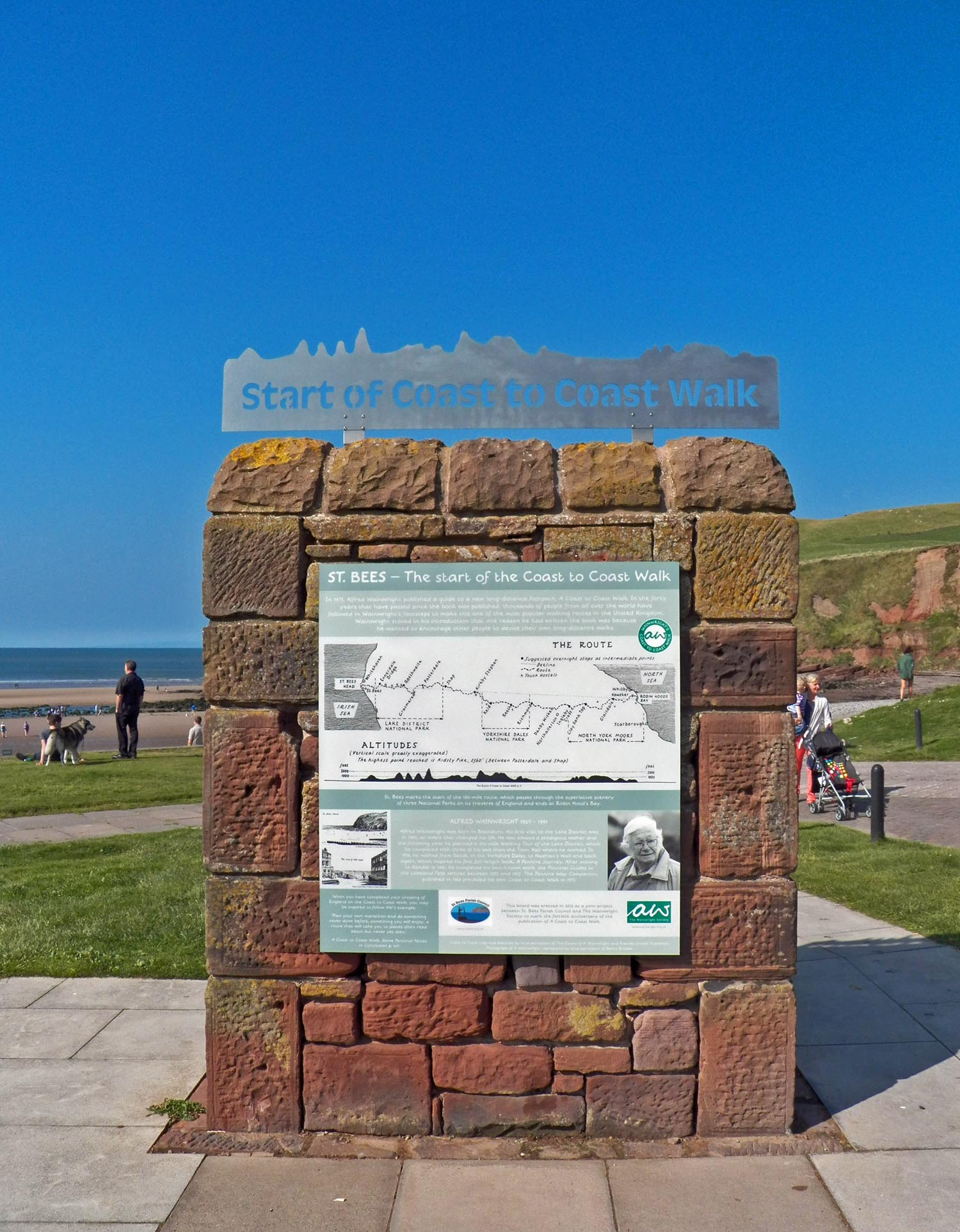
Start of the Coast to Coast Walk at the beach at St Bees

St Bees is the start of the Wainwright Coast to Coast Walk, which was devised by Alfred Wainwright in 1973. It is an 192-mile (309 km) long-distance footpath in Northern England which is now being made a National Trail.

As planned by Alfred Wainwright, it passes through three contrasting National Parks: the Lake District National Park, the Yorkshire Dales National Park, and the North York Moors National Park. Wainwright recommended that walkers dip their booted feet in the Irish Sea at St Bees and, at the end of the walk, in the North Sea at Robin Hood's Bay. At St Bees, the start is marked by the "Wainwright Wall" which explains the walk and its history. A new interpretation board was installed in 2013 by the Wainwright Society, and opened by Eric Robson. The steel banner representing the gradient profile was installed in 2014 by St Bees Parish Council.

== Gallery ==
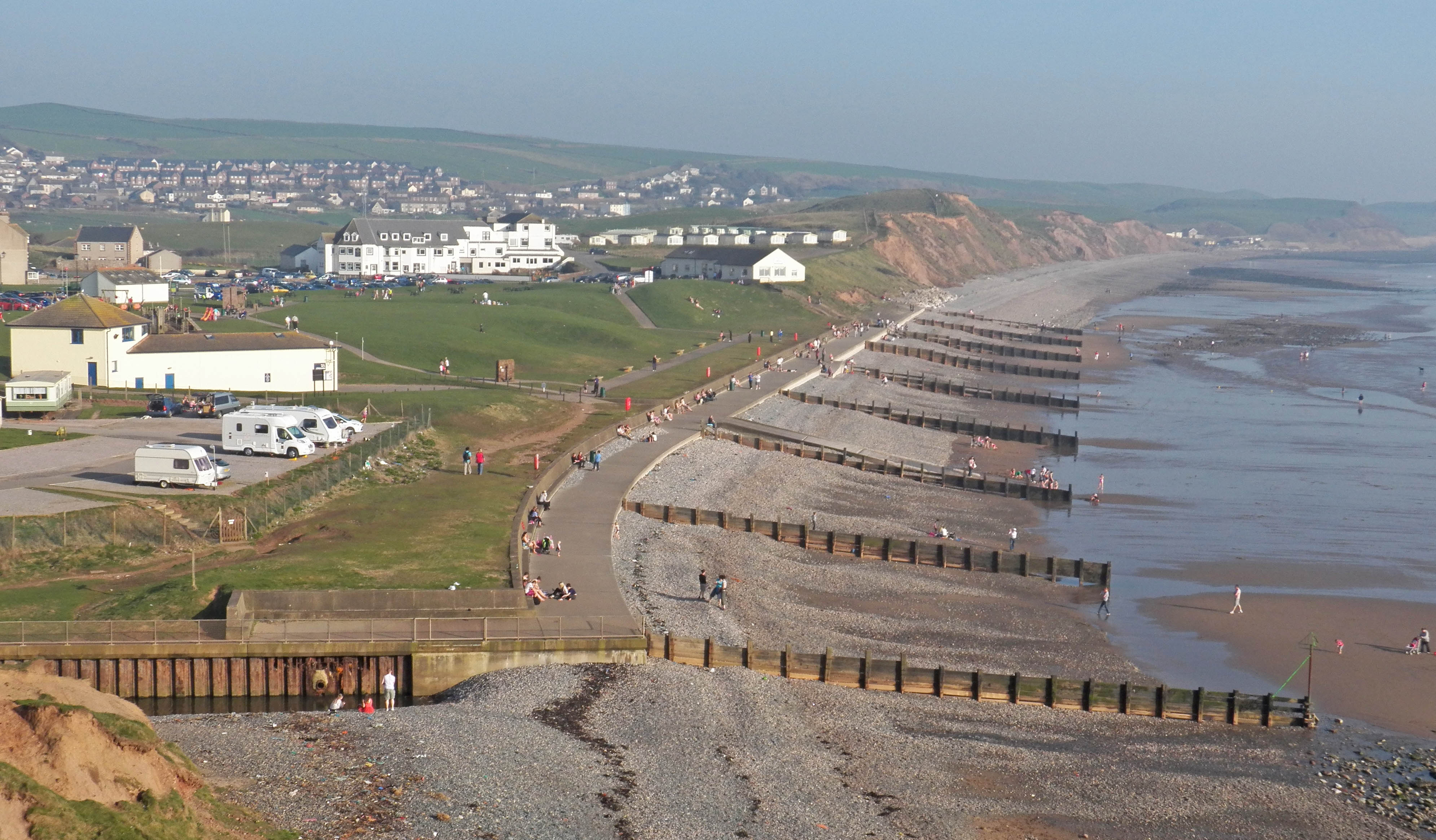
St Bees promenade and bay looking south

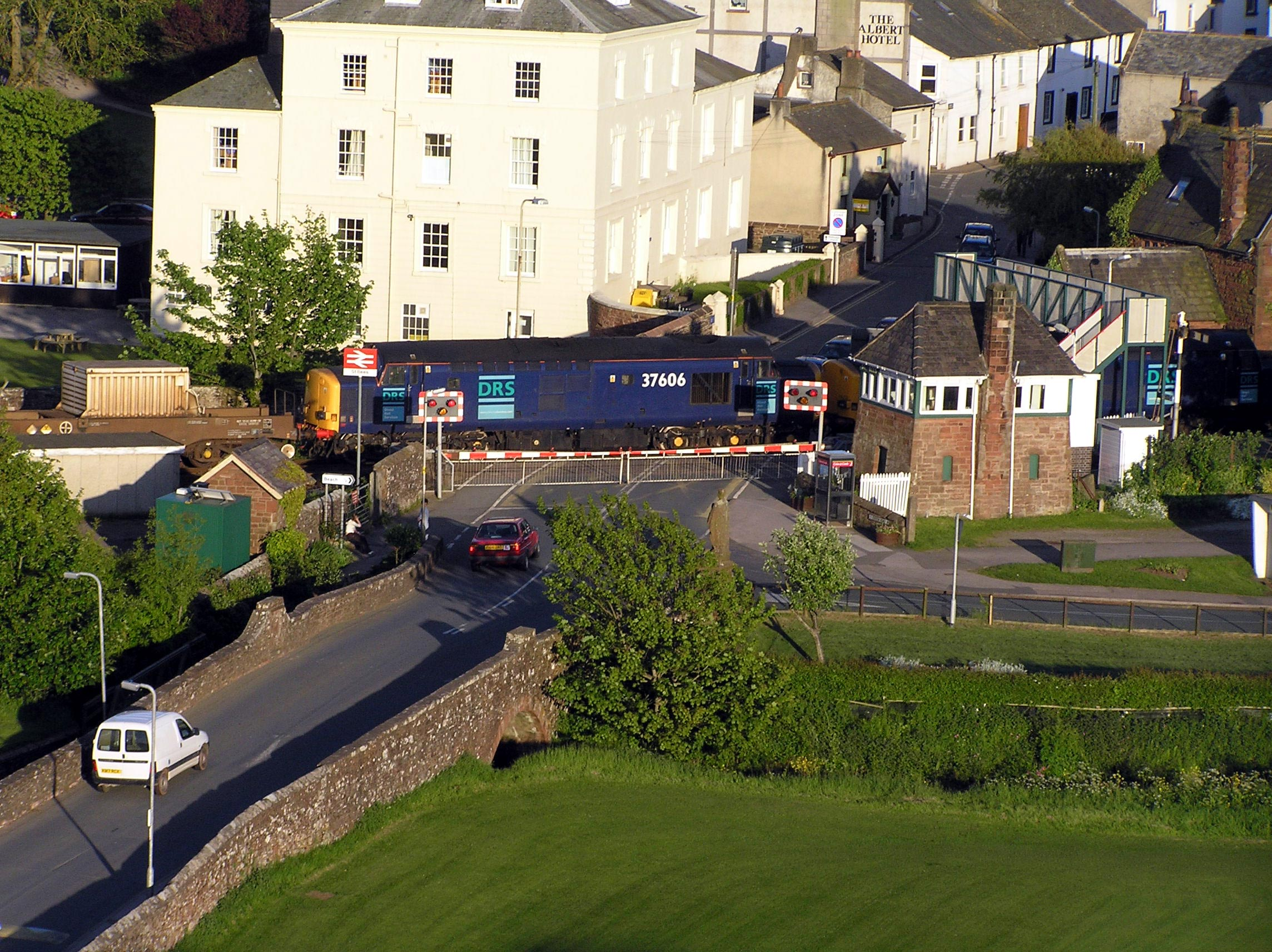
St Bees: 19th-century railway station and 16th-century road bridge

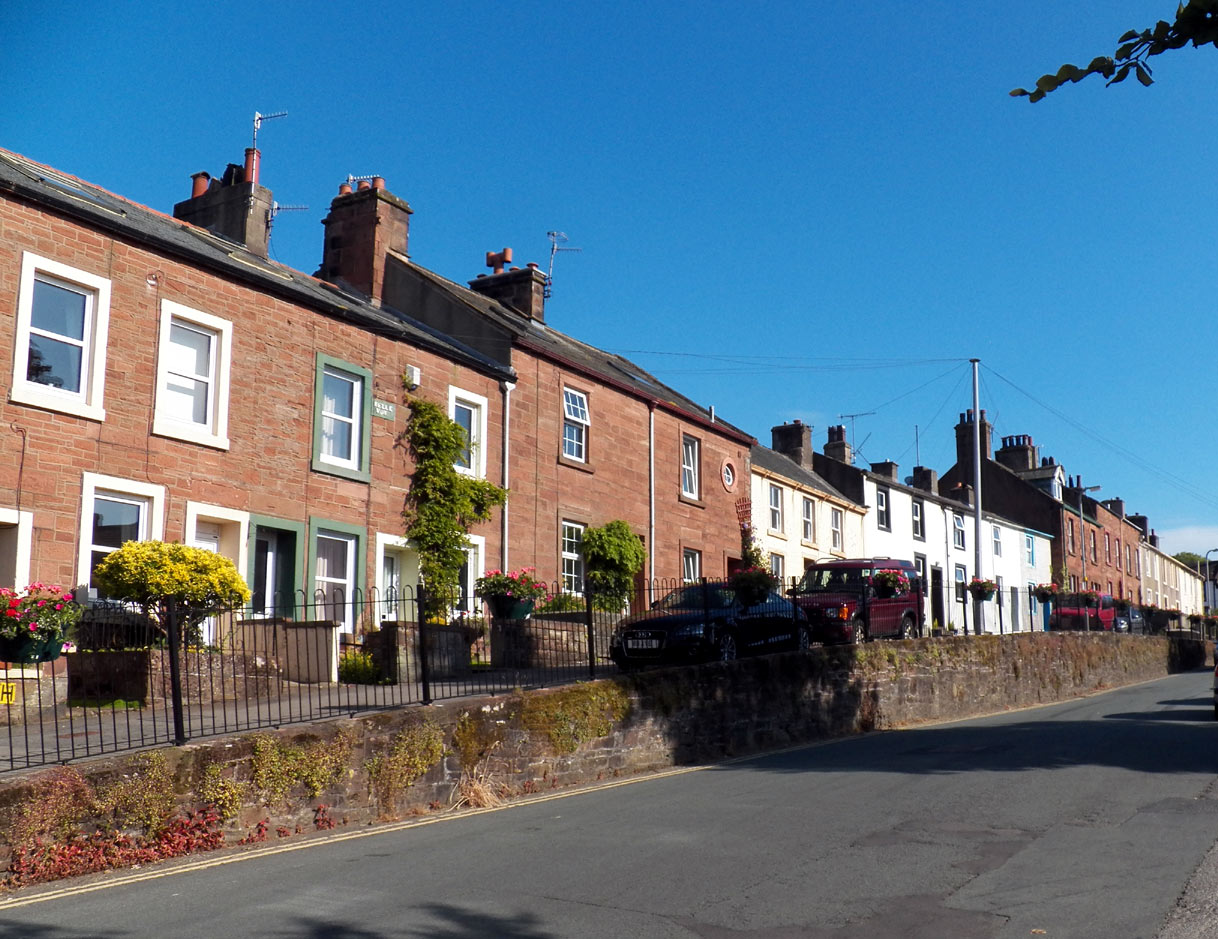
Mid Main Street

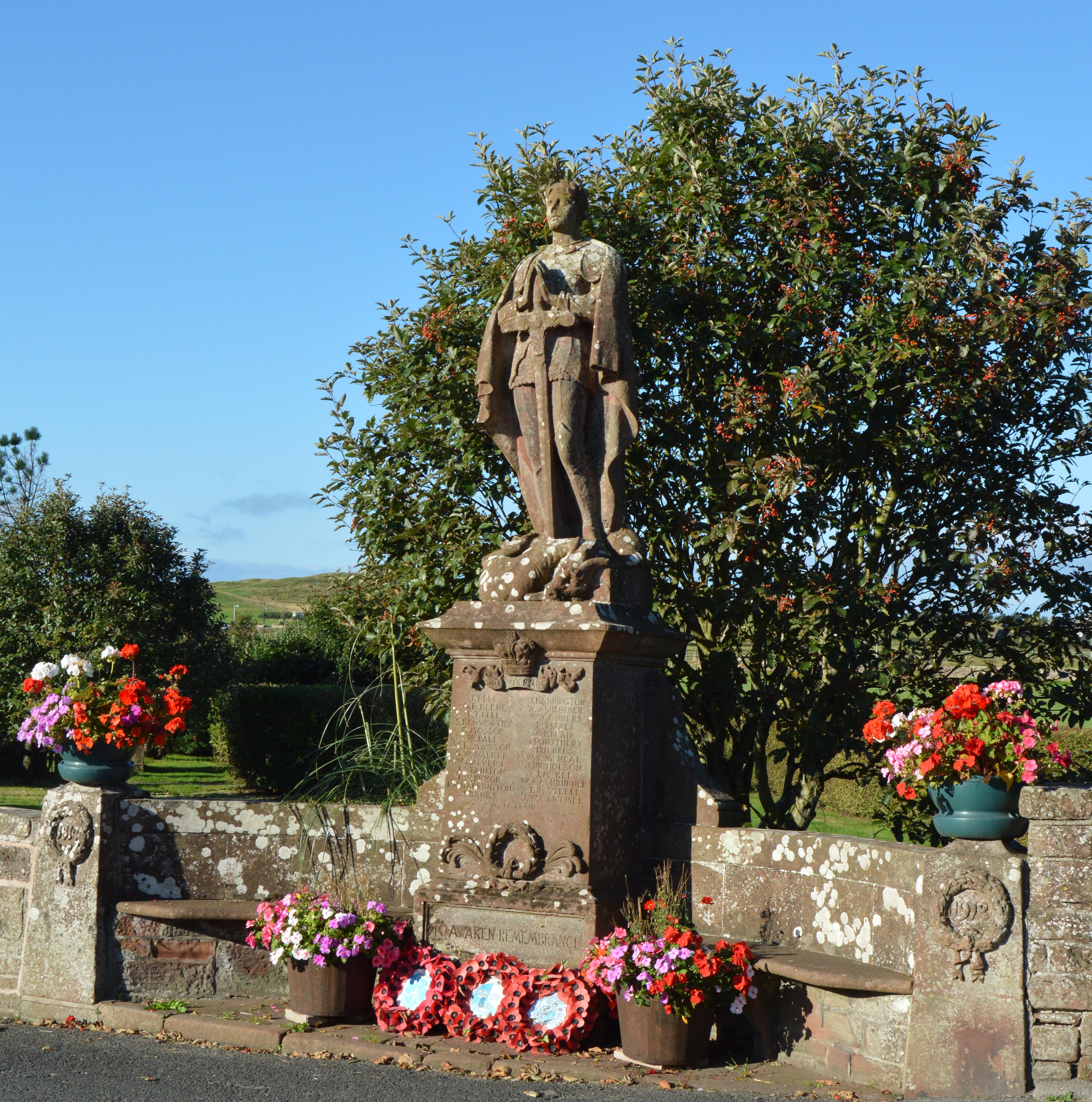
St George and the Dragon war memorial

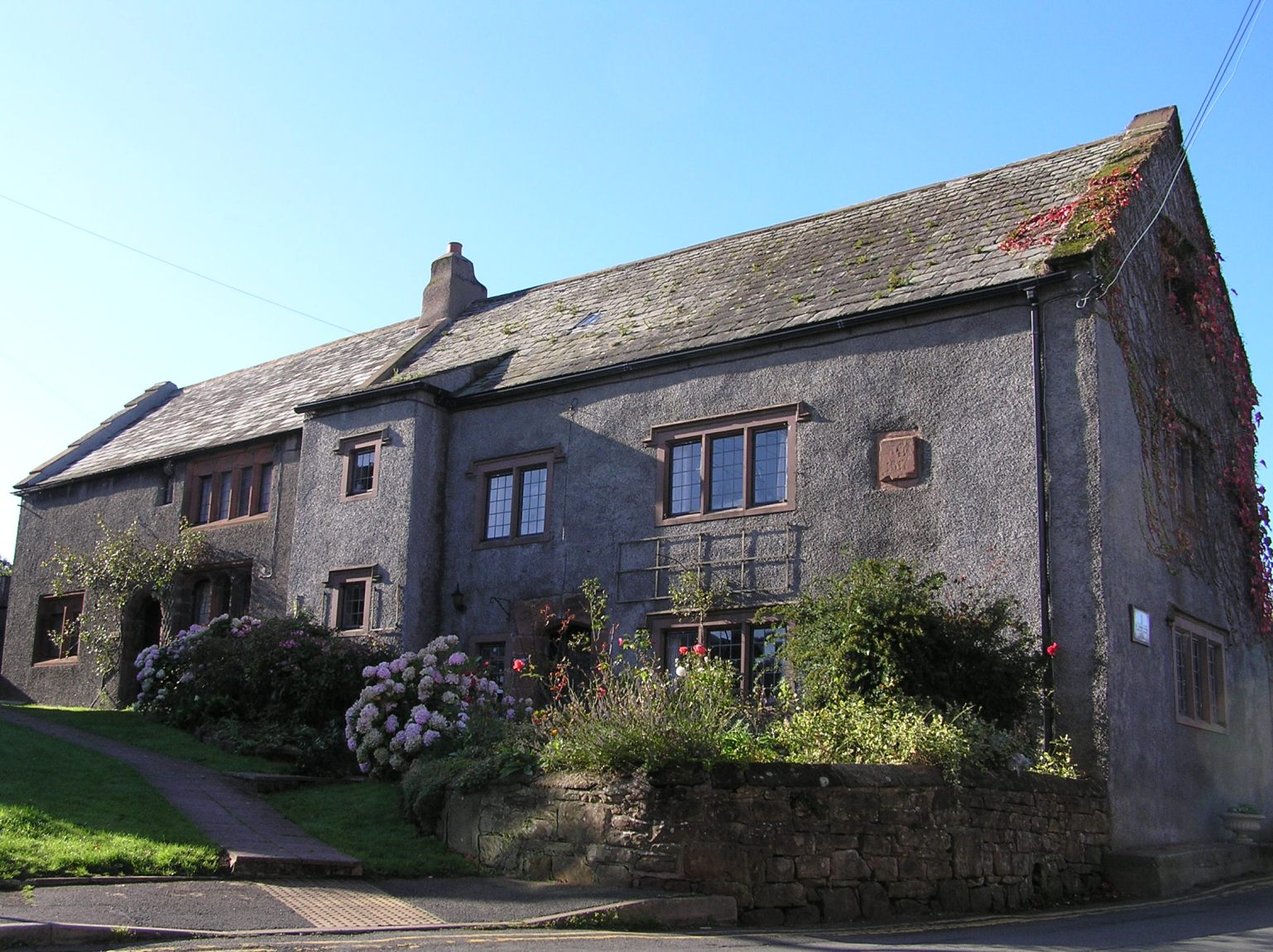
Archbishop Edmund Grindal's birthplace, Cross Hill

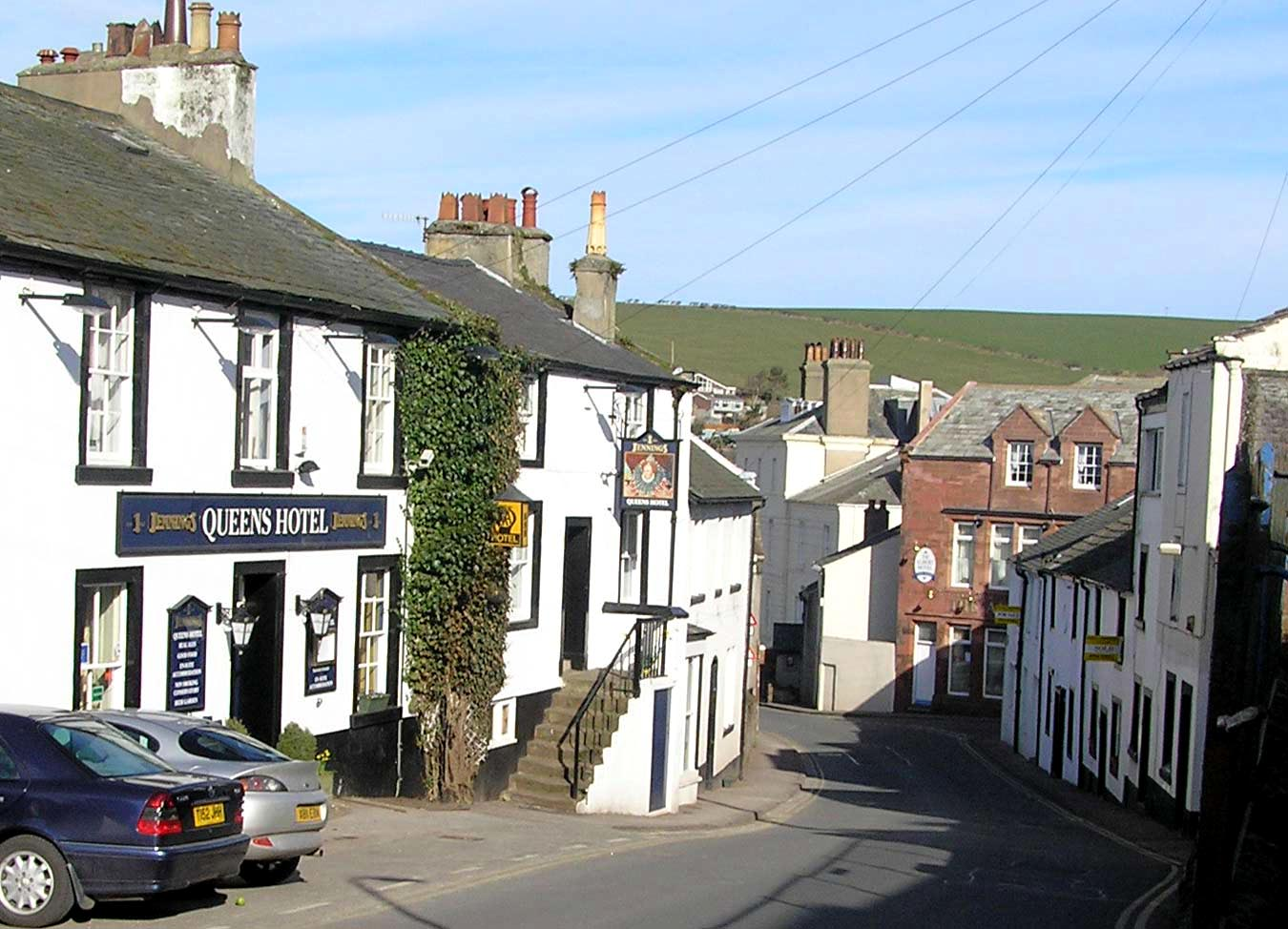
Main Street looking north from Cross Hill

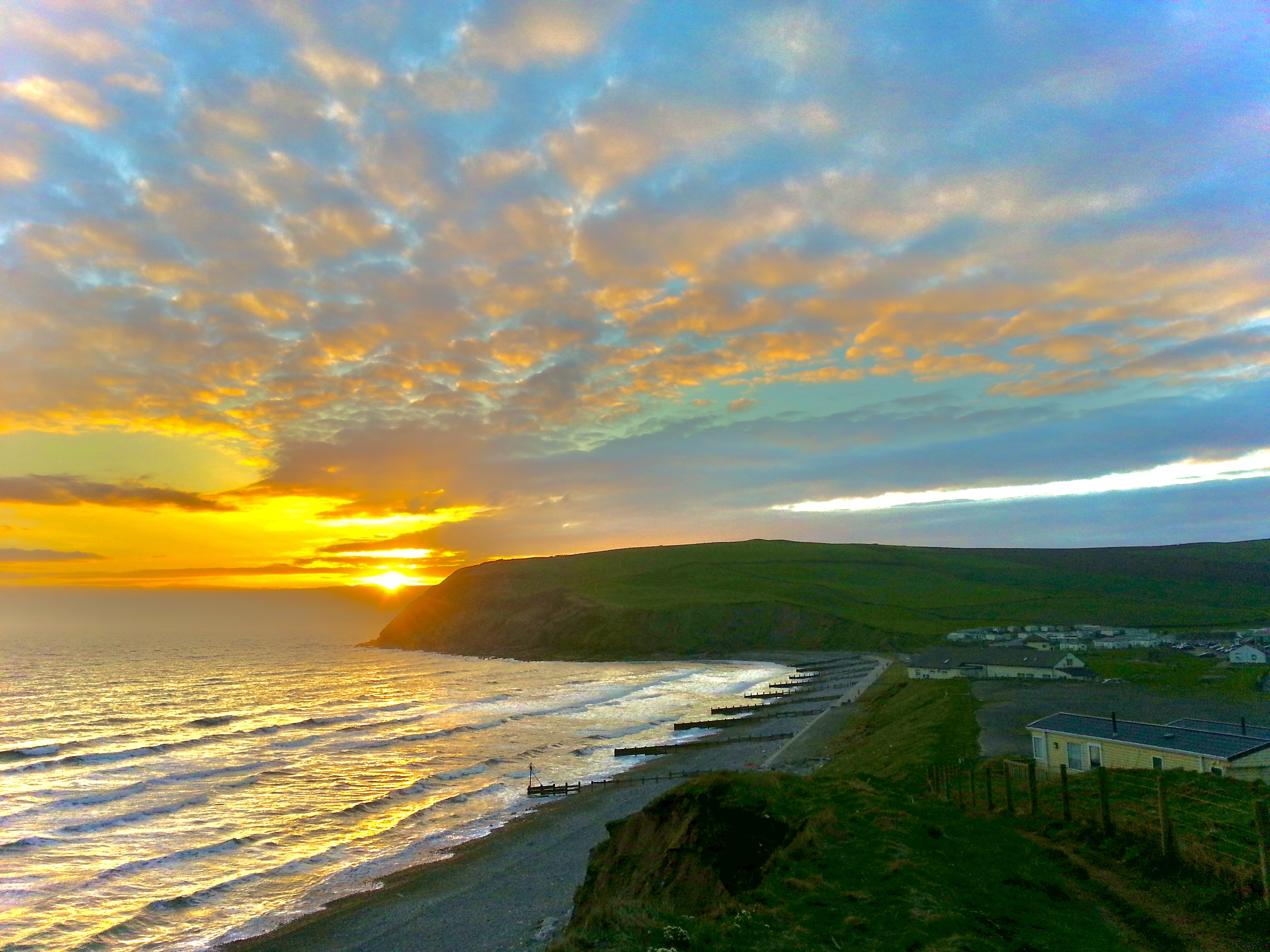
St Bees South Head at sunset

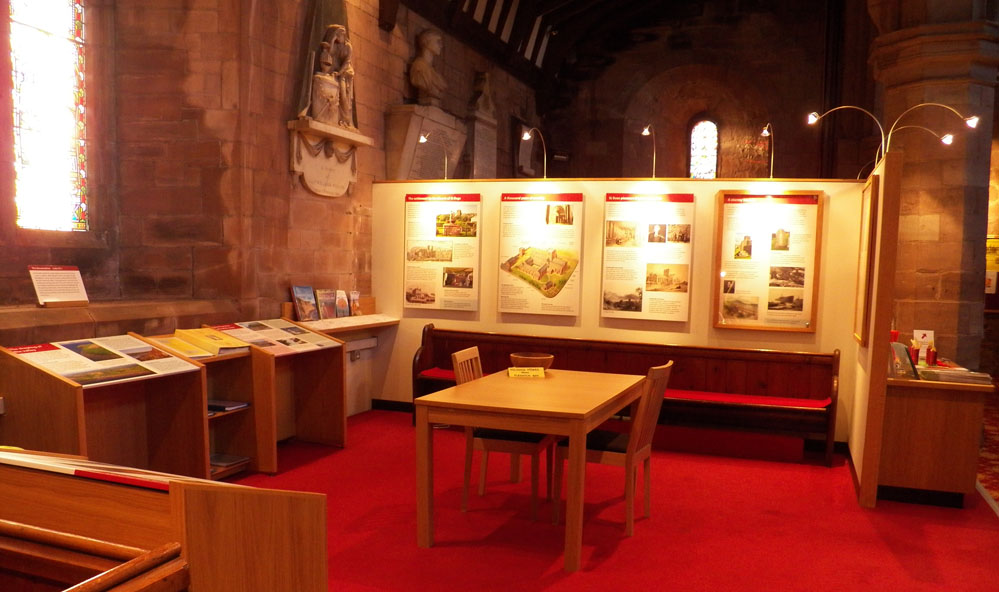
Village history display at the priory

== St Bees Beach ==
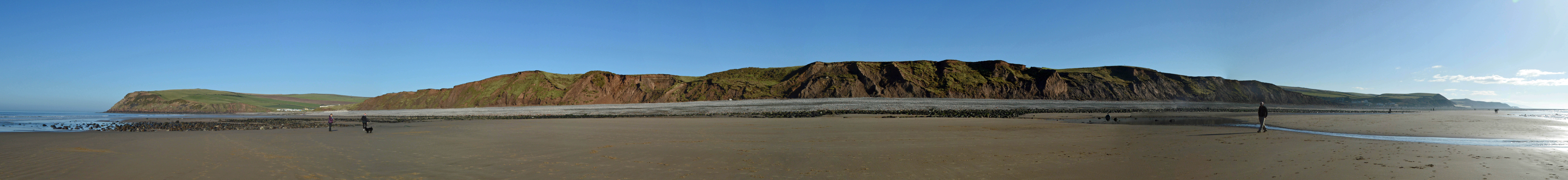
Panorama: St Bees Head in the north to Black Combe in the south. Above the moraine cliffs in the centre is the golf course

== See also ==
- Listed buildings in St Bees
- St Bees railway station
