= Listed buildings in St Bees =

St Bees is a civil parish in the Cumberland district, Cumbria, England. It contains 38 buildings that are recorded in the National Heritage List for England. Of these, four are listed at Grade I, the highest of the three grades, two are at Grade II*, the middle grade, and the others are at Grade II, the lowest grade. The parish includes the village of St Bees and the surrounding coastline and countryside. In the 12th century a Benedictine priory was established in the parish. Most of this disappeared after the Dissolution of the Monasteries apart from the priory church, most of which became the Church of St Mary and St Bega, the parish church of the village, while most of the chancel was modified for other uses. Also in the village is St Bees School, an independent school. The church, the school, and a number of associated structures are listed. Most of the other listed buildings are houses and associated structures, and farmhouses and farm buildings. The other listed buildings include a bridge, a signal box, and two war memorials.

== Key ==
Grade	Criteria
I	Buildings of exceptional interest, sometimes considered to be internationally important
II*	Particularly important buildings of more than special interest
II	Buildings of national importance and special interest

== Buildings ==
Name and location	Photograph	Date	Notes	Grade
Churchyard cross 54.49413°N 3.59363°W		10th century	The cross is in the churchyard of the Church of St Mary and St Bega. It consists of two sandstone steps, the lower in separate blocks, and the upper in one block with a socket. In the socket is a shaft about 3 feet (0.91 m) high that is decorated with interlace and animals.	I
Church of St Mary and St Bega; 54.49385°N 3.59354°W		c. 1120	Originally the church of a Benedictine priory, following the Dissolution of the Monasteries it became the parish church of the village. Later alterations included an extensive restoration by William Butterfield in 1855–58. The church is built in sandstone blocks on a plinth, partly moulded, and it has Welsh slate roofs. It consists of a nave with a clerestory, aisles, transepts, a tower at the crossing, and a short chancel (rest of the chancel is a separate building). At the west end is an original Norman doorway with four semicircular orders.	I
Former chancel, St Bees Priory; 54.49396°N 3.59310°W		Late 12th century	The former chancel of the priory was de-roofed following the Dissolution of the Monasteries. It was re-roofed when it was converted into a theological college in 1816, and has since been used for other purposes, including as a music room by St Bees School. It is built in sandstone blocks, partly on a moulded plinth, with string courses, moulded eaves, and pilaster buttresses. In the north and east walls are lancet windows, and on the south side modern windows have been inserted into a blocked arcade. Under the current wooden floor is a medieval flagged floor.	I
Manor Stead and adjoining house 54.49179°N 3.58949°W		Between 1500 and 1520	Originally a hall house, it was subdivided and remodelled in the 17th century, and remodelled again in 1983–84. The building is in pebbledashed stone with quoins, two storeys, and a slate roof with stone copings and ridge. Manor Stead has three bays, a round-headed doorway with a chamfered surround, windows with chamfered mullions and lights with segmental heads, and a full height stair turret.	II*
Pow Bridge; 54.49308°N 3.59150°W		1585	The bridge carries the B5345 road over Pow Beck, and has since been doubled in width. It is in stone and consists of a single elliptical arch with a span of about 12 feet (3.7 m); its original width was also 12 feet (3.7 m). The east side contains the original stonework, with voussoirs. The parapets date from the widening, they are about 3 feet (0.91 m) high, with flat copings, and they incorporate inscribed panels.	II*
Quadrangle, St Bees School; 54.49439°N 3.59241°W		1587	The buildings form three sides of a quadrangle, The oldest part is the north range; this was extended in 1820, and the other ranges were built in 1842–44. All the ranges have slate roofs with stone copings. The north range is in sandstone on a chamfered plinth, it has three storeys, nine bays, and mullioned windows in architraves. The other ranges are in ashlar on a plinth, and have sash windows in architraves, most with hood moulds. The east range has two storeys and five wings, with a central four-stage embattled clock tower flanked by octagonal turrets. The south range has two storeys, six bays, and a central entrance tower with two octagonal turrets.	II
Sundial; 54.49435°N 3.59334°W		1649	The sundial is in the churchyard of the Church of St Mary and St Bega. It is in sandstone, with an octagonal shaft about 4 feet (1.2 m) high, standing on three steps. On the top is circular brass plate with a gnomon.	II
Property adjoining 125 Main Street; 54.49129°N 3.58999°W	—	17th century	A cottage that was later extended, it is in stone with a slate roof. There are two storeys, and the cottage was originally in two bays, with a third bay added to the right in the 19th century. On the front is a central doorway in a stone surround, windows of varying types, one with a mullion, and hood moulds. At the rear is an outshut forming a porch, and steps leading up to first floor doors. (Note: Street View in April 2011 shows that the cottage has reverted to residential use.)	II
Abbey Farmhouse; 54.49486°N 3.59381°W	—	1679	The main block is stuccoed and has rusticated quoins, and a slate roof with stone copings. There are three storeys, a symmetrical east front of three bays, and a rear outshut. Above the doorway on the north front is a decorative inscribed and dated lintel. To the south is a two-storey two-bay extension All the windows are sashes in stone surrounds.	II
Stone House; 54.49207°N 3.59052°W	—	1712	A stuccoed house with a slate roof, it has two storeys and a symmetrical three-bay front. The central doorway has a cornice, and above it is an ornately framed and pedimented datestone. The windows are sashes in stone surrounds.	II
Moorleys Farmhouse, cottage and barn 54.48007°N 3.56784°W	—	1731	Originally a farmhouse, a cottage and a barn in a linear plan, later used for other purposes. The building is in stone with quoins, the house and cottage are rendered, and the roofs are slated. The house and cottage have two storeys, the house has three bays, and the cottage has one. In the house is a doorway with a chamfered surround, and windows whose mullions have been removed. In the barn there are two wagon entrances and a plank door.	II
How Man; 54.47704°N 3.57163°W	—	1732	Originally a farmhouse, a cottage, and a barn, later combined into one house, it is pebbledashed and has a slate roof. There are two storeys and five bays. On the front is a porch that has a doorway with a chamfered stone surround and a four-centred head. Above the door is a datestone. The windows are mullioned, with hood moulds, and contain sashes each light with a four-centred head.	II
Barn range, Abbey Farm; 54.49468°N 3.59420°W	—	18th century (probable)	The barn range is to the south of Abbey Farmhouse, and is in stone with a slate roof. On the front facing the road are two outshuts, and between them is a wagon entrance. The windows and doors are a varying types. (Note: Street View in April 2011 shows that this has been converted for residential use.)	II
Croft House; 54.49212°N 3.58558°W	—	18th century	Originally a house and a cottage, later combined into a single house, it is stuccoed and has a slate roof with stone copings. There are two storeys and four bays. The doorway has an architrave and is flanked by Tuscan columns carrying a pediment. All the windows are sashes in architraves.	II
Wall, gates and piers, Grindal House; 54.49251°N 3.59067°W	—	Mid 18th century	The walls of the forecourt are in stone on a plinth with a moulded top. They consist of panels with slits, the panels separated by square piers. The gate piers are octagonal, on plinths, and each has a cornice and an ogee cap.	II
Grindal House; 54.49257°N 3.59052°W		Mid 18th century	A stuccoed house with a hipped slate roof. The main block has three storeys and three bays, the ground floor is rusticated and has quoins, and above are string courses, and eaves with egg and dart moulding. Steps lead up to the central doorway that has a rusticated architrave, and in the roof are pedimented dormers. To the right is a two-storey two bay wing with an eaves cornice. All the windows are sashes in architraves, those in the upper two floors of the main block also having rusticated lintels.	II
Fairladies Farmhouse and barn 54.48878°N 3.58997°W	—	Late 18th century	Originally a cottage and a house, later combined into one house, and an adjoining barn. The house is in pebbledashed stone with a slate roof. It has two storeys and six bays, a gabled porch, and sash windows. The barn to the left is in rubble, and has a wagon doorway and steps leading up to a loft door.	II
Manor House Hotel; 54.49145°N 3.58969°W	—	Late 18th to early 19th century	The hotel is stuccoed and has two storeys. The main block has a symmetrical front of five bays with a bay added to the right, rusticated quoins, an eaves cornice, and a roof of 20th-century tiles. There is a doorway with an architrave, Tuscan pilasters, and a broken swan-necked pediment. The windows are sashes in architraves. To the left is a seven-bay wing with a roof of Welsh slate, containing an elliptical-headed coach entrance with imposts and a keystone, a doorway with a decorated architrave, and sash windows.	II
Orchard House; 54.49029°N 3.58965°W	—	Late 18th to early 19th century	A pebbledashed house with a cast iron moulded gutter on brackets and a slate roof. It has a double-depth plan, two storeys, and a symmetrical front of three bays. The doorway and sash windows have plain surrounds.	II
Gill Cottage; 54.47466°N 3.56326°W	—	c. 1803	The cottage is in rendered stone and has a slate roof. There are two storeys, three bays, a single-storey lean-to on the left, and a porch on the right. On the front are two sash windows in the ground floor, and one in the upper floor.	II
Gill Farmhouse; 54.47473°N 3.56336°W	—	1803	The farmhouse is in rendered stone on a plinth, with rusticated quoins, a lintel band, and a slate roof. There are two storeys and a symmetrical front of three bays. In the centre is a doorway with a stone surround, a rectangular fanlight, and a bracketed cornice. Above the door is an inscribed datestone, and the windows are sashes, those in the ground floor having hood moulds.	II
Barn, High House; 54.49440°N 3.58196°W	—	1810	A stone barn with quoins, and a slate roof with a stone ridge and coping. On the front is a central wagon door with an elliptical head, doors, windows, a winnowing door, ventilation slits, and 24 dove holes in a rectangular surround, above which is an inscribed and dated panel. On the east front is an owl hole.	II
16 Finkle Street; 54.49180°N 3.58845°W	—	1818	A stuccoed house with an eaves band and a slate roof. There are two storeys and a symmetrical front of three bays. The central doorway is round-headed with a fanlight and a projecting keystone. Above the door is an inscribed datestone and a blocked window. The windows are sashes, and there is a round-headed stair window at the rear.	II
81 Main Street; 54.48701°N 3.58982°W	—	1838	The house is in stone with quoins, an eaves band, and a roof of 20th-century concrete tiles. There are two storeys and two bays. The doorway has a plain surround and a rectangular fanlight, and there is one sash window on each floor with a stone surround. Above the door is an inscribed and dated panel.	II
82 Main Street; 54.48709°N 3.58984°W	—	c. 1838	A stone house in two storeys with a roof of 20th-century concrete tiles. The main part has rusticated quoins, a symmetrical front of three bays, and a central doorway that has a stone surround with carved imposts, a keystone, and a semicircular fanlight. At the rear is a lower two-bay extension. The windows are sashes in stone surrounds, and in the east front is a round-arched stair window.	II
1–11 Lonsdale Terrace; 54.49231°N 3.58897°W	—	c. 1840	A row of eleven houses, stuccoed, with quoins at the north end, they have a slate roof, hipped at the north end, and are in two storeys. Nos. 1–5 and No. 11 have three bays each, and Nos. 6–10 have two bays. The windows are sashes; Nos. 1–7 have hood moulds, and Nos. 8–11 have cornices on consoles. Steps lead up to the doors that have architraves; Nos, 1–3 have hood moulds, Nos. 8–10 have cornices on consoles, and No. 11 has a Tuscan portico.	II
Railings and gates, St Bees School; 54.49425°N 3.59286°W		c. 1842	The railings and gates are in front of the quadrangle of the school. Flanking the entrance are low walls with wrought iron railings, the sections separated by ornamental standards. The gate piers are octagonal on moulded bases, and have large caps with decorative panels. The gates, also in wrought iron, have scrollwork decoration.	II
1–5 Vale View; 54.49220°N 3.58833°W	—	19th century	A row of five stuccoed houses on a plinth with a rusticated ground floor, a string course, moulded eaves and a slate roof. Each house has three storeys. Nos. 1 and 5 have hipped roofs, three bays, and central doors flanked by three-light mullioned windows, No. 2 has three bays, and Nos. 3 and 4 are mirror images with two bays each. The doors have Tuscan doorcases with cornices, and all the windows are sashes.	II
Ashley House; 54.49195°N 3.58825°W	—	19th century	The house is in rendered stone on a plinth, with corner pilasters and a slate roof. There are three storeys and a symmetrical front of three bays. In the centre is a Tuscan doorcase with a cornice. The windows are sashes with stone surrounds, and in the south front is a stair window with a semicircular head.	II
Wall to west of the Church of St Mary and St Bega; 54.49334°N 3.59387°W		19th century	The wall is in stone, about 7 feet (2.1 m) high, with a flat coping, and it incorporates medieval fragments. In a semicircular niche at the centre is a former wayside cross about 3 feet (0.91 m) high with a wheel-head cross, which has been moved from another site. Also in the wall is a lintel dating probably from the 12th century, and Viking in style. It is carved with a dragon and a warrior with a sword, and this is flanked by areas of interlace decoration.	I
Mayfield and adjoining house 54.49178°N 3.58808°W	—	19th century	A pair of stuccoed houses that have a slate roof with stone copings, and each house has three storeys. Mayfield has two bays, a doorway with a rectangular fanlight and a cornice. The house to the right has a symmetrical front of three bays, a doorway with a rectangular fanlight and a bracketed cornice. All the windows are sashes, some with hood moulds.	II
Library; 54.49382°N 3.59292°W	—	1863	The library was designed by William Butterfield in Gothic style. It is in sandstone blocks on a plinth, with quoins, bands, a concave eaves course, and a slate roof with stone copings, a scalloped ridge, and an apex cross. There are two storeys, a single-storey bay window on the north front, a doorway with a pointed head on the west, and mullioned windows.	II
Redbourn House; 54.48872°N 3.58967°W	—	c. 1870	A stuccoed house with corner pilasters, a cornice between the floors, a string course, an eaves cornice, and Welsh slate roof with stone coping. There are two storeys and four bays, the left two bays being recessed. In the second bay is a doorway with a semicircular head, a hood mould, and a keystone. Above the right two bays is a pedimented gable on pilasters with swag decoration. All the windows are sashes in architraves.	II
Walls, railings and gate piers, Redbourn House; 54.48874°N 3.58975°W	—	c. 1870	The walls are in stone, ramped, and have chamfered coping. The gate piers are square, on a plinth, and have gabled capitals. On the walls are decorative cast iron railings with pedimented panels and urn finials.	II
Signal box 54.49274°N 3.59126°W		1891	The signal box was built for the Furness Railway. It has two storeys, the lower part being in sandstone, and it has a hipped slate roof. The lower part is slightly tapering, and contains lancet windows and a larger window, now blocked. The upper part, the operating room, has windows on all sides, complete on the east and the north sides, and is entered by an external staircase. Inside is the original 24-lever frame.	II
War memorial in churchyard 54.49420°N 3.59304°W		1919	The war memorial was designed by W. G. Collingwood, and is in the churchyard of the Church of St Mary and St Bega. It is in stone, and consists of a monolithic Celtic cross about 10 feet (3.0 m) high. It is decorated with interlace, and is inscribed with the names of those lost.	II
War memorial by Pow Bridge; 54.49294°N 3.59145°W		c. 1920	Designed by J. D. Kenworthy, the war memorial is in St Bees sandstone. It depicts Saint George in Roman dress, wearing a toga, with a dragon at his feet.	II
Lych gate, Church of St Mary and St Bega; 54.49413°N 3.59294°W		Early 20th century	The lych gate is at the entrance to the churchyard, and is in Gothic style. It is in stone with quoins, and has a slate roof with stone copings and an apex cross. There are four-centred arches on three sides, and it contains a wooden gate.	II

== Notes and references ==
=== Sources ===
- Historic England, "Cross in churchyard to north of Priory Church nave, St Bees (1336028)", National Heritage List for England
- Historic England, "Church of St Mary and St Bega, St Bees (1336027)", National Heritage List for England
- Historic England, "St Bees School; Music room in former chancel to Priory Church of St Mary and St Bega, St Bees (1086681)", National Heritage List for England
- Historic England, "Manor Stead and house adjoining to north, St Bees (1086684)", National Heritage List for England
- Historic England, "Pow Bridge over Pow Beck, St Bees (1137347)", National Heritage List for England
- Historic England, "St Bees School; buildings around quadrangle to south-west, St Bees (1086678)", National Heritage List for England
- Historic England, "Sundial in churchyard to north-east of Priory Church chancel, St Bees (1312351)", National Heritage List for England
- Historic England, "Property adjoining south end of No. 125 Main Street, St Bees (1086691)", National Heritage List for England
- Historic England, "Abbey Farmhouse, St Bees (1086679)", National Heritage List for England
- Historic England, "Stone House, St Bees (1137416)", National Heritage List for England
- Historic England, "Moorleys farmhouse, cottage, and barn to north-east of How Man, St Bees (1137285)", National Heritage List for England
- Historic England, "How Man, to south-west of Howman Bridge, St Bees (1086676)", National Heritage List for England
- Historic England, "Barn range adjoining south end of Abbey Farmhouse, St Bees (1086680)", National Heritage List for England
- Historic England, "Croft House, St Bees (1086686)", National Heritage List for England
- Historic England, "Forecourt wall, gate, and end piers to front of Grindal House, St Bees (1336025)", National Heritage List for England
- Historic England, "Grindal House, St Bees (1086677)", National Heritage List for England
- Historic England, "Fairladies Farmhouse and adjoining barn, St Bees (1086690)", National Heritage List for England
- Historic England, "Manor House Hotel incorporating Nos 10, 11 and 12 Main Street, St Bees (1086687)", National Heritage List for England
- Historic England, "Orchard House, St Bees (1312348)", National Heritage List for England
- Historic England, "Gill Cottage, St Bees (1336024)", National Heritage List for England
- Historic England, "Gill Farmhouse, St Bees (1086675)", National Heritage List for England
- Historic England, "Barn to north-east of High House, St Bees (1312335)", National Heritage List for England
- Historic England, "No. 16 Finkle Street, St Bees (1312334)", National Heritage List for England
- Historic England, "No. 81 Main Street, St Bees (1312344)", National Heritage List for England
- Historic England, "No. 82 Main Street, St Bees (1086689)", National Heritage List for England
- Historic England, "Nos. 1 to 11 Lonsdale Terrace, St Bees (1137383)", National Heritage List for England
- Historic England, "Railings and gate closing west side of quadrangle at St Bees School, St Bees (1336026)", National Heritage List for England
- Historic England, "Nos. 1 to 5 Vale View, St Bees (1312314)", National Heritage List for England
- Historic England, "Ashley House, north-east of No. 16 Finkle Street, St Bees (1336030)", National Heritage List for England
- Historic England, "Wall, to west of Priory Church nave, incorporating medieval cross and lintel, St Bees (1137319)", National Heritage List for England
- Historic England, "Mayfield and house adjoining to east, St Bees (1086685)", National Heritage List for England
- Historic England, "Library to south-east of Priory Church chancel, St Bees (1336029)", National Heritage List for England
- Historic England, "Redbourn House, St Bees (1137390)", National Heritage List for England
- Historic England, "Forecourt walls, railings, and gate piers to Redbourn House, St Bees (1086688)", National Heritage List for England
- Historic England, "St Bees Signal Box, St Bees (1412068)", National Heritage List for England
- Historic England, "War Memorial in Parish Churchyard to north of lych gate, St Bees (1086682)", National Heritage List for England
- Historic England, "War Memorial adjoining south end of west parapet to Pow Bridge, St Bees (1086683)", National Heritage List for England
- Historic England, "Lych gate to north-east of Priory Church chancel, St Bees (1137338)", National Heritage List for England
- Historic England, Listed Buildings
- Hyde, Matthew; Pevsner, Nikolaus (2010) [1967], Cumbria, The Buildings of England, New Haven and London: Yale University Press, ISBN 978-0-300-12663-1
