= St Bees Man =

Preserved body found in a Cumbria church in 1981

St Bees Man was the name given to the extremely well-preserved body of a medieval man discovered in the grounds of St Bees Priory, Cumbria, in 1981. His identity was subsequently established with a high degree of probability as Anthony de Lucy, 3rd Baron Lucy, who died in 1368, probably killed on crusade at New Kaunas, in what is now Lithuania.

== Discovery ==
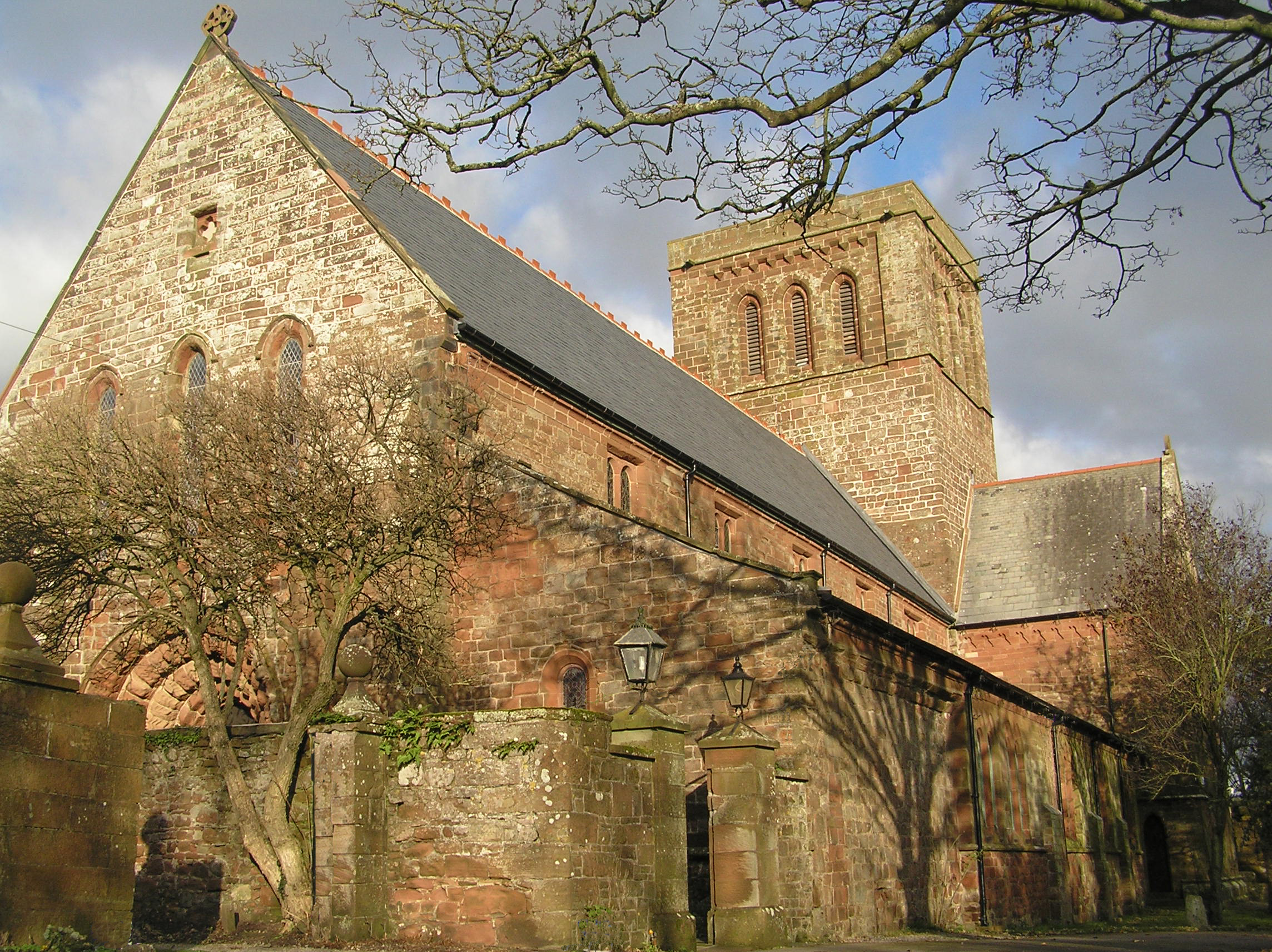
St Bees Priory from the south-west

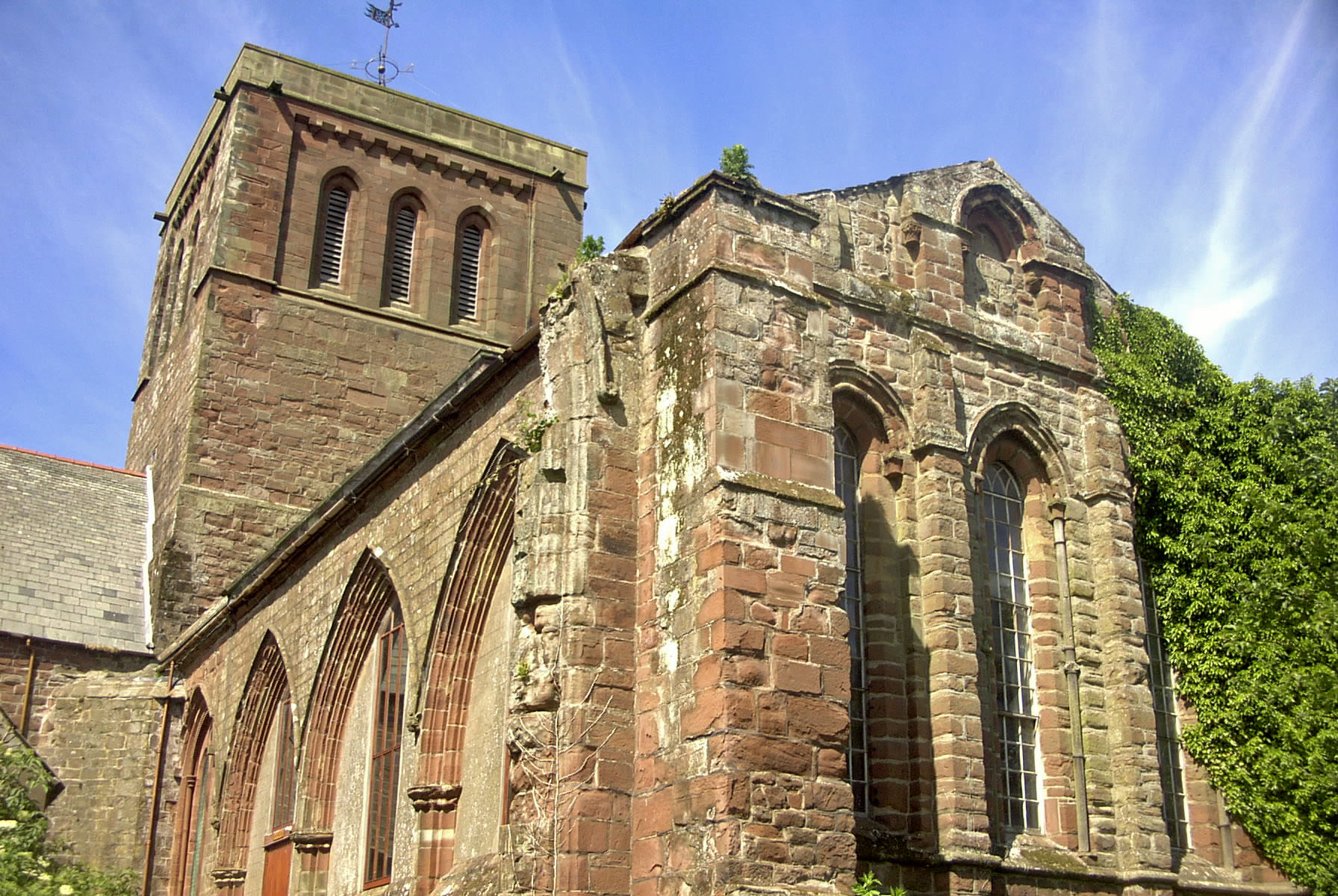
The late-12th-century monastic chancel, showing the ruined east end of the chancel aisle on the left

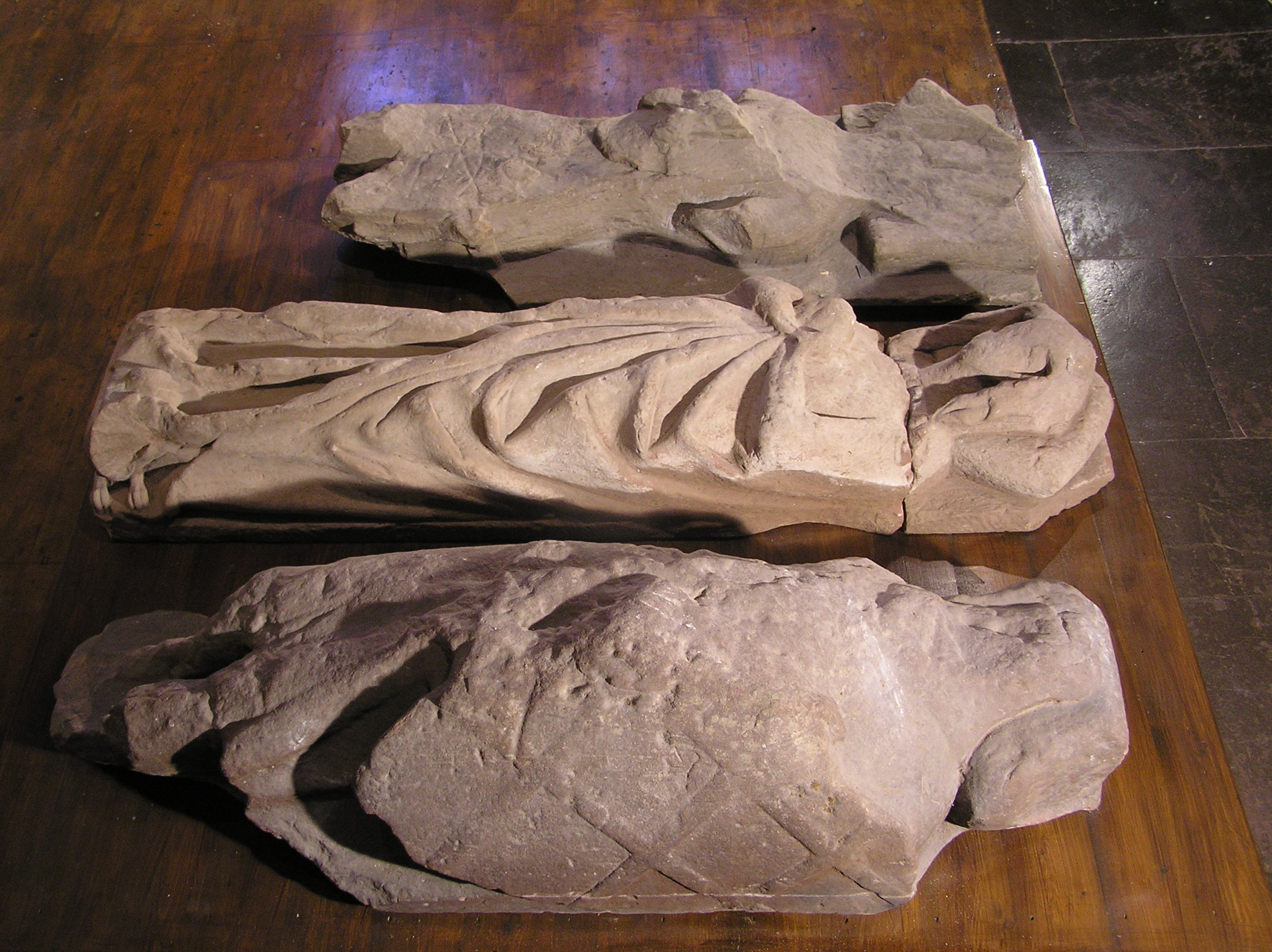
The top effigy is thought to be Anthony de Lucy, and in the middle, Maud de Lucy.

St Bees Man was discovered during an archaeological dig by the University of Leicester on the site of St Bees Priory. The 1981 dig examined two areas of the ruined chancel aisle at the west end of the priory. The aisle was built in about 1300 in the Decorated style, and is thought to have fallen into ruin before the dissolution of the priory in 1539 due to structural failure caused by poor foundations.

The body was found buried in a wooden coffin, wrapped in lead sheet. Despite the lead sheet being damaged at the foot end, the body was in a remarkable state of preservation. The body was wrapped in two shrouds, which are on display in the priory. Since the body's identity was unknown, he was dubbed "St Bees Man".

Film shown on an episode of Antiques Road Trip (series 25 episode 12) showed the lead sheet being opened with a circular saw in front of an audience of adults and children. The body was displayed in its lead sheet to the camera.

The coffin and contents were examined forensically over the following week. The body was reported to exhibit pink skin and visible irises immediately after being exhumed. An autopsy performed on the body shortly after its discovery indicated that the cause of death was most likely a haemothorax caused by a direct blow to the torso.

Although the body was about 600 years old, his nails, skin and stomach contents were found to be in near-perfect condition. The lead sheet in which the body was wrapped excluded moisture whilst the pine pitch coating of the shroud excluded air.

The body was subsequently re-buried in the churchyard at St Bees.

== Identity ==
The identity of St Bees Man is now considered almost certainly to be Anthony de Lucy, who may have been born in 1332/1333 and was probably killed in 1368, fighting for the Teutonic Knights in the Northern Crusades against the Lithuanians. This was established in 2010 after an osteobiographical approach was taken in identifying the skeleton of the woman who was buried with him, which was still available for analysis using modern methods developed since the remains were found in 1981. It is now thought that after his death the vault was enlarged to take the body of his sister, Maud de Lucy, who died in 1398.

It is possible that Anthony de Lucy was sent on crusade in Lithuania by Thomas de Beauchamp, 11th Earl of Warwick, who had been appointed to a supervisory role over the Wardens of the Marches in 1367, after de Lucy had caused trouble on the English-Scottish border (raiding Annandale, for example). Warwick had been on crusade to Lithuania previously and probably saw a way to re-direct the troublesome energies of de Lucy away from the Scottish Marches. (Warwick's three sons also travelled with de Lucy.)

A letter written by John De Moulton of Frampton to his wife in 1367, confirms that; "Anthony de Lucy and I and all our company make our way towards the parts of Spruz [i.e. Prussia]..." along with Richard de Welby "my companion." It seems that John De Moulton also died at New Kaunas, along with a Sir Roger Felbrigg, a Norfolk knight. The Moultons had close family and tenurial ties with the Lucy family.

Anthony was the last of the male line, and the de Lucy estates passed to Maud on his death. Maud also inherited considerable estates after the death of her first husband Gilbert de Umfraville in 1380/81, and probably in a move to ally herself politically with the Percy family, Henry Percy "purchased the licence fee on Gilbert's lands and, therefore, the hand of Maud in 1381".

Maud's connection with St Bees is proven by an existing stone in the priory belfry which carries the quartered arms of the de Lucy and Percy families. Maud insisted on this quartering as part of the marriage agreement, probably so that the de Lucy arms should be perpetuated.

== Exhibition ==
There is an extensive history display in the priory in which the shrouds are exhibited. Effigies thought to be of both Maud and Anthony can also be seen.

== In literature ==
"Anthony de Luce", a fictionalized version of Anthony de Lucy, appears in "The Stonemason's Tale", a historical mystery by Ann Swinfen, set in 1354 Oxford. He is the intended victim of the vandalism which drives the plot.

The Baron's Son, the Unsung Story of Anthony de Lucy and His Sister Maude in 14th Century England, by Karen Charbonneau, ISBN 979-8-9941982-0-9, (2026), an historical novel, is available on Amazon.com and Amazon UK.

== See also ==
- Tollund Man
- Lindow Man
- Ötzi
- Bocksten Man

== Further sources ==
Presenters: Tim Sutherland, Helen Goodchild, Ian McAndrew, Chris Robson (2014). "The Knight of Saint Bees". Medieval dead. Season 2. Episode 1. 60 minutes in. Yesterday Channel.
