= St Bees Priory =

Church in Cumbria, England

Coordinates: 54.493777°N 3.593461°W

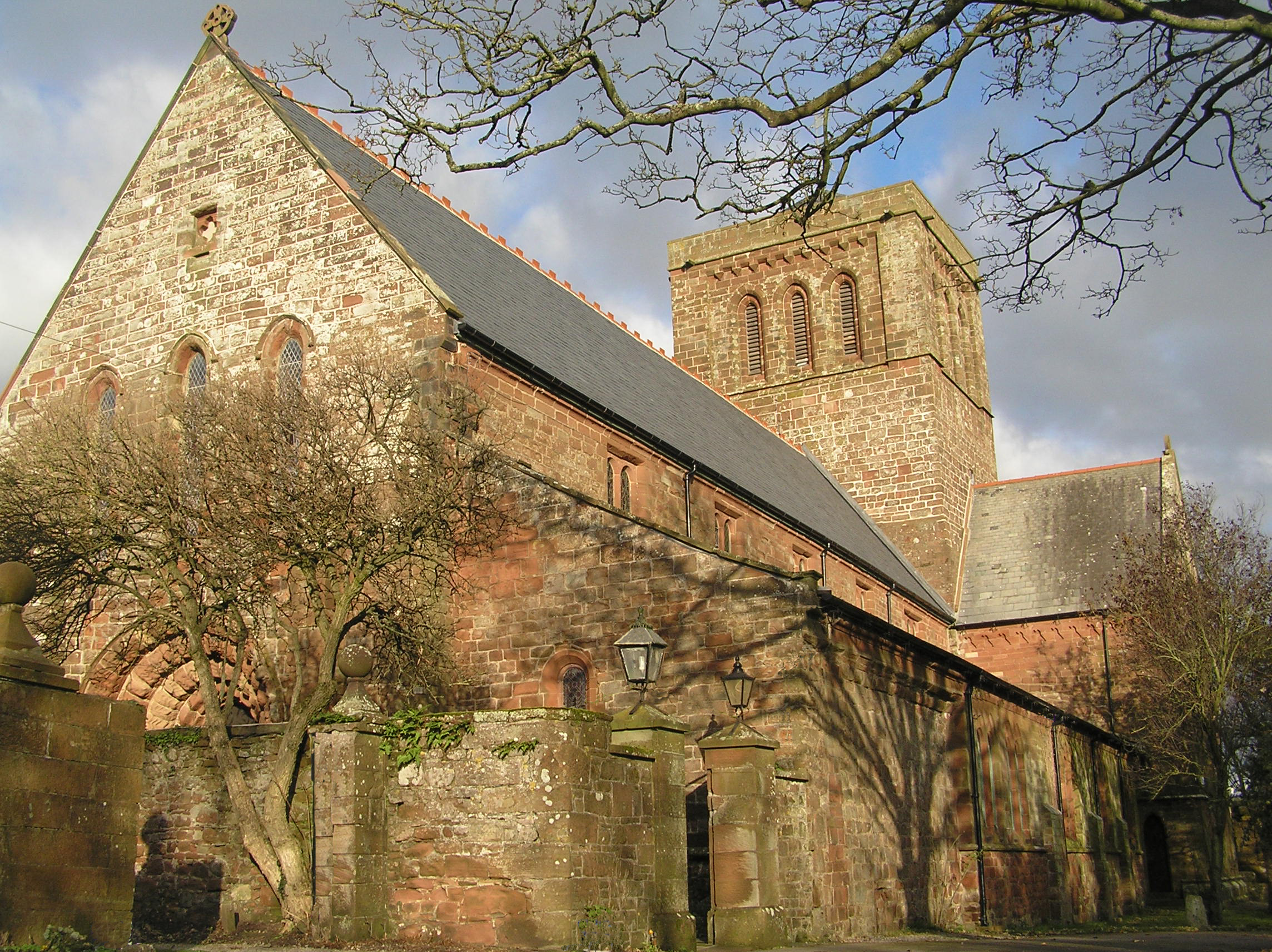
- St Bees Priory Church in 2008
- Interactive map of St Bees Priory

Monastery information
- Full name: The Priory Church of Saint Mary and Saint Bega
- Other names: Priory Church of SS Mary and Bega
- Order: Benedictine
- Established: Ca. 1130
- Disestablished: 1539
- Mother house: St Mary's Abbey, York
- Diocese: Carlisle

People
- Founder: William Meschin

Site
- Location: St Bees, Cumbria, England
- Visible remains: Nave, tower crossing, and transepts: still used as the parish church. Monastic chancel: formerly the theological college, now used as parish rooms.
- Public access: Yes

St Bees Priory is the parish church of St Bees, Cumbria, in England. There is evidence of a pre-Norman religious site, on which a Benedictine priory was founded by the first Norman Lord of Egremont William Meschin. It was dedicated by Archbishop Thurstan of York, sometime between 1120 and 1135.

Sculptural and charter evidence suggests the site was a principal centre of religious influence in the west of the county, and an extensive parish developed, with detached portions covering much of the Western Lakes. (Note: See John M. Todd The pre-Conquest Church in St Bees, Cumbria)

The priory was dissolved in 1539. Since then, the buildings have served as the Anglican church of St Bees parish, and are now Grade I listed buildings.

== Pre-Norman church ==
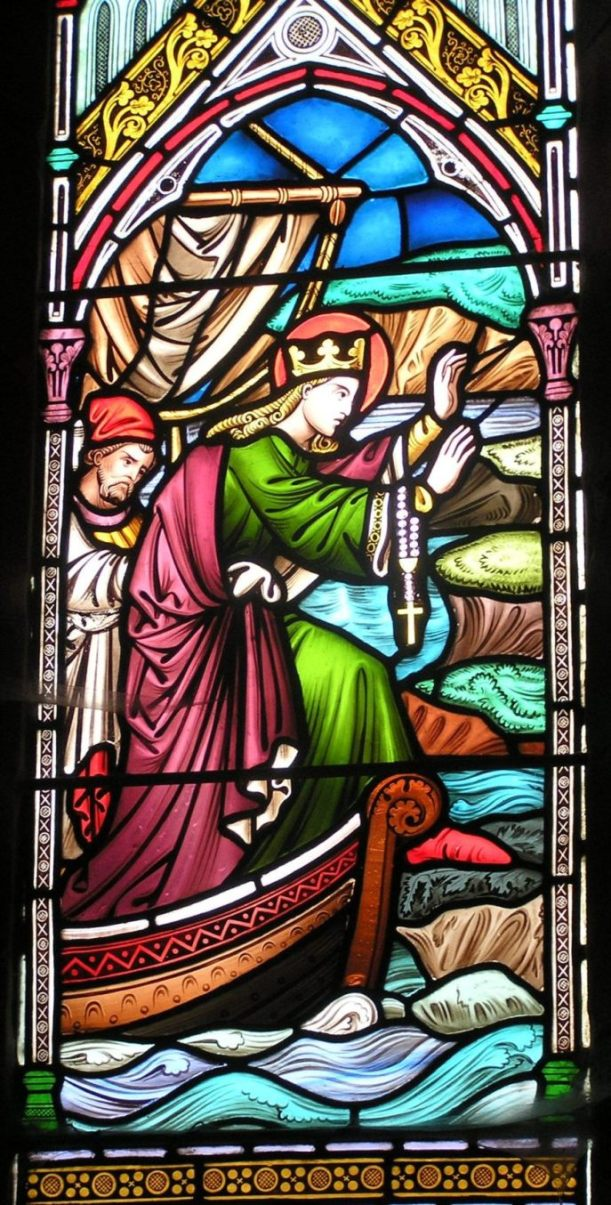
Window showing the arrival of St Bega at St Bees

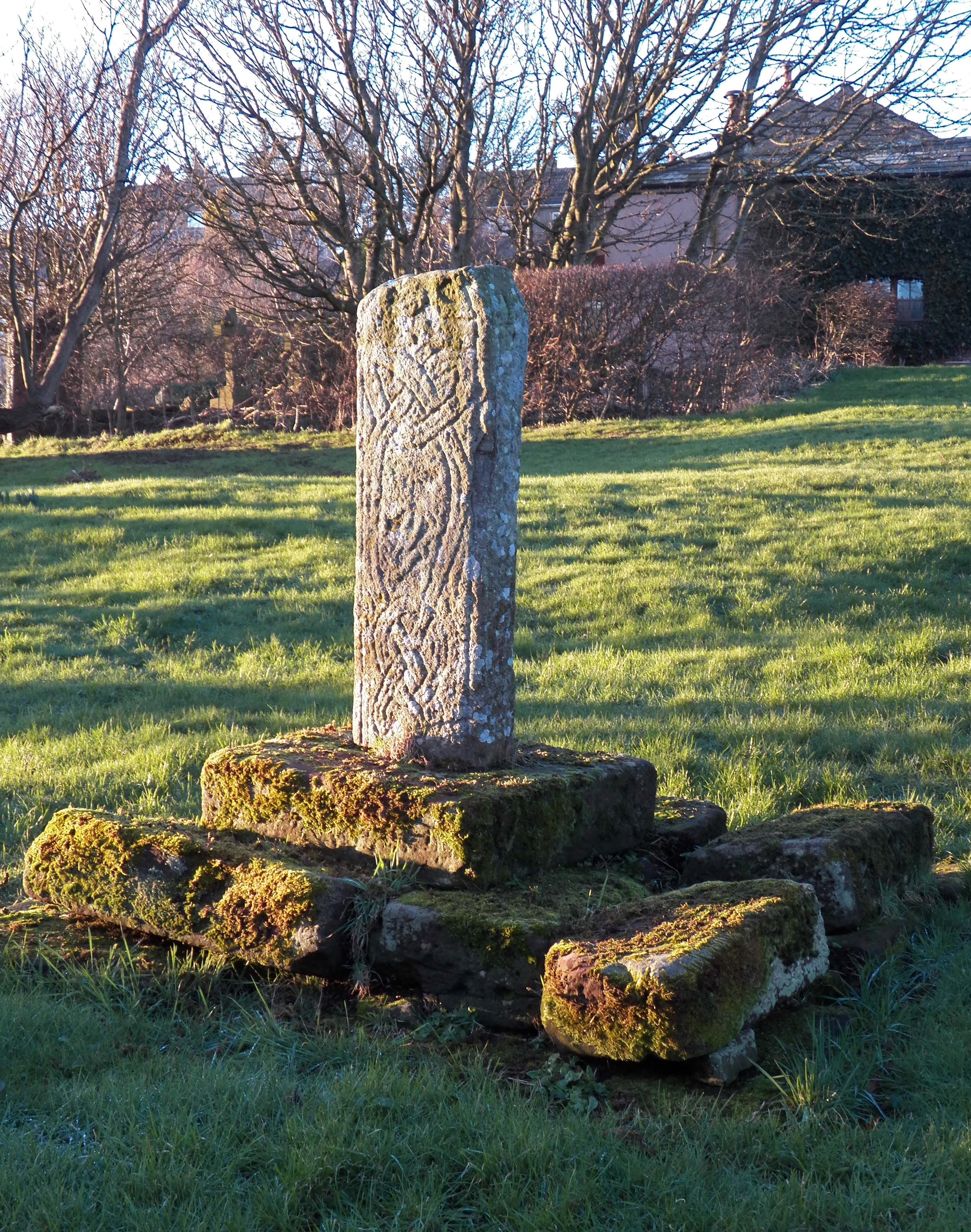
Remains of the 10th-century cross in the graveyard

There is sculptural and place-name evidence for the existence of a pre-Norman religious site, although no buildings still remain from that time. The St Bees place-name is derived from 'Kirkeby Becok' (the 'Church town of Bega'), which was used in the 12th Century. St Bega, a mysterious figure from pre-Norman Britain, is said to have been an Irish princess who fled across the sea to St Bees to avoid an enforced marriage. According to the legend, she then lived a life of piety at St Bees. The most likely period for her journey would have been sometime in the thirty years after 850, when the Vikings were settling Ireland.

The continuance of the cult of St Bega following the arrival of the Normans is recorded in the Register of the Priory by the swearing of oaths on the "Bracelet of St Bega". This relic was touched as the means of taking a binding oath; oaths are recorded up to 1279, and offerings to the bracelet were made as late as 1516.

A cross shaft dating from the 10th century is in the graveyard, showing Viking influence. There is also a cross shaft of the Cumbrian spiral-scroll school from the same period, now in the church. Both show evidence of this being a pre-Norman religious site.

Pre-Norman parish boundaries suggest that St Bees had considerable influence in the west, and it has been suggested that St Bees was a "minster church" serving the west coast, but there is no firm evidence.

== The priory ==
=== Founding ===
The Normans did not reach this part of Cumbria until 1092. William Meschin, supported by Archbishop Thurstan, used the existing religious site to found a Benedictine priory between 1120 and 1135. The priory was subordinate to the Benedictine monastery of St Mary's Abbey, York, and had a prior and six monks. To endow the priory, there were many original grants of property and churches from local lords including the parish of Kirkeby Becok itself, which stretched from the coast at present-day Whitehaven to the River Keekle, and down to where the river "Egre" (Ehen) falls into the sea. Also granted were the chapel of Egremont, churches at Whicham and Bootle, land in Rottington, and the manor of Stainburn at Workington. St Bees was therefore the principal religious centre in the west of Cumbria, and the large number of existing medieval grave slabs of the local nobility indicates its importance.

=== Growth and decline ===
Later grants endowed the priory with the churches of Workington, Gosforth, Corney and Whitbeck, and the chapels of Harrington, Clifton, Loweswater and Weddicar. These and a number of other gifts made St Bees the third-richest monastic house in the county. Around 1190, the priory was enlarged by constructing a new chancel at the east end, and further enlarged c. 1270–1300 by the addition of an aisle along the south of this chancel.

In its most prosperous and active period, the 14th–15th centuries, the priory had not only a large church, but a range of monastic domestic buildings.

None of the priors rose to great prominence in the wider church, though two became Abbots of York. Possibly the relative isolation of St Bees meant that it was out of the mainstream of monastic politics. However, its proximity to the Scottish border had disadvantages. It is known the priory suffered in 1315 from Scots raiders, when after the Battle of Bannockburn James Douglas came south and raided the priory and destroyed two of its mansions. There is also an undated raid, possibly occurring in 1216, 1174, or further back in the reign of King Stephen.

The monks were active in early coal mining, and the earliest reference to mining in the Whitehaven area is in the time of Prior Langton (1256–82), concerning the coal mines at Arrowthwaite. In addition to husbandry, there is evidence the monks ran a mill in the village. Charter 423 of the priory refers to a grant of all the water in Rottington for the use of the priory sometime between 1240 and 1265.

Despite this prosperity it is likely, as with many monastic houses, that the priory was running down by the time of the Dissolution of the Monasteries, as the large chapel in the chancel south aisle at the east end appears to have become ruined about 1500, but not rebuilt. This can be seen in Bucks' view of the priory dating from 1739, and some of the ruins are still visible.

=== Dissolution ===
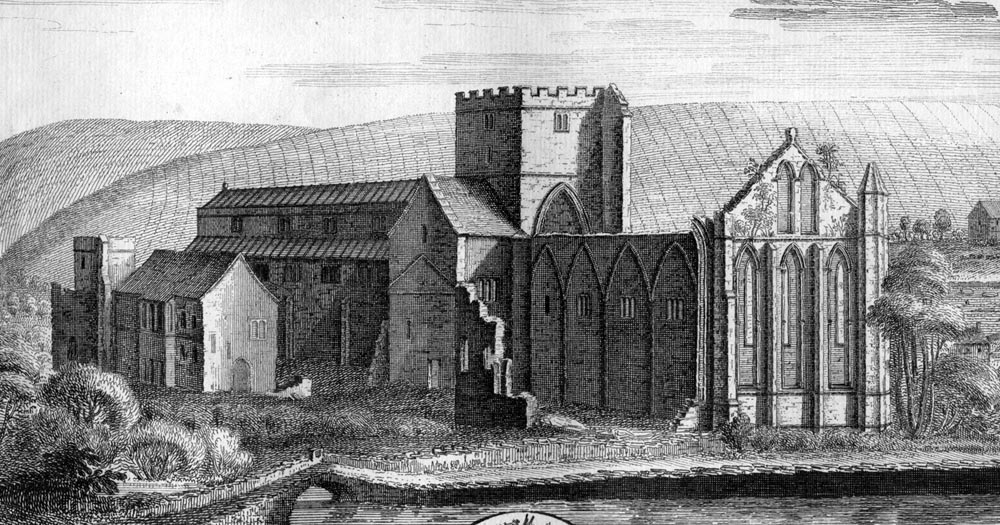
Bucks' view of the St Bees Priory (1739), which shows the remains of the cloister, and the ruined chancel of the monastic church (right). The nave continued in use as the parish church after the monastery's closure in 1539.

The monastic priory was dissolved on 16 October 1539. The nave, tower, and transepts continued in use as the parish church, and some of the cloister range was retained as a residence for the parish priest. This was demolished in 1816, when a new vicarage was built and the theological college was founded. The monastic chancel at the east end was rendered roofless and the east arch of the tower was infilled with a dividing wall. The chapter house and east range of buildings were demolished.

=== Burials in the priory ===
- William de Lancaster I
- Anthony de Lucy, 3rd Baron Lucy (d. 1368)
- Prior Thomas de Cotyngham

== The parish church ==
Following the Dissolution, the priory nave continued in use as the parish church. By 1611 it was necessary to undertake considerable repairs, including the large bell tower which was structurally repaired to prevent further collapse; it had deteriorated to not far above the present arches. There was continuing attention by a series of small repairs going through the 17th and 18th centuries. In the 18th century the west door was not used, probably because the land abutting the door had passed into secular ownership, and the congregation entered via a north porch. By the early 1800s the building was in a poor state of repair.

=== The Theological College ===
In 1816 George Henry Law, Bishop of Chester, in whose diocese the priory then was, founded the St Bees Theological College. The monastic chancel, which had been roofless since the Dissolution, was re-roofed to become the main college lecture room and library. The students lodged in the village and the college principal was also the Vicar of St Bees. The college was very successful, training over 2,600 clergy. It closed in 1895, both at the prospect of falling numbers as it could not award degrees, and its vulnerability as a private institution as students now favoured the larger colleges that had been created using the St Bees model.

=== Restoration ===
The 19th century was the era of restoration, helped significantly by the presence of the Theological College and the increasing prosperity of the village. The west door came into use again, a new vicarage was built to the west, and the last of the monastic cloister was demolished. The nave and transepts were re-roofed, and to accommodate a new organ in 1867 the west gallery was taken down. The altar was moved from under the tower east into a new chancel, which occupied one bay of the monastic choir. The tower was re-built in the Romanesque style to the design of William Butterfield when the eight bells were installed in 1858. The north and south aisles were partly rebuilt and completely furnished with new stained glass. In 1899 the present magnificent "Father" Henry Willis organ was installed.

=== Present use ===
The church continues in use as the parish church of St Bees. In 1953 the Butterfield Romanesque spire was removed, and the bells were re-hung. In the 1960s the central pew arrangement was removed to give a centre aisle, and in the 1990s a doorway was built between the church and the monastic choir, which now acts as one of the parish rooms. In the south aisle lapidarium are collections of effigies and carved stones, including a very fine incised stone of Prior Cotyngham. There is also a comprehensive history display created in 2010.

== Architecture ==
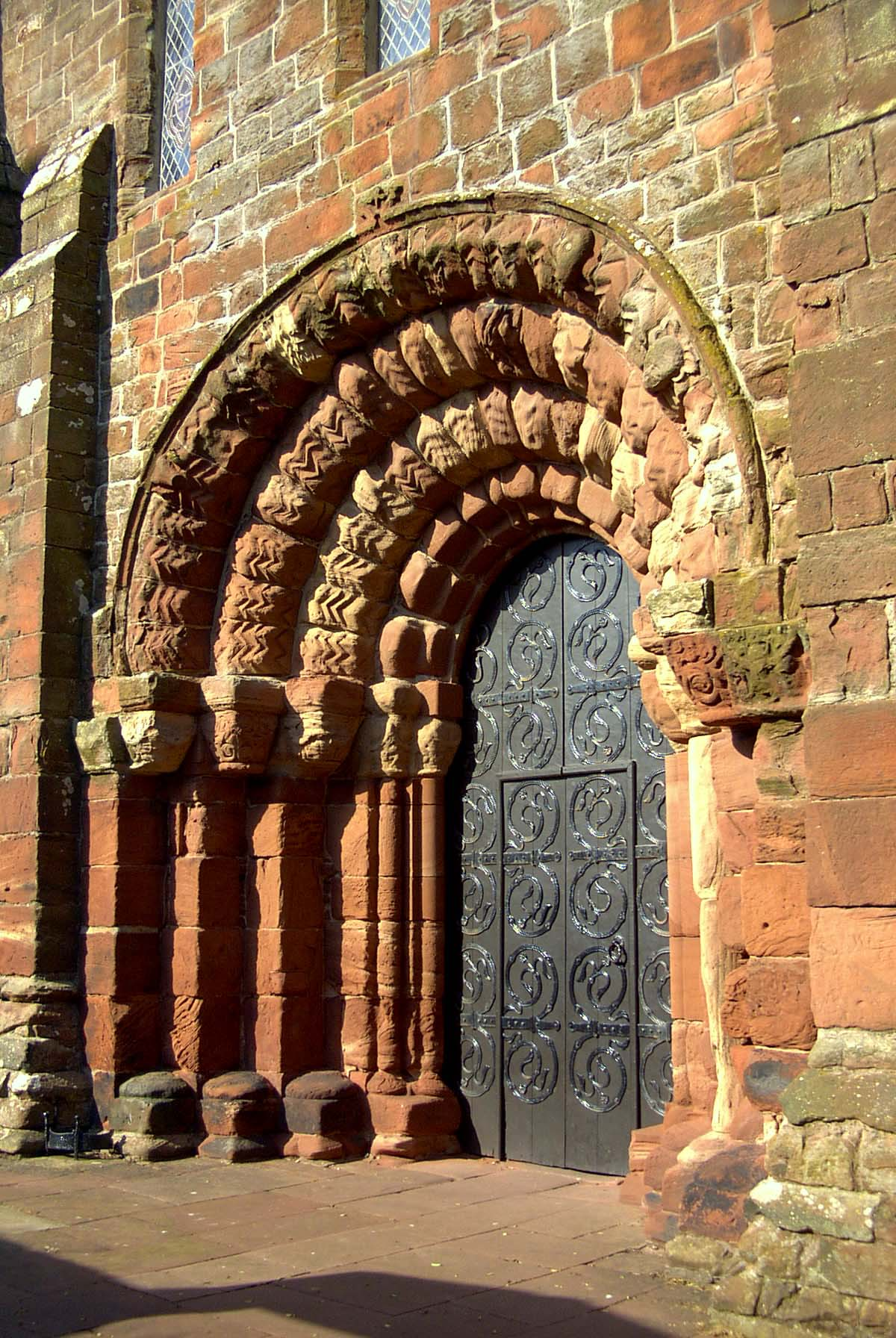
West door of St Bees Priory Church

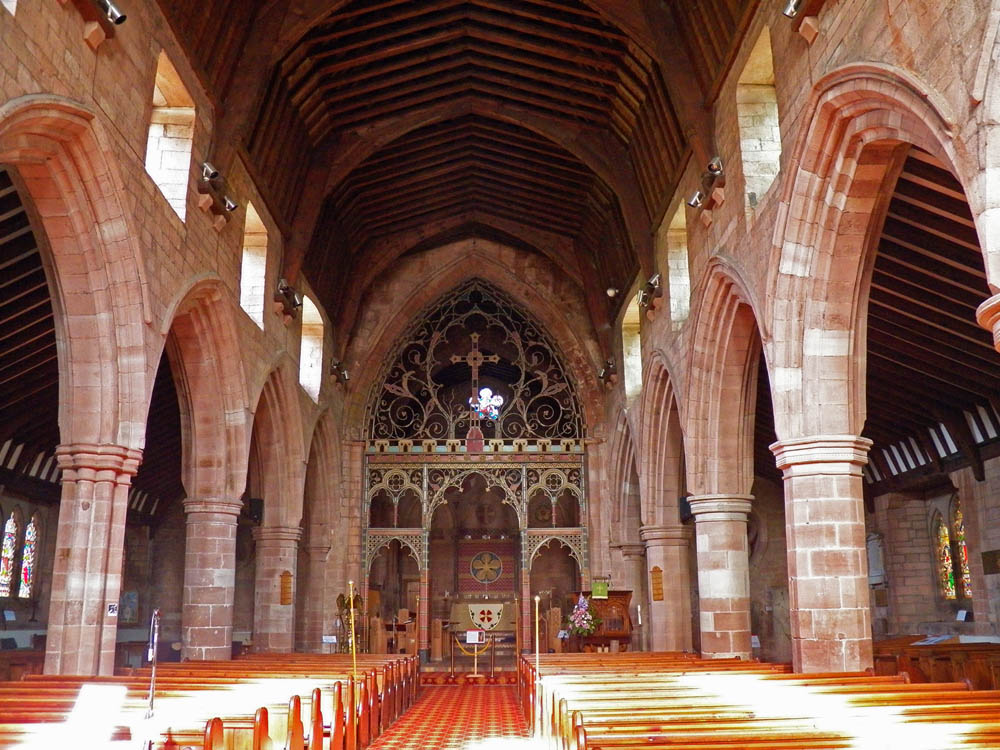
The nave, showing the wrought-iron screen by William Butterfield

All the church buildings that were in use at the time of the Dissolution are still standing and in use by the parish. However, nothing remains of the domestic buildings of the monks.

The Norman west doorway of the priory dates from 1150 to 1160, and is the most richly decorated in the county, with three orders of columns, zig-zag (chevron) ornamentations, and beak-head decorations. Opposite in the west courtyard is a fine Romanesque lintel, which may have served an earlier church, dating from circa 1120. The six nave arcades are Early English arches sitting on the original Norman pillars. The base of the tower is Norman but the arches are Early English. The east wall of the north transept has plain Norman windows above the chapel altar, and there is a fine Norman window on the north side of the present chancel, though with Victorian plate tracery. The St Bega chapel in the north transept has two fine Norman windows above the altar. Flanking the altar are the two sculptures of St Bega and the Virgin Mary by Josefina de Vasconcellos which make up the "Vision of St Bega" (1950). In the 19th century two large cinquefoil openings were inserted by Butterfield into the medieval east walls of the transepts. The side aisles are a Victorian restoration down to the string course.

At the east end, beyond the present chancel wall built by Butterfield, is the monastic chancel of about 1190, still almost complete, with a fine range of lancet windows on the north side and an arcade of arches (now infilled and with modern windows) on the south side, which would have led to the 14th-century chapel in the chancel aisle. The monastic chancel is currently separated from the body of the church by the altar wall, though there is a modern connecting doorway. It is currently used as a parish room. Beneath the elevated wooden floor of the present building is the original stone floor of the medieval church.

Outside to the south of the chancel are the remains of the chapel built 1270–1300, which may have fallen due to structural problems before the Dissolution. In the ruined fragment of the south wall can be seen the top steps of the monks' night stairs and a squint window, while to the east all that remains of a window is its north jamb.

== St Bees Man ==
During an archaeological dig in 1981 in the area of the 14th-century ruined chapel at the east end, a number of medieval burials were uncovered, and the remains of an earlier building on a different alignment to the priory was found. The most significant find was of a man aged 35–45 in a lead coffin in a stone vault, given the name St Bees Man, whose body was well-preserved. It has now been determined with a high degree of probability that he was Anthony de Lucy, a knight, who died in 1368 in the Teutonic Crusades in Prussia. Although the body was about six hundred years old, his nails, skin and stomach contents were found to be in near-perfect condition. After his death the vault was enlarged to take the body of his sister, Maud de Lucy, who died in 1398. The probable effigies of both Maud and Anthony can be seen in the extensive history display in the priory, which includes the shroud in which he was wrapped.

== Gallery ==
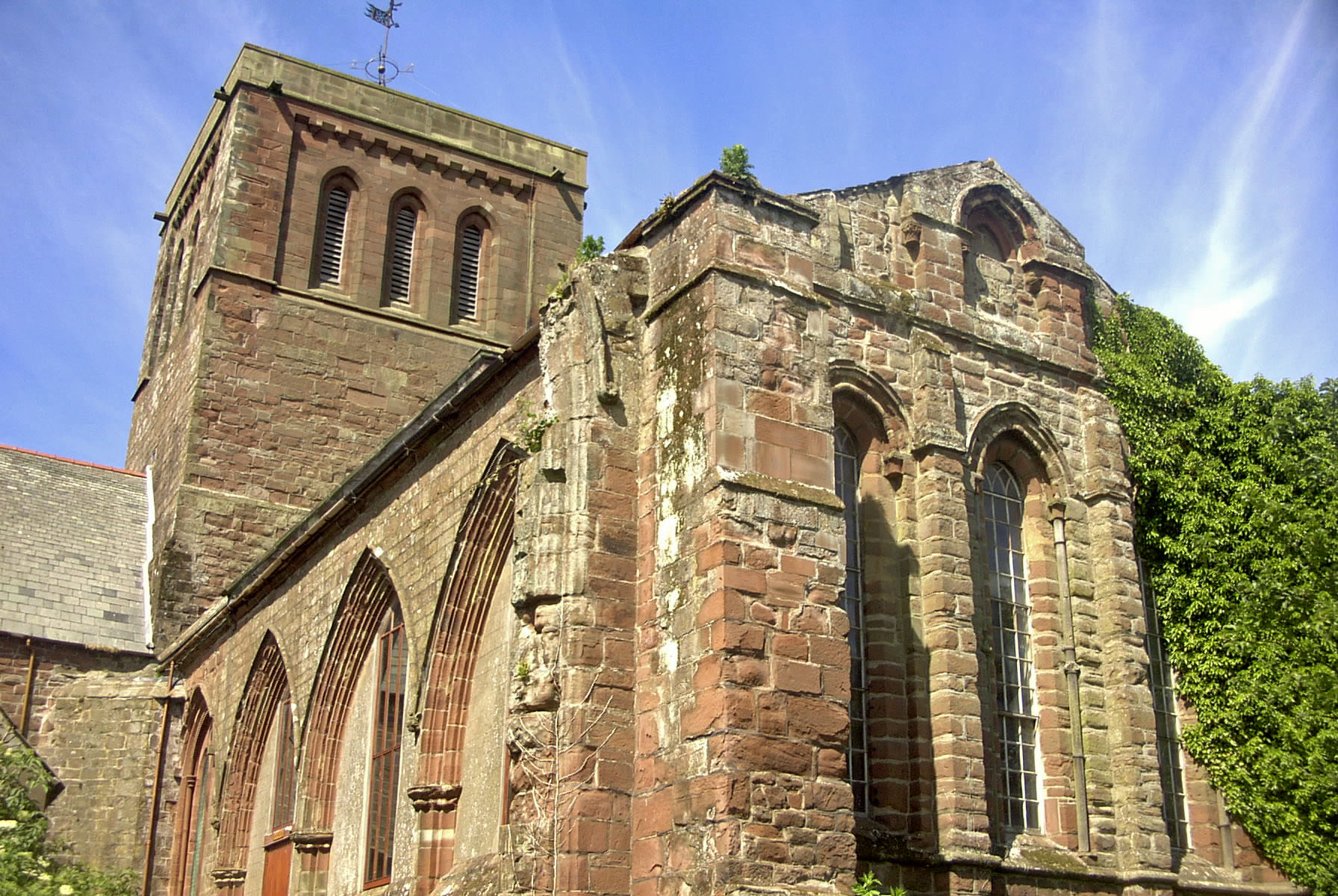
The late 12th-century monastic chancel

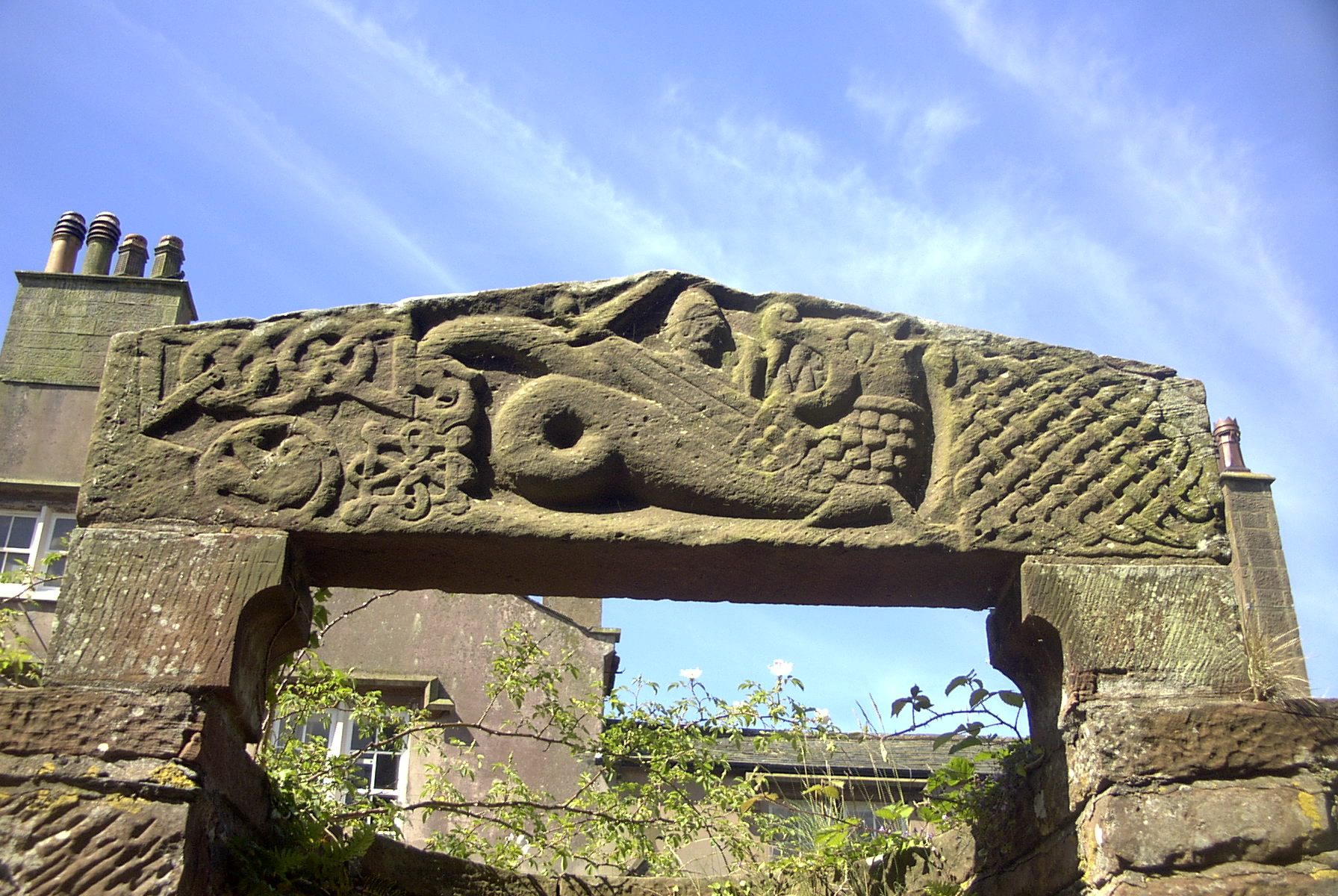
Romanesque lintel circa 1120, showing St Michael fighting a dragon

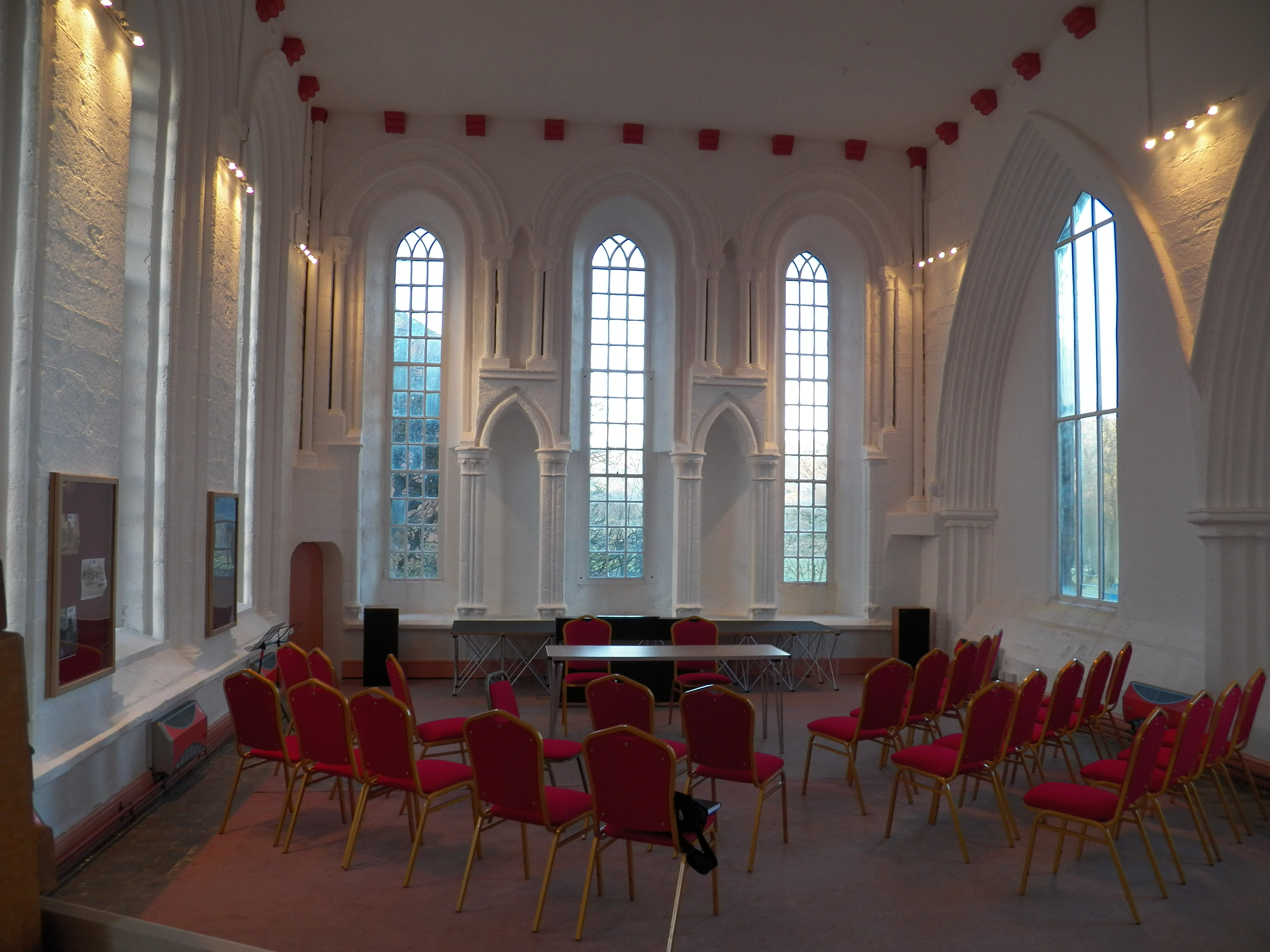
Interior – the restored monastic chancel, now a parish room

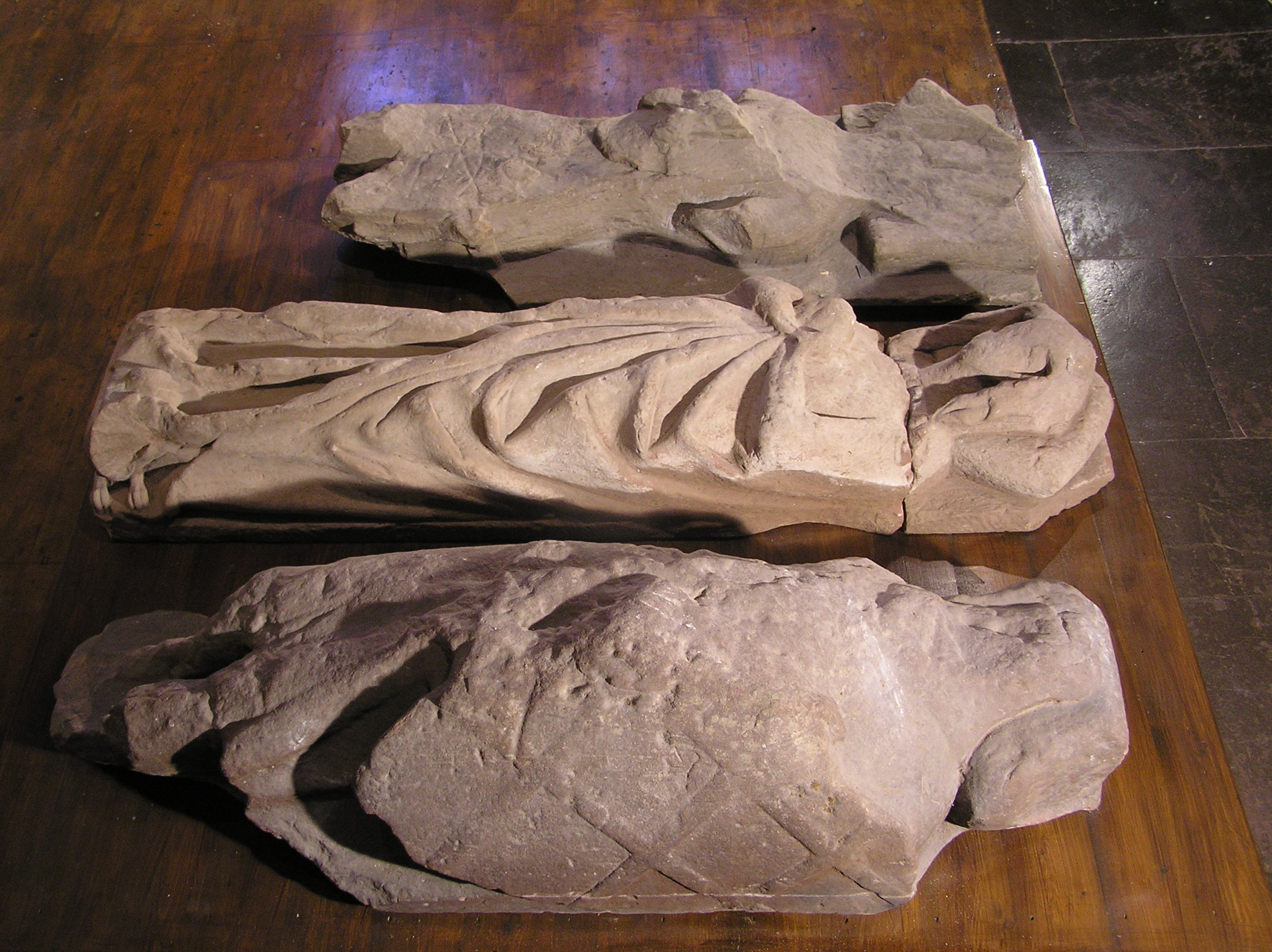
Medieval effigies. Top: thought to be Anthony de Lucy. Middle: Maud de Lucy. Bottom: possibly Robert de Harington.

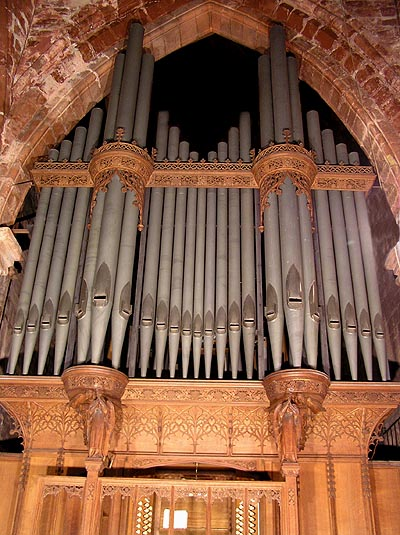
The famous pipe organ by Henry Willis

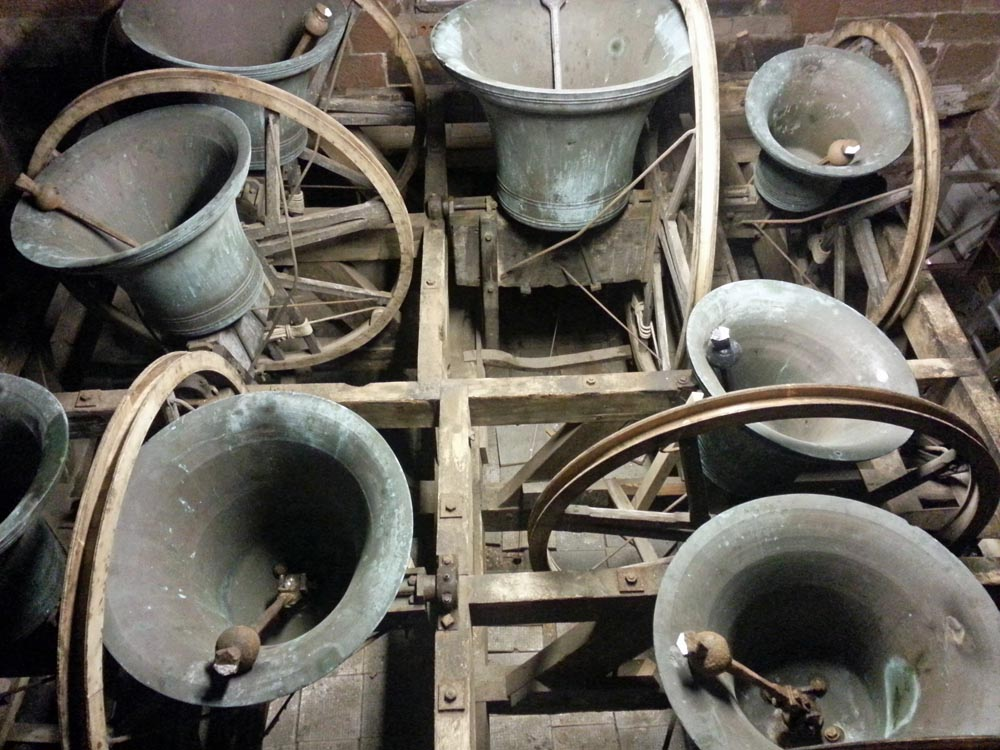
The priory's 8 bells shown in the "up" position

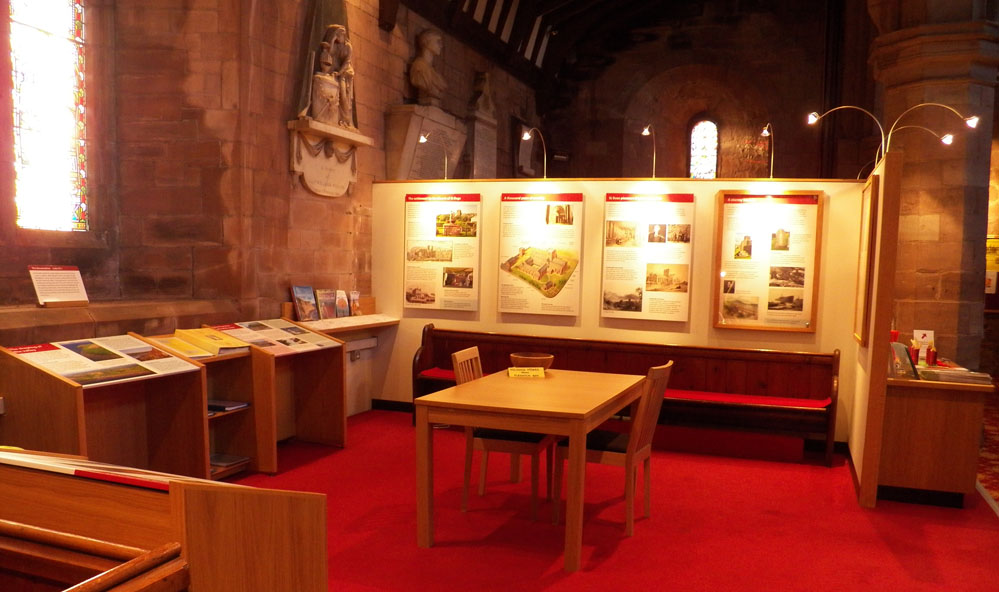
Historical information and study area

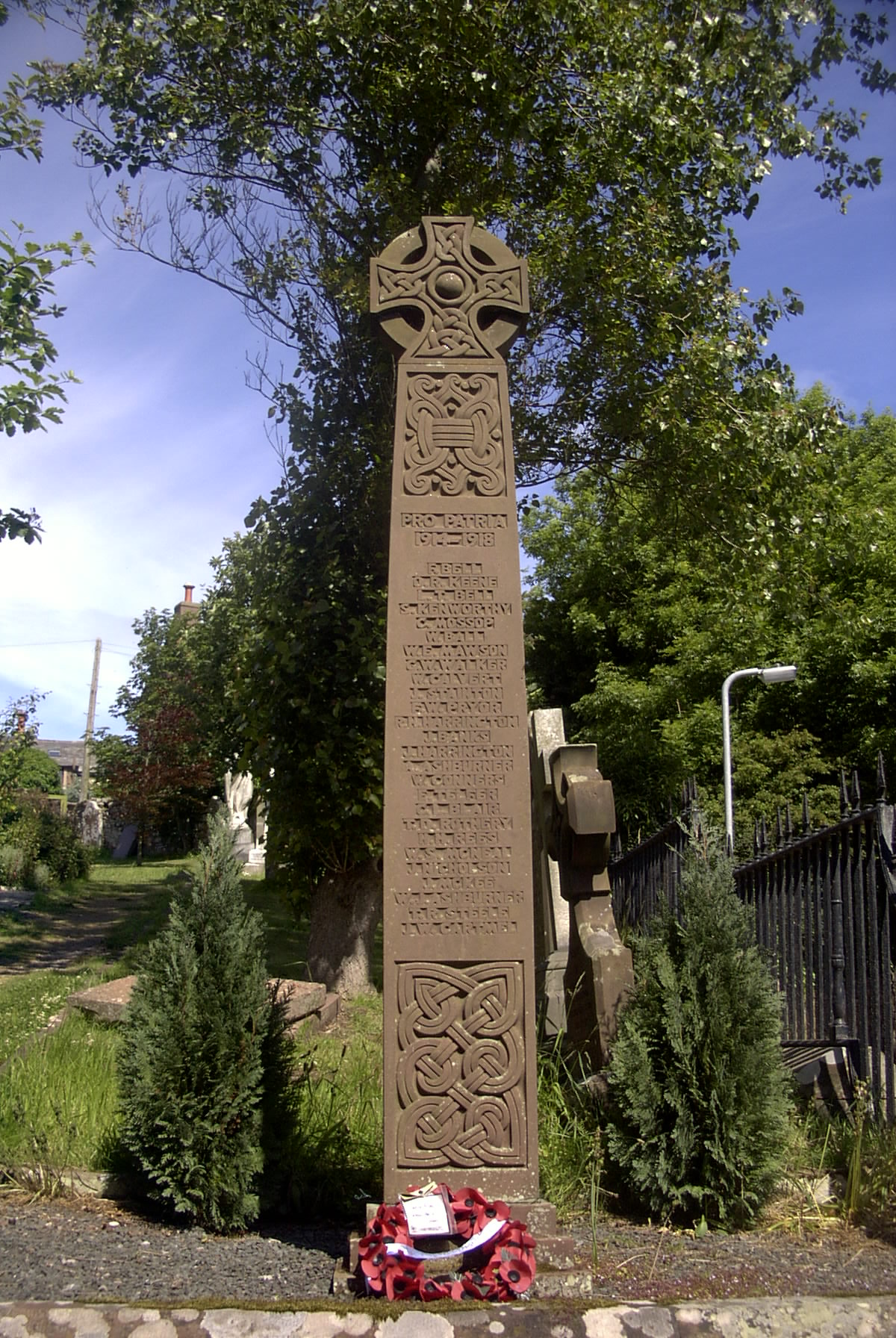
St Bees graveyard war memorial, designed by W. G. Collingwood

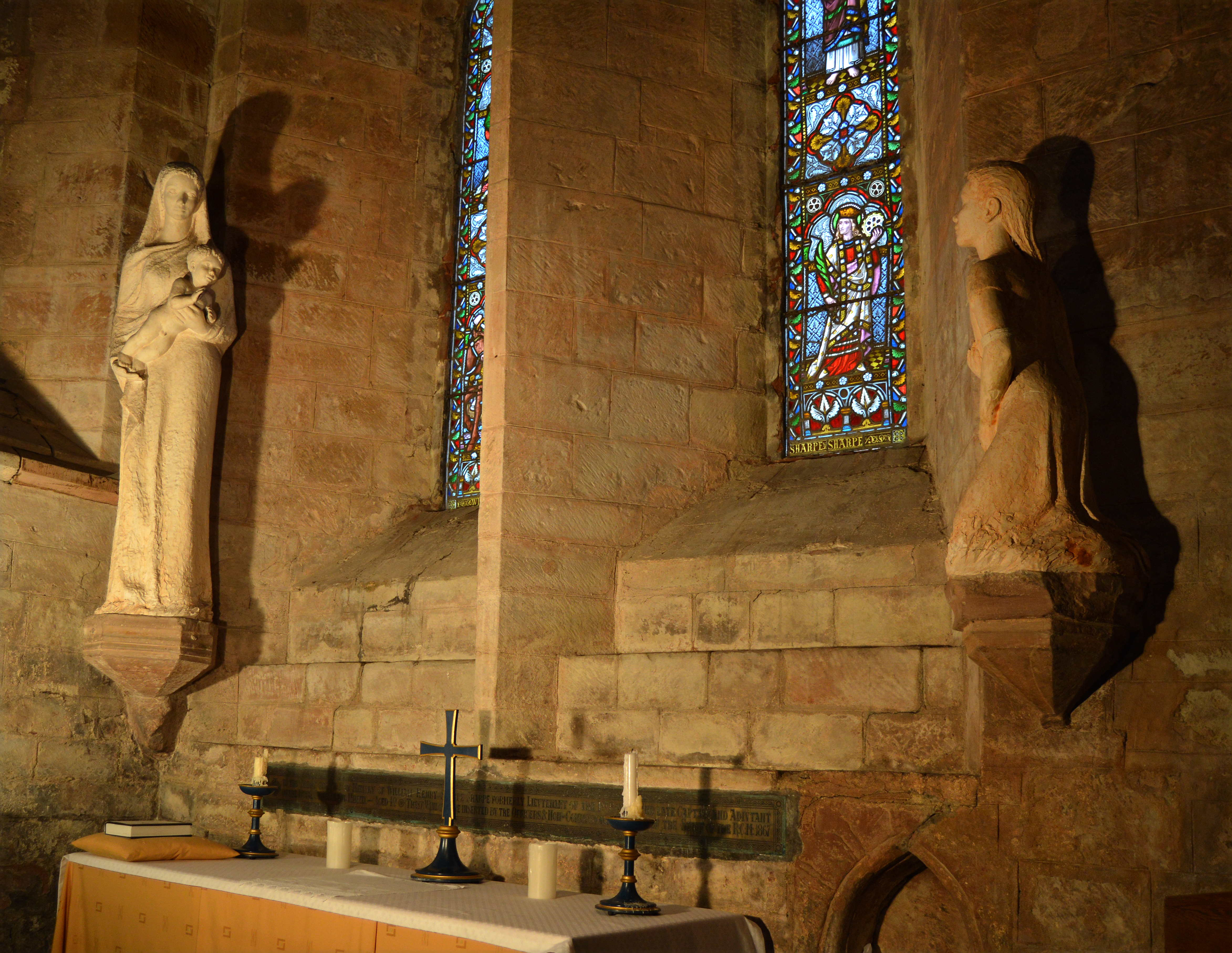
Vision of St Bega by Josefina de Vasconcellos

== See also ==
- List of monastic houses in Cumbria
- Grade I listed churches in Cumbria
- Grade I listed buildings in Cumbria
- Listed buildings in St Bees
- List of English abbeys, priories and friaries serving as parish churches
- Josefina de Vasconcellos
- Richard Parkinson (priest)
