= Duke of Cornwall =

Title in the Peerage of England

Dukedom of Cornwall
- Arms of the Duke of Cornwall
- Creation date: 1337 (first creation); 1376 (second creation); 1460 (third creation)
- Created by: Edward III (first creation); Edward III (second creation); Henry VI (third creation)
- Peerage: Peerage of England
- First holder: Edward of Woodstock
- Present holder: William, Prince of Wales
- Extinction date: 1377 (second creation); 1460 (third creation)
- Former seat: Restormel Castle
- Motto: Middle Low German: Houmout, lit. 'High-spirited'

Duke of Cornwall (Cornish: Duk a Gernow) is a title in the Peerage of England, traditionally held by the eldest son of the reigning British monarch, previously the English monarch. The Duchy of Cornwall was the first duchy created in England and was established in a royal charter in 1337 by King Edward III. In 2022, Prince William became Duke of Cornwall with the accession to the throne of his father, King Charles III; William's wife, Catherine, became Duchess of Cornwall.

== Legend ==
Some folk histories of the British Isles, such as Geoffrey of Monmouth's History of the Kings of Britain (1136), claim that the first leader of Cornwall was Corineus, a Trojan warrior and ally of Brutus of Troy, portrayed as the original settler of the British Isles. From then through the Arthurian period, such legendary dukes of Cornwall stood apart from the high king of Britain, while serving as his closest ally and, at times, as his protector (all per Monmouth's collected yarns). Notably in this tale, Gorlois, duke of Cornwall under King Uther Pendragon, rebelled when the king became obsessed with Gorlois' wife Igraine. Uther killed Gorlois and took Igraine: the son was King Arthur.

== History ==
The historical record suggests that, following the Anglo-Saxon settlement of Britain, Cornwall formed part of a separate Kingdom of Dumnonia, which included Devon, although there is evidence that it may have had its own rulers at times. The Celtic southwest of Britain was gradually conquered by the emerging Germanic Kingdom of England, and after the Norman Conquest in 1066, the new rulers of England appointed their own men as earl of Cornwall, the first of whom was in fact a Breton of Cornouaille in Brittany.

Edward of Woodstock (widely known as 'The Black Prince'), the eldest son of Edward III, was made the first duke of Cornwall in 1337, after Edward III claimed the title of King of France. Cornwall was the first dukedom conferred within the Kingdom of England.

== Succession ==
Standard of the duke

The charter that established the estate on 17 March 1337 set out the rule that the duke and possessor of the estate would be the eldest son and heir apparent of the monarch. There were some deviations from this rule until a legal case (the Prince's Case) in 1606, which held that the rule should be adhered to.

When the estate is without a duke, the possessor is the monarch, even if the former duke left surviving descendants. The monarch's grandson, even if he is the heir apparent, does not succeed to the dukedom. Similarly, no female may ever be duke of Cornwall, even if she is heir presumptive or heir apparent.

Under tradition, it is possible for an individual to be Prince of Wales, and heir apparent, without also holding the position of Duke of Cornwall. The title 'Prince of Wales' is the traditional title of the heir apparent to the throne, granted at the discretion of the sovereign, though not automatically, and is not restricted to the eldest son.

For example, after the death of Frederick, Prince of Wales, George II's heir apparent was his grandson George (Frederick's eldest son and the future George III). The young Prince George was created Prince of Wales but did not become Duke of Cornwall because he was the king's grandson, rather than his son. When the sovereign has no legitimate son, or when the heir apparent is not the sovereign's son, the estates of the duchy revert to the Crown until a legitimate son is born or until the accession of a new monarch who has a son.

James Francis Edward Stuart, son of James II, was born Duke of Cornwall in 1688. Although his father lost the throne, James Francis Edward was not deprived of his own titles and honours as a result of his father's deposition. Instead, from the (prevailing) Hanoverian perspective, it was as a result of his claiming his father's lost thrones that James was attainted for treason on 2 March 1702, and his titles were thus forfeited under English law. However, from the (minority) Jacobite perspective, on his father's death in 1701 the duchy was merged with the Crown.

== Rights of the duke ==
The duchy includes over 220 square miles (570 square kilometres) of land, more than half of which lies in Devon. The duke has the right to the estates of all those who die without named heirs (bona vacantia) in Cornwall, and also appoints the High Sheriff of Cornwall; in most of England and Wales the Crown has these rights, the other exception being the Duchy of Lancaster, a private estate held in trust for the sovereign. The duke having these rights has contributed to the debate over the constitutional status of Cornwall.

In 2013, the duchy had a revenue surplus of £19 million, a sum that was exempt from income tax, though Prince Charles, the duke, chose to pay the tax voluntarily. Until 2011, if there was no Duke of Cornwall the income of the duchy went to the Crown. Under the Sovereign Grant Act 2011, revenues of the duchy now pass to the heir to the throne regardless of whether or not they are Duke of Cornwall. When the heir is a minor, 10% of revenues pass to them, with the balance passing to the Crown; the Sovereign Grant is reduced by the same amount.

== Arms ==
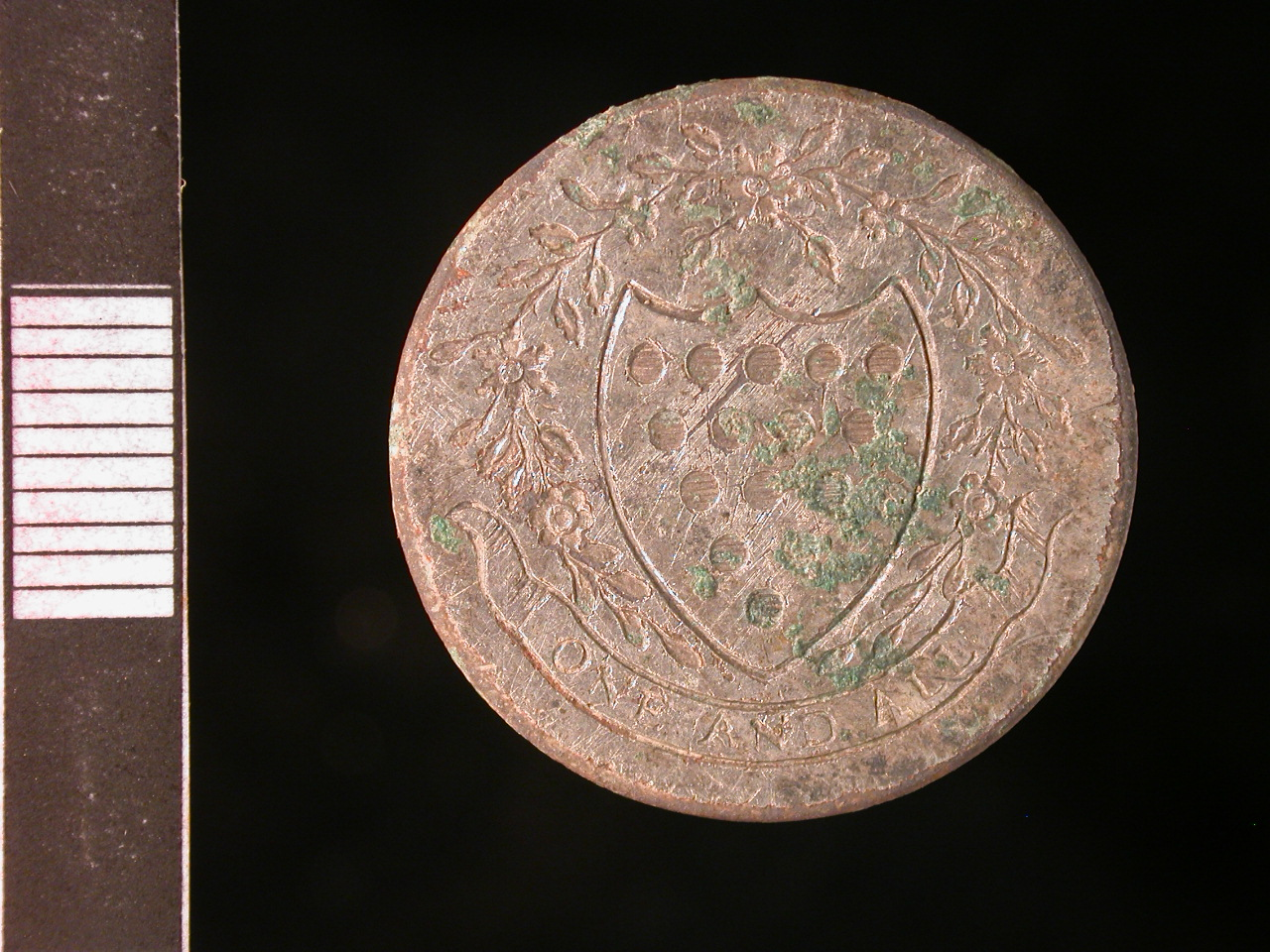
Silver-plated cast copper alloy button with incised coat of arms of the Duke of Cornwall (c. 1775)

The coat of arms of the duke of Cornwall is blazoned as sable, fifteen bezants, that is, a black field bearing fifteen golden discs. The arms are now used as a badge by the prince of Wales, and they appear below the shield in his coat of arms, along with his other badges.

The arms were adopted late in the 15th century, based on the arms of Richard, Earl of Cornwall. The bezants in Richard's arms were intended to represent peas, known in French as pois, as a punning reference to the French region of Poitou, of which he was count.

On 21 June 1968 a royal warrant augmented the aforementioned arms with the heir apparent's coronet, which consists of four crosses patée and four fleurs-de-lises with one arch (used only by the prince of Wales). The supporters are two Cornish choughs, each supporting an ostrich feather. The motto used with the arms is Middle Low German: Houmout, meaning "high-spirited" in Middle Low German, the personal motto of the Black Prince.

Coat of arms of Duke of Cornwall
Notes The shield has been in use since around the 15th century and was based on the arms of Richard of Cornwall (1209–1272). Adopted Granted by Royal Warrant on 21 June 1968 Coronet The heraldic shield is ensigned with the Heir Apparent's coronet. Escutcheon Sable, fifteen bezants, five, four, three, two, one. Supporters On either side, a Cornish chough proper supporting an ostrich feather Argent, penned Or. Motto Houmont or Houmout (Middle Low German for "high-spirited")

== Dukes of Cornwall, 1337 creation ==
All dukes of Cornwall who have been the eldest living son of the sovereign are generally considered to have held the same creation of the dukedom. The following is a table of these dukes of Cornwall, with the processes by which they became duke and by which they ceased to hold the title:

Duke of Cornwall	Monarch	From	To	Other title held while Duke
Edward of Woodstock	Edward III	1337 (Parliament)	1376 (death)	Prince of Wales (1343), Prince of Aquitaine (1362–1372), Earl of Chester (1333)
Henry of Monmouth	Henry IV	1399 (Parliament)	1413 (acceded as Henry V)	Prince of Wales and Earl of Chester (1399), Duke of Aquitaine (1390), Duke of Lancaster (1399)
Henry of Windsor	Henry V	1421 (birth)	1422 (acceded as Henry VI)	Duke of Aquitaine (1421)
Edward of Westminster	Henry VI	1454 (charter)	1471 (death)	Prince of Wales and Earl of Chester (1454)
Edward of York	Edward IV	1471 (charter)	1483 (acceded as Edward V)	Prince of Wales and Earl of Chester (1471), Earl of March (1479), Earl of Pembroke (1479)
Edward of Middleham	Richard III	1483 (father's accession)	1484 (death)	Prince of Wales and Earl of Chester (1483), Earl of Salisbury (1478)
Arthur Tudor	Henry VII	1486 (birth)	1502 (death)	Prince of Wales and Earl of Chester (1489)
Henry Tudor	Henry VII	1502 (death of older brother)	1509 (acceded as Henry VIII)	Prince of Wales and Earl of Chester (1504), Duke of York (1494)
Henry Tudor	Henry VIII	1511 (birth)	1511 (death)	
Edward Tudor	Henry VIII	1537 (birth)	1547 (acceded as Edward VI)	Prince of Wales and Earl of Chester (1537)
Henry Frederick Stuart	James I	1603 (father's accession)	1612 (death)	Prince of Wales and Earl of Chester (1610), Duke of Rothesay, Earl of Carrick and Baron of Renfrew (1469), Lord of the Isles (1540), Prince and Great Steward of Scotland (1469); The italicised henceforth "Duke of Rothesay, etc (1469 & 1540)"
Charles Stuart	James I	1612 (death of older brother)	1625 (acceded as Charles I)	Prince of Wales and Earl of Chester (1616), Duke of Rothesay, etc. (1469 & 1540), Duke of Albany (1600), Duke of York (1605), Marquess of Ormond, Earl of Ross, Lord Ardmannoch (1600)
Charles James Stuart	Charles I	1629 (birth)	1629 (death)	Duke of Rothesay, etc. (1469 & 1540)
Charles Stuart	Charles I	1630 (birth)	1649 (acceded as Charles II)	Prince of Wales and Earl of Chester (1638), Duke of Rothesay, etc. (1469 & 1540)
James Francis Edward Stuart ("The Old Pretender")	James II	1688 (birth)	1702 (attainted)	Prince of Wales and Earl of Chester (1688–1702), Duke of Rothesay, etc. (1469–1702 & 1540–1702)
George Augustus	George I	1714 (father's accession)	1727 (acceded as George II)	Prince of Wales and Earl of Chester (1714), Hereditary Elector of Hanover, Duke of Rothesay, etc. (1469 & 1540), Duke of Cambridge, Marquess of Cambridge, Earl of Milford Haven, Viscount Northallerton, Baron Tewkesbury (1706)
Frederick Louis	George II	1727 (father's accession)	1751 (death)	Prince of Wales and Earl of Chester (1729), Duke of Rothesay, etc. (1469 & 1540), Duke of Edinburgh, Marquess of Ely, Earl of Eltham, Viscount Launceston, Baron Snowdon (1726)
George Augustus Frederick	George III	1762 (birth)	1820 (acceded as George IV)	Prince of Wales and Earl of Chester (1762), Duke of Rothesay, etc. (1469 & 1540)
Albert Edward	Victoria	1841 (birth)	1901 (acceded as Edward VII)	Prince of Wales and Earl of Chester (1841), Duke of Rothesay, etc. (1469 & 1540), Earl of Dublin (1850)
George Frederick Ernest Albert	Edward VII	1901 (father's accession)	1910 (acceded as George V)	Prince of Wales and Earl of Chester (1901), Duke of Rothesay, etc. (1469 & 1540), Duke of York, Earl of Inverness, Baron Killarney (1892)
Edward Albert Christian George Andrew Patrick David	George V	1910 (father's accession)	1936 (acceded as Edward VIII)	Prince of Wales and Earl of Chester (1910), Duke of Rothesay, etc. (1469 & 1540)
Charles Philip Arthur George	Elizabeth II	1952 (mother's accession)	2022 (acceded as Charles III)	Prince of Wales and Earl of Chester (1958), Duke of Rothesay, etc. (1469 & 1540), Duke of Edinburgh, Earl of Merioneth and Baron Greenwich (1947)
William Arthur Philip Louis	Charles III	2022 (father's accession)	Incumbent	Prince of Wales and Earl of Chester (2022), Duke of Rothesay, etc. (1469 & 1540), Duke of Cambridge, Earl of Strathearn, Baron Carrickfergus (2011)

== Dukes of Cornwall, 1376 creation ==
When his heir apparent, Edward the Black Prince, predeceased him, Edward III granted a new creation of the title 'duke of Cornwall' to his grandson, Richard. When he acceded to the throne as Richard II in 1377, this creation merged with the Crown.

- Richard of Bordeaux (1367–1400)

also Prince of Wales and Earl of Chester (1376)

== Dukes of Cornwall, 1460 creation ==
When Richard Plantagenet, Duke of York, pressed his claim to the throne, he was made heir apparent to Henry VI by the Act of Accord. On 31 October 1460, he was made prince of Wales and earl of Chester, duke of Cornwall and Lord Protector of England. Since he was not the eldest living son of the monarch, this creation was outside the terms of the 1337 warrant; York died in battle two months later, on 30 December 1460.

- Richard Plantagenet (1411–1460)

also Lord Protector of England, Prince of Wales and Earl of Chester (1460, see Act of Accord); Duke of York (1385), Earl of Ulster (1264), Earl of March (1328), Earl of Cambridge (1414, restored 1426), feudal Lord of Clare (bt. 1066–1075), Baron Mortimer of Wigmore (1331)

== Jacobite duke ==
Charles Edward Stuart ('The Young Pretender'), eldest son and heir apparent of James Francis Edward Stuart ('The Old Pretender'), was born in Rome on 31 December 1720, and shortly after his birth, he was declared prince of Wales, duke of Cornwall and earl of Chester in the Jacobite succession. With the death of the Old Pretender on 1 January 1766, he acceded to his father's claim to be King of England, Scotland, France, and Ireland. He died on 31 January 1788.

== Family tree ==
Family tree of the Princes of Wales, Dukes of Cornwall, Dukes of Rothesay, Earls of Carrick and Earls of Chester

Earl of Chester (1st creation), 1067–1070
Gerbod the Fleming (?); Earl of Chester	Richard Goz (d. after 1082)	King William I (c. 1028–1087)
Earldom of Chester (1st creation) forfeit, 1071
Earl of Chester (2nd creation), 1071
Maud (Margaret)	Hugh d'Avranches (c. 1047–1101); 1st Earl of Chester	Adela of Normandy (c. 1067–1137)	Stephen, Count of Blois (c. 1045–1102)	King Henry I (c. 1068–1135)
Ranulf le Meschin (1070–1129); 3rd Earl of Chester	Richard d'Avranches (1094–1120); 2nd Earl of Chester	Lucia-Mahaut (d. 1120)	Robert Rufus (c. 1090–1147); Earl of Gloucester
Ranulf de Gernon (1099–1153); 4th Earl of Chester	Maud (Matilda) of Gloucester (d. 1189)
Hugh of Cyfeiliog (1147–1181); 5th Earl of Chester
Ranulf de Blondeville (1170–1232); 6th Earl of Chester, Earl of Lincoln	Matilda (Maud) (1171–1233); Countess of Chester suo jure
Earl of Chester (4th creation), 1264
John of Scotland (c. 1207–1237); 7th Earl of Chester, Earl of Huntingdon	Simon de Montfort (1208–1265); Earl of Chester, Earl of Leicester
Earldom of Chester (2nd creation) reverted to the crown, 1237	Earl of Chester (3rd creation), 1254	Earldom of Chester (4th creation) forfeit, 1265
Edward, Lord of Chester (1239–1307); Earl of Chester (without the title of Earl), later King Edward I
Earldom of Chester (3rd creation) reverted to the crown, 1272
Earl of Chester (5th creation), 1301
Edward of Caernarfon (1284–1327); Prince of Wales and Earl of Chester; 1301–1307, later King Edward II
Earldom of Chester (5th creation) reverted to the crown, 1307
Earl of Chester (6th creation), 1312
Robert Stewart (1316–1390); Earl of Carrick (1316–1368), later King Robert II of Scots	Edward Plantagenet (1312–1377); Earl of Chester (1312–1327), later King Edward III
Hereafter, the Earldom of Chester was created in conjunction with the Principality of Wales.
Duke of Cornwall, 1337
John Stewart (1337–1406); Earl of Carrick (1368–1390), later King Robert III of Scots	Edward the Black Prince (1330–1376); Duke of Cornwall (1337–1376), Prince of Wales (1343–1376)	John of Gaunt (1340–1399); Duke of Lancaster	Lionel of Antwerp (1338–1368); Duke of Clarence	Edmund of Langley (1341–1402); Duke of York
Dukedom of Cornwall extinct, 1376
Duke of Cornwall, 1376
Richard of Bordeaux (1367–1400); Prince of Wales (1376–1377), Duke of Cornwall (1376–1377), later King Richard II	John Beaufort (c. 1371–1410)	King Henry IV (1366–1413)	Philippa of Clarence (1355–1382)
Dukedom of Cornwall merged in the Crown, 1377
Roger Mortimer (1374–1398)
Duke of Rothesay created, 1398	Duke of Cornwall restored, 1399
David Stewart (1378–1402); Earl of Carrick (1390–1402); Duke of Rothesay (1398–1402)	Henry of Monmouth (1386–1422); Prince of Wales (1399–1413), Duke of Cornwall (1399–1413), later King Henry V	Anne de Mortimer (1390–1411)	Richard of Conisburgh (c. 1375–1415); Earl of Cambridge
Duke of Cornwall, 1460
James (1394–1437); Earl of Carrick (1402–1406); Duke of Rothesay (1404–1406), later King James I of Scots	Joan Beaufort (c. 1404–1445)	John Beaufort (1404–1444); Duke of Somerset	Henry (1421–1471); Duke of Cornwall (1421–1422), later King Henry VI	Richard Plantagenet (1411–1460); Duke of York; Prince of Wales (1460), Duke of Cornwall (1460)
Alexander Stewart (1430); Duke of Rothesay (1430)	James (1430–1460); Duke of Rothesay (1431–1437), later King James II of Scots	Margaret Beaufort (1443–1509)	King Edward IV (1442–1483)	King Richard III (1452–1485)
James (1451–1488); Duke of Rothesay (1452–1460), later King James III of Scots	King Henry VII (1457–1509)	Edward of Westminster (1453–1471); Prince of Wales (1454–1471), Duke of Cornwall (1454–1471)
From the 1469 Act of Scottish Parliament, the Earldom of Carrick and the Dukedom of Rothesay was to be automatically held by the "first-born Prince of the King of Scots."
James (1473–1513); Duke of Rothesay (1473–1488), later King James IV of Scots	Margaret Tudor (1489–1541)	Arthur Tudor (1486–1502); Prince of Wales (1489–1502), Duke of Cornwall (1486–1502)	Henry Tudor (1491–1547); Prince of Wales (1504–1509), Duke of Cornwall (1502–1509), later King Henry VIII	Edward (1470–1483); Prince of Wales (1471–1483), Duke of Cornwall (1471–1483), later King Edward V	Edward of Middleham (c. 1473–1484); Prince of Wales (1483–1484), Duke of Cornwall (1483–1484)
James Stewart (1507–1508); Duke of Rothesay (1507–1508)	Arthur Stewart (1509–1510); Duke of Rothesay (1509–1510)	James (1512–1542); Duke of Rothesay (1512–1513), later King James V of Scots	Henry (1511); Duke of Cornwall (1511)	Edward Tudor (1537–1553); Prince of Wales (1537–1547), Duke of Cornwall (1537–1547), later King Edward VI
James Stewart (1540–1541); Duke of Rothesay (1540–1541)	Mary, Queen of Scots (1542–1587)
James Charles Stuart (1566–1625); Duke of Rothesay (1566–1567), later King James VI/I
Henry Frederick Stuart (1594–1612); Prince of Wales (1610–1612), Duke of Cornwall (1603–1612), Duke of Rothesay (1594–1612)	Elizabeth Stuart (1596–1662)	Charles Stuart (1600–1649); Prince of Wales (1616–1625), Duke of Cornwall (1612–1625), Duke of Rothesay (1612–1625), later King Charles I
Sophia of Hanover (1630–1714)	Charles James (1629); Duke of Cornwall (1629), Duke of Rothesay (1629), styled Prince of Wales	Charles Stuart (1630–1685); Prince of Wales (c. 1638/1641–1649), Duke of Cornwall (1630–1649), Duke of Rothesay (1630–1649), later King Charles II	King James II/VII (1633–1701)
King George I (1660–1727)
George Augustus (1683–1760); Prince of Wales (1714–1727), Duke of Cornwall (1714–1727), Duke of Rothesay (1714–1727), later King George II	James Francis Edward Stuart (1688–1766); Prince of Wales (c. 1688–1688), Duke of Cornwall (1688–1702), Duke of Rothesay (1688–1702)
Frederick Louis (1707–1751); Prince of Wales (1729–1751), Duke of Cornwall (1727–1751), Duke of Rothesay (1727–1751)
George William Frederick (1738–1820); Prince of Wales (1751–1760), later King George III
George Augustus Frederick (1762–1830); Prince of Wales (1762–1820), Duke of Cornwall (1762–1820), Duke of Rothesay (1762–1820), later King George IV	Edward Augustus (1767–1820); Duke of Kent and Strathearn
Queen Victoria (1819–1901)
Albert Edward (1841–1910); Prince of Wales (1841–1901), Duke of Cornwall (1841–1901), Duke of Rothesay (1841–1901), later King Edward VII
George Frederick Ernest Albert (1865–1936); Prince of Wales (1901–1910), Duke of Cornwall (1901–1910), Duke of Rothesay (1901–1910), later King George V
Edward Albert Christian George Andrew Patrick David (1894–1972); Prince of Wales (1910–1936), Duke of Cornwall (1910–1936), Duke of Rothesay (1910–1936), later King Edward VIII, later Duke of Windsor	King George VI (1895–1952)
Queen Elizabeth II (1926–2022)
Charles Philip Arthur George (b. 1948); Prince of Wales (1958–2022), Duke of Cornwall (1952–2022), Duke of Rothesay (1952–2022), later King Charles III
William Arthur Philip Louis (b. 1982); Prince of Wales (since 2022), Duke of Cornwall (since 2022), Duke of Rothesay (since 2022), Duke of Cambridge
Prince George of Wales (b. 2013)

== Dukes of Cornwall in fiction ==
- Thomas Norton and Thomas Sackville's play Gorboduc includes Clotyn, the Duke of Cornwall, who allies with Gwenard, Duke of Cumberland and Mandud, Duke of Leagre, to suppress the uprising of the opportunistic Fergus, Duke of Albany in the aftermath of Gorboduc's death.
- William Shakespeare's King Lear, set in no particular century, includes as a major character the Duke of Cornwall, who is husband to Lear's middle daughter Regan.

== See also ==
- Cornish Foreshore Case (19th century arbitration about the ownership of minerals and mines under the foreshore of Cornwall)
- Duchy Originals (the duchy's organic produce brand)
- Duke of Rothesay
- Outline of Cornwall
