= Edward of Westminster, Prince of Wales =

Heir apparent of Henry VI of England (1453–1471)

Edward of Westminster
- Prince of Wales
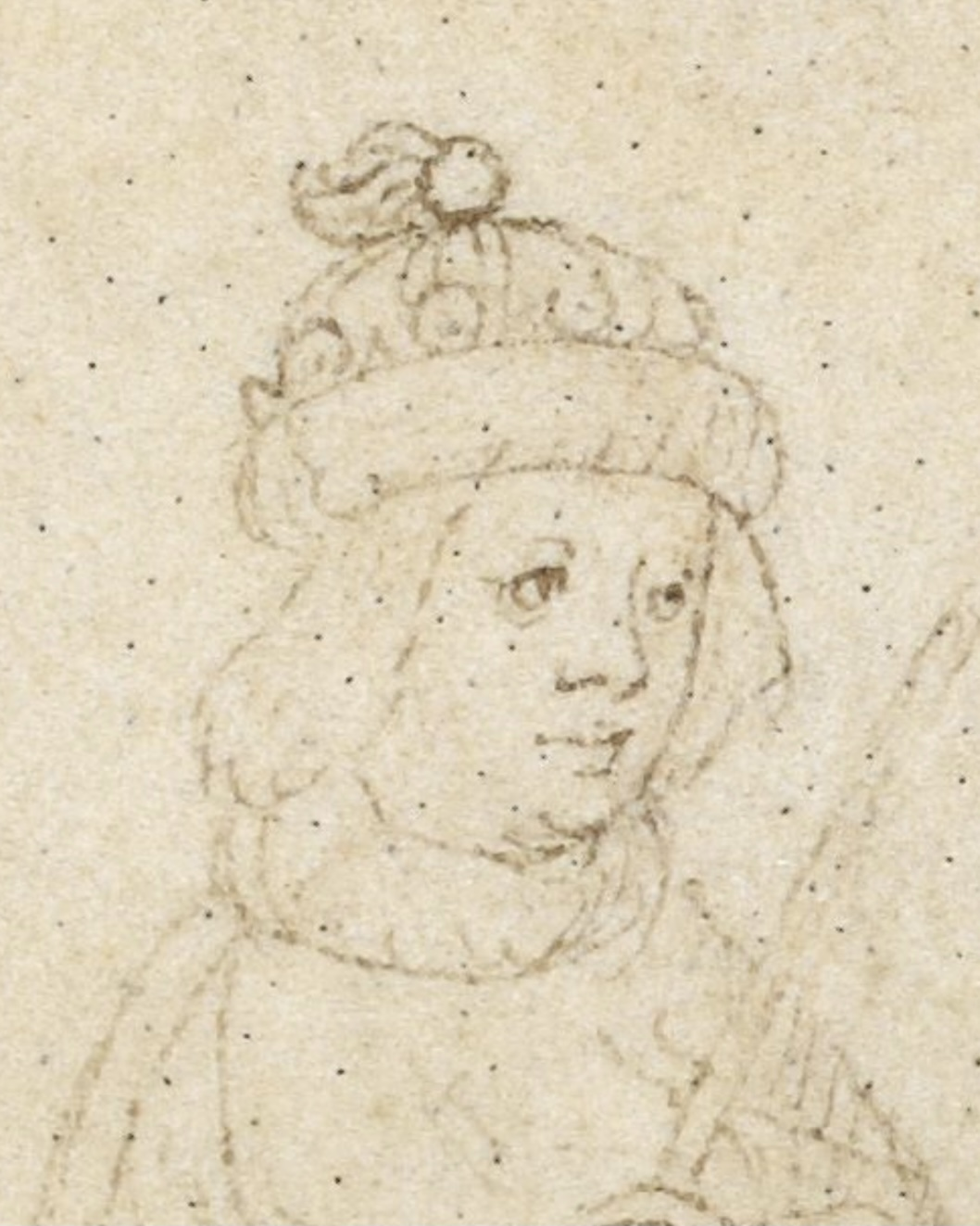
- Drawing of Edward from the Beauchamp Pageant, c. 1483–1494
- Born: 13 October 1453; Palace of Westminster, London, England
- Died: 4 May 1471 (aged 17); Tewkesbury, Gloucestershire, England
- Burial: Tewkesbury Abbey
- Spouse: Anne Neville (m. 1470)
- House: Lancaster
- Father: Henry VI of England
- Mother: Margaret of Anjou

Edward of Westminster (13 October 1453 – 4 May 1471), also known as Edward of Lancaster, was the only child of Henry VI of England and Margaret of Anjou. He was killed aged 17 at the Battle of Tewkesbury.

== Early life ==
Edward was born at the Palace of Westminster, London, the only child of Henry VI of England and his wife, Margaret of Anjou. At the time, there was strife between Henry's supporters and those of Richard of York, 3rd Duke of York, who had a claim to the throne and challenged the authority of Henry's officers of state. Henry was suffering from mental illness, and there were widespread rumours that the prince was the result of an affair between his mother and one of her loyal supporters. Edmund Beaufort, 2nd Duke of Somerset, and James Butler, 5th Earl of Ormond, were both suspected of fathering Prince Edward; however, there is no firm evidence to support the rumours, and Henry himself never doubted the boy's legitimacy and publicly acknowledged paternity. Edward was invested as Prince of Wales at Windsor Castle in 1454.

== War over the English throne ==
In 1460, Henry was captured by the supporters of the Duke of York at the Battle of Northampton and taken to London. The Duke of York was dissuaded from claiming the throne immediately, but he induced Parliament to pass the Act of Accord, by which Henry was allowed to reign but Edward was disinherited, as York or his heirs would become king on Henry's death.

Queen Margaret and Edward had meanwhile fled through Cheshire. By Margaret's later account, she induced outlaws and pillagers to aid her by pledging them to recognise the seven-year-old Edward as rightful heir to the crown. They subsequently reached safety in Wales and journeyed to Scotland, where Margaret raised support, while the Duke of York's enemies gathered in the north of England.

After York was killed at the Battle of Wakefield, the large army which Margaret had gathered advanced south. They defeated the army of Richard Neville, 16th Earl of Warwick, one of York's most prominent supporters, at the Second Battle of St Albans. Warwick had brought the captive Henry in the train of his army, and he was found abandoned on the battlefield. Two of Warwick's knights, William Bonville, 1st Baron Bonville, and Sir Thomas Kyriell, who had agreed to remain with Henry and see that he came to no harm, were captured. The day after the battle, Margaret asked Edward what death the two knights should suffer. Edward readily replied that their heads should be cut off.

== Exile in France ==
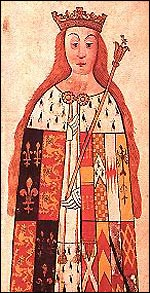
Anne Neville, wife of Edward of Westminster and later of Richard III

Margaret hesitated to advance on London with her unruly army and subsequently retreated. They were routed at the Battle of Towton a few weeks later. Margaret and Edward fled once again to Scotland. For the next three years, Margaret inspired several revolts in the northernmost counties of England, but was eventually forced to sail to France, where she and Edward maintained a court in exile. (Henry had once again been captured and was a prisoner in the Tower of London.)

In 1467 the ambassador of the Duchy of Milan to the court of France wrote that Edward "already talks of nothing but cutting off heads or making war, as if he had everything in his hands or was the god of battle or the peaceful occupant of that throne."

After several years in exile, Margaret took the best opportunity that presented itself and allied herself with the renegade Earl of Warwick. Louis XI of France wanted to start a war with Burgundy, allies of the Yorkist Edward IV. He believed that if he allied himself with restoring Lancastrian rule, they would help him conquer Burgundy. As a compliment to his new allies, Louis made young Edward godfather to his son Charles. Prince Edward was married to Anne Neville, Warwick's younger daughter, in December 1470, though there is some doubt as to whether the marriage was ever consummated.

== Battles of Barnet and Tewkesbury ==
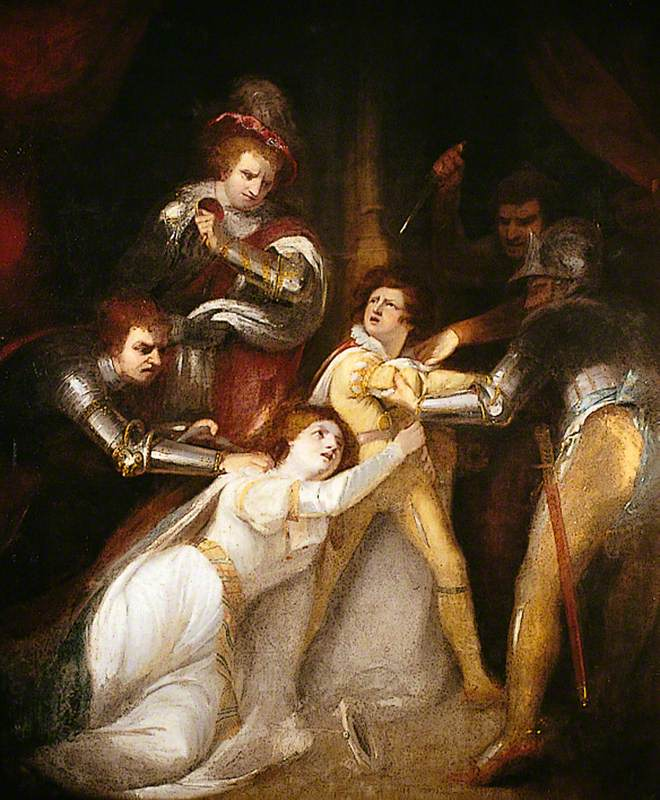
Painting by James Northcote of the murder of Edward, though sources of the time say he died in battle.

Warwick returned to England and deposed Edward IV, with the help of Edward IV's younger brother, the Duke of Clarence. Edward IV fled into exile to Burgundy with his youngest brother the Duke of Gloucester, while Warwick restored Henry VI to the throne. Prince Edward and Margaret lingered behind in France until April 1471. However, Edward IV had already raised an army, returned to England, and reconciled with Clarence. On the same day Margaret and Edward landed in England (14 April), Edward IV defeated and killed Warwick at the Battle of Barnet. With little real hope of success, the inexperienced prince and his mother led the remnant of their forces to meet Edward IV in the Battle of Tewkesbury. They were defeated, and Edward of Westminster was killed.

According to contemporary sources, Edward was overtaken and slain in the battle during the rout of the Lancastrians. An eyewitness to the battle dramatised the moment of his death in a picture which was preserved in a public library, and is described as follows: "The horse is wounded and on its knees. Then the rider receives his death blow from behind. The helmet had been struck off. The bright golden locks sink down on the horse's mane, and in another moment horse and rider fall and are ridden over."

Some accounts attribute Edward's death to his former ally, the Duke of Clarence, to whom the prince vainly appealed for help. Paul Murray Kendall, a biographer of Richard III, accepts this version of events. Another version states that Clarence and his men found the grieving prince near a grove following the battle, and immediately beheaded him on a makeshift block, despite his pleas.

Another account of Edward's death is given by three Tudor sources: The Grand Chronicle of London, Polydore Vergil, and Edward Hall. It was later dramatised by William Shakespeare in Henry VI, Part 3, Act V, scene v. Their story is that Edward was captured and brought before the victorious Edward IV and his brothers, the Duke of Clarence and the Duke of Gloucester, and his followers. The king received the prince graciously and asked him why he had taken up arms against him. The prince replied defiantly, "I came to recover my father's heritage." The king then struck the prince across his face with his gauntlet hand, whereupon Gloucester and Clarence killed the prince with their swords.

However, none of these accounts appears in any of the contemporaneous sources, which all report that Edward died in battle.

Edward's body is buried at Tewkesbury Abbey in Gloucestershire. His widow, Anne Neville, married the Duke of Gloucester, who eventually succeeded to the throne as Richard III in 1483.

== Epitaph ==
The Latin memorial brass to Edward in Tewkesbury Abbey is set in the floor between the choir stalls, under the tower. It reads as follows:

+
Hic jacet
Edwardus
princeps Wallie, crude-
liter interfectus dum adhuc juvenis
anno dñi 1471 mense maie die quarto
eheu hominum furor Matris
tu sola lux es & gregis
ultima
spes

This can be translated into English as follows:

"Here lies Edward, Prince of Wales, cruelly slain whilst but a youth. Anno Domini 1471, May fourth. Alas, the savagery of men. Thou art the sole light of thy Mother, and the last hope of thy race."

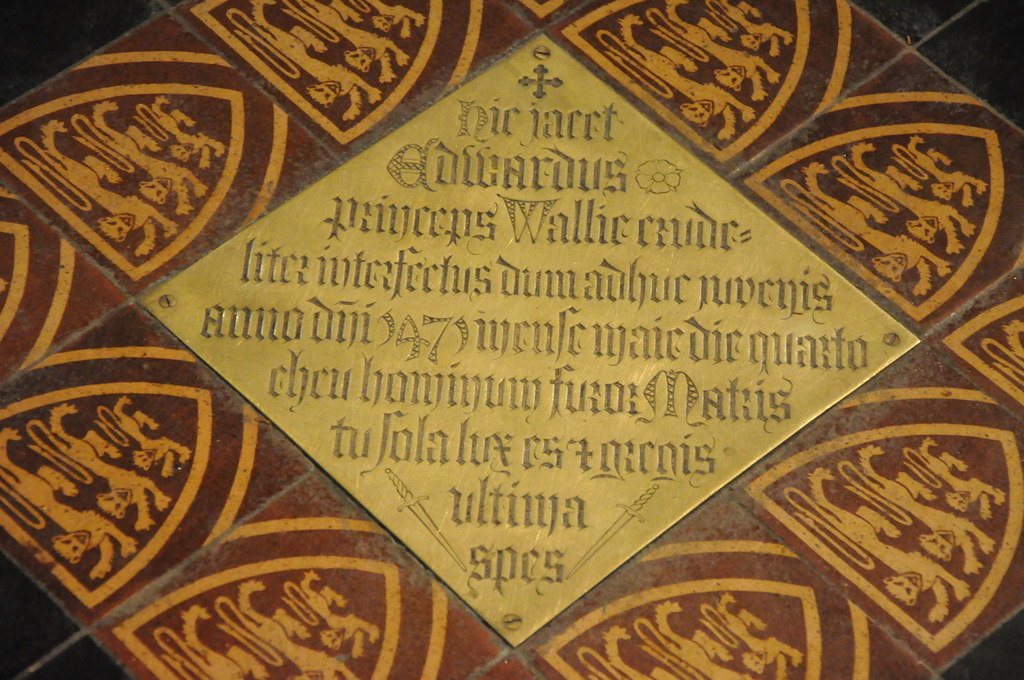
The plaque

== Ancestry and family tree ==
Ancestors of Edward of Westminster, Prince of Wales

8. Henry IV of England
4. Henry V of England
9. Mary de Bohun
2. Henry VI of England
10. Charles VI of France
5. Catherine of Valois
11. Isabeau of Bavaria
1. Edward of Westminster, Prince of Wales
12. Duke Louis II of Anjou
6. Duke René of Anjou
13. Yolande of Aragon
3. Margaret of Anjou
14. Charles II, Duke of Lorraine
7. Isabella, Duchess of Lorraine
15. Margaret of the Palatinate

Family tree of the Princes of Wales, Dukes of Cornwall, Dukes of Rothesay, Earls of Carrick and Earls of Chester

Earl of Chester (1st creation), 1067–1070
Gerbod the Fleming (?); Earl of Chester	Richard Goz (d. after 1082)	King William I (c. 1028–1087)
Earldom of Chester (1st creation) forfeit, 1071
Earl of Chester (2nd creation), 1071
Maud (Margaret)	Hugh d'Avranches (c. 1047–1101); 1st Earl of Chester	Adela of Normandy (c. 1067–1137)	Stephen, Count of Blois (c. 1045–1102)	King Henry I (c. 1068–1135)
Ranulf le Meschin (1070–1129); 3rd Earl of Chester	Richard d'Avranches (1094–1120); 2nd Earl of Chester	Lucia-Mahaut (d. 1120)	Robert Rufus (c. 1090–1147); Earl of Gloucester
Ranulf de Gernon (1099–1153); 4th Earl of Chester	Maud (Matilda) of Gloucester (d. 1189)
Hugh of Cyfeiliog (1147–1181); 5th Earl of Chester
Ranulf de Blondeville (1170–1232); 6th Earl of Chester, Earl of Lincoln	Matilda (Maud) (1171–1233); Countess of Chester suo jure
Earl of Chester (4th creation), 1264
John of Scotland (c. 1207–1237); 7th Earl of Chester, Earl of Huntingdon	Simon de Montfort (1208–1265); Earl of Chester, Earl of Leicester
Earldom of Chester (2nd creation) reverted to the crown, 1237	Earl of Chester (3rd creation), 1254	Earldom of Chester (4th creation) forfeit, 1265
Edward, Lord of Chester (1239–1307); Earl of Chester (without the title of Earl), later King Edward I
Earldom of Chester (3rd creation) reverted to the crown, 1272
Earl of Chester (5th creation), 1301
Edward of Caernarfon (1284–1327); Prince of Wales and Earl of Chester; 1301–1307, later King Edward II
Earldom of Chester (5th creation) reverted to the crown, 1307
Earl of Chester (6th creation), 1312
Robert Stewart (1316–1390); Earl of Carrick (1316–1368), later King Robert II of Scots	Edward Plantagenet (1312–1377); Earl of Chester (1312–1327), later King Edward III
Hereafter, the Earldom of Chester was created in conjunction with the Principality of Wales.
Duke of Cornwall, 1337
John Stewart (1337–1406); Earl of Carrick (1368–1390), later King Robert III of Scots	Edward the Black Prince (1330–1376); Duke of Cornwall (1337–1376), Prince of Wales (1343–1376)	John of Gaunt (1340–1399); Duke of Lancaster	Lionel of Antwerp (1338–1368); Duke of Clarence	Edmund of Langley (1341–1402); Duke of York
Dukedom of Cornwall extinct, 1376
Duke of Cornwall, 1376
Richard of Bordeaux (1367–1400); Prince of Wales (1376–1377), Duke of Cornwall (1376–1377), later King Richard II	John Beaufort (c. 1371–1410)	King Henry IV (1366–1413)	Philippa of Clarence (1355–1382)
Dukedom of Cornwall merged in the Crown, 1377
Roger Mortimer (1374–1398)
Duke of Rothesay created, 1398	Duke of Cornwall restored, 1399
David Stewart (1378–1402); Earl of Carrick (1390–1402); Duke of Rothesay (1398–1402)	Henry of Monmouth (1386–1422); Prince of Wales (1399–1413), Duke of Cornwall (1399–1413), later King Henry V	Anne de Mortimer (1390–1411)	Richard of Conisburgh (c. 1375–1415); Earl of Cambridge
Duke of Cornwall, 1460
James (1394–1437); Earl of Carrick (1402–1406); Duke of Rothesay (1404–1406), later King James I of Scots	Joan Beaufort (c. 1404–1445)	John Beaufort (1404–1444); Duke of Somerset	Henry (1421–1471); Duke of Cornwall (1421–1422), later King Henry VI	Richard Plantagenet (1411–1460); Duke of York; Prince of Wales (1460), Duke of Cornwall (1460)
Alexander Stewart (1430); Duke of Rothesay (1430)	James (1430–1460); Duke of Rothesay (1431–1437), later King James II of Scots	Margaret Beaufort (1443–1509)	King Edward IV (1442–1483)	King Richard III (1452–1485)
James (1451–1488); Duke of Rothesay (1452–1460), later King James III of Scots	King Henry VII (1457–1509)	Edward of Westminster (1453–1471); Prince of Wales (1454–1471), Duke of Cornwall (1454–1471)
From the 1469 Act of Scottish Parliament, the Earldom of Carrick and the Dukedom of Rothesay was to be automatically held by the "first-born Prince of the King of Scots."
James (1473–1513); Duke of Rothesay (1473–1488), later King James IV of Scots	Margaret Tudor (1489–1541)	Arthur Tudor (1486–1502); Prince of Wales (1489–1502), Duke of Cornwall (1486–1502)	Henry Tudor (1491–1547); Prince of Wales (1504–1509), Duke of Cornwall (1502–1509), later King Henry VIII	Edward (1470–1483); Prince of Wales (1471–1483), Duke of Cornwall (1471–1483), later King Edward V	Edward of Middleham (c. 1473–1484); Prince of Wales (1483–1484), Duke of Cornwall (1483–1484)
James Stewart (1507–1508); Duke of Rothesay (1507–1508)	Arthur Stewart (1509–1510); Duke of Rothesay (1509–1510)	James (1512–1542); Duke of Rothesay (1512–1513), later King James V of Scots	Henry (1511); Duke of Cornwall (1511)	Edward Tudor (1537–1553); Prince of Wales (1537–1547), Duke of Cornwall (1537–1547), later King Edward VI
James Stewart (1540–1541); Duke of Rothesay (1540–1541)	Mary, Queen of Scots (1542–1587)
James Charles Stuart (1566–1625); Duke of Rothesay (1566–1567), later King James VI/I
Henry Frederick Stuart (1594–1612); Prince of Wales (1610–1612), Duke of Cornwall (1603–1612), Duke of Rothesay (1594–1612)	Elizabeth Stuart (1596–1662)	Charles Stuart (1600–1649); Prince of Wales (1616–1625), Duke of Cornwall (1612–1625), Duke of Rothesay (1612–1625), later King Charles I
Sophia of Hanover (1630–1714)	Charles James (1629); Duke of Cornwall (1629), Duke of Rothesay (1629), styled Prince of Wales	Charles Stuart (1630–1685); Prince of Wales (c. 1638/1641–1649), Duke of Cornwall (1630–1649), Duke of Rothesay (1630–1649), later King Charles II	King James II/VII (1633–1701)
King George I (1660–1727)
George Augustus (1683–1760); Prince of Wales (1714–1727), Duke of Cornwall (1714–1727), Duke of Rothesay (1714–1727), later King George II	James Francis Edward Stuart (1688–1766); Prince of Wales (c. 1688–1688), Duke of Cornwall (1688–1702), Duke of Rothesay (1688–1702)
Frederick Louis (1707–1751); Prince of Wales (1729–1751), Duke of Cornwall (1727–1751), Duke of Rothesay (1727–1751)
George William Frederick (1738–1820); Prince of Wales (1751–1760), later King George III
George Augustus Frederick (1762–1830); Prince of Wales (1762–1820), Duke of Cornwall (1762–1820), Duke of Rothesay (1762–1820), later King George IV	Edward Augustus (1767–1820); Duke of Kent and Strathearn
Queen Victoria (1819–1901)
Albert Edward (1841–1910); Prince of Wales (1841–1901), Duke of Cornwall (1841–1901), Duke of Rothesay (1841–1901), later King Edward VII
George Frederick Ernest Albert (1865–1936); Prince of Wales (1901–1910), Duke of Cornwall (1901–1910), Duke of Rothesay (1901–1910), later King George V
Edward Albert Christian George Andrew Patrick David (1894–1972); Prince of Wales (1910–1936), Duke of Cornwall (1910–1936), Duke of Rothesay (1910–1936), later King Edward VIII, later Duke of Windsor	King George VI (1895–1952)
Queen Elizabeth II (1926–2022)
Charles Philip Arthur George (b. 1948); Prince of Wales (1958–2022), Duke of Cornwall (1952–2022), Duke of Rothesay (1952–2022), later King Charles III
William Arthur Philip Louis (b. 1982); Prince of Wales (since 2022), Duke of Cornwall (since 2022), Duke of Rothesay (since 2022), Duke of Cambridge
Prince George of Wales (b. 2013)

== Notes ==
Edward of Westminster, Prince of Wales House of Lancaster Cadet branch of the House of Plantagenet Born: 13 October 1453 Died: 4 May 1471
Vacant Title last held by English title: Henry of Monmouth; Welsh title: Owain Glyndwr (Pretender 1400/15)	Prince of Wales; Disputed with Richard Duke of York (Yorkist), 31 October – 30 December 1460; 1454–1471	Vacant Title next held by Edward (V)
Vacant Title last held by Henry of Windsor	Duke of Cornwall; Disputed with Richard Duke of York (Yorkist), 31 October – 30 December 1460; 1454–1471	Vacant Title next held by Edward (V)
