= William Meschin =

12th-century Anglo-Norman baron in England

William Meschin (sometimes William le Meschin; died between 1130 and 1135) was an Anglo-Norman nobleman and baron. The brother of the earl of Chester, he participated in the First Crusade. After returning to England, he acquired lands from King Henry I of England and by his marriage to an heiress. He built Egremont Castle on one parcel and with his wife funded two religious foundations. After he died, his estates were divided amongst his three daughter's descendants.

== Early life ==
Meschin was the brother of Ranulf le Meschin, the Earl of Chester. They were the sons of Ranulf de Briquessart, the viscount of the Bessin, and his wife, Matilda, the daughter of Richard le Goz, Viscount of Avranches. The boys were also nephews of Hugh d'Avranches, who had previously been Earl of Chester. There was also an older brother, Richard, who died young, and a sister, who married Robert de Grandmesnil. Meschin went on the First Crusade and was present at the siege of Nicaea in 1097.

== Land acquisition ==
The modern-day county boundaries of Cumbria (red) within England; Meschin held lands within this area.

Meschin was given Gilsland (near Carlisle) by his brother, to protect the approaches to Carlisle in Cumberland. Due to attacks by the Scots, Meschin was unable to hold it. In compensation, King Henry I of England gave him lands around Allerdale in Cumberland, which centred on Egremont. These lands comprised the lordship, or feudal barony of Egremont. (Note: This is sometimes referred to as the lordship of Coupland.) Through his wife, he acquired Skipton, and the lordship, or barony of Skipton. Besides these lands, Meschin also was awarded two escheated properties in Leicestershire, some of which had earlier been lands of Roger de Busli. Other properties in Leicestershire were previously held by Durand Malet and William Blund in the Domesday Book. Meschin also held lands in Lincolnshire and Cheshire from his brother.

Meschin built the original parts of Egremont Castle at Egremont. It was a motte-and-bailey stone castle on the River Ehen. He and his wife also founded the Augustinian priory of Embsay Priory. Katrina Legg, a historian who studied medieval monasticism, argues that Meschin's main motive for the foundation was to show support for a monastic order that enjoyed the patronage of King Henry I. Against this, Legg feels that Meschin's wife's motives were more probably religious, as she was close to Thurstan, the Archbishop of York. Another religious foundation of Meschin's was St Bees Priory, a daughter house of St Mary's Abbey, York. St Bees was founded around the same time as Embsay, Embsay was founded between 1120 and 1121; and St Bees was founded sometime after 1120.

Meschin married Cecily, daughter of Robert de Rumily. They had one son, Ranulf Meschin, and three daughters, Alice, Avice, and Matilda. Another son, Matthew, who was the eldest son, died before his parents.

== Death and legacy ==
Meschin died between 1130 and 1135. His widow married Henry de Tracy, and she died around 1151. After the death of his son Ranulf, Skipton went to Alice, who married William fitzDuncan. Alice and her first husband also acquired Egremont. After the death of fitzDuncan, Alice married Alexander fitzGerold. Avice married William de Courcy. Avice married as her second husband William Paynel, son of Ralph Paynel, as his second wife. Before 1153 Avice had married as her third husband Walter, the son of Alan de Percy. Matilda married twice – first to Philip de Belmeis and second to Hugh de Mortimer. All three daughters were the eventual co-heirs of their father, after their brother's death between 1135 and 1140. Meschin's lands were divided between their descendants, with parts ending up with the Counts of Aumale, the family of the Courcys, and the last and smallest part to the Mortimer family.
