= Duchess of Cornwall =

British royal family title

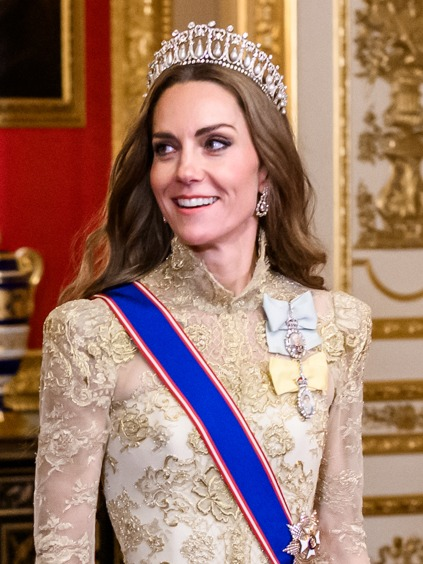
- Incumbent; Catherine since 8 September 2022
- Style: Her Royal Highness
- Member of: British royal family
- First holder: Joan of Kent

The Duchess of Cornwall is a title held by the wife of the heir apparent to the British throne. The Duchess of Cornwall is usually also the Princess of Wales, and she uses that title. The current title-holder is Catherine (née Middleton), whose husband, Prince William (later Prince of Wales), became the Duke of Cornwall on 8 September 2022, upon the death of his grandmother Queen Elizabeth II. Previously, Catherine's stepmother-in-law, Queen Camilla, was known by this title.

== Duchesses of Cornwall ==
Person	Name	Coat of Arms	Birth	Marriage	Became Duchess of Cornwall	Spouse	Change in style	Death
	Joan of Kent		19 September 1328	10 October 1361		Edward of Woodstock	7 June 1376; Husband's death; became Dowager Duchess of Cornwall	7 August 1385
	Anne Neville		11 June 1456	13 December 1470		Edward of Westminster	4 May 1471; Husband's death; became Dowager Duchess of Cornwall; later became queen consort as the wife of Richard III	16 March 1485
	Catherine of Aragon		16 December 1485	14 November 1501		Arthur Tudor	2 April 1502; Husband's death; became Dowager Duchess of Cornwall; later became queen consort as the wife of Henry VIII	7 January 1536
	Wilhelmina Charlotte Caroline of Brandenburg-Ansbach		1 March 1683	22 August 1705	1 August 1714	George Augustus	11 June 1727; Husband acceded to throne as George II; became queen consort	20 November 1737
	Augusta of Saxe-Gotha-Altenburg		30 November 1719	17 April 1736		Frederick Louis	31 March 1751; Husband's death; became Dowager Duchess of Cornwall	8 February 1772
	Caroline Amelia Elizabeth of Brunswick-Wolfenbüttel		17 May 1768	8 April 1795		George Augustus Frederick	29 January 1820; Husband acceded to throne as George IV; became queen consort	7 August 1821
	Alexandra Caroline Marie Charlotte Louise Julia of Denmark		1 December 1844	10 March 1863		Albert Edward	22 January 1901; Husband acceded to throne as Edward VII; became queen consort	20 November 1925
	Victoria Mary Augusta Louise Olga Pauline Claudine Agnes of Teck		26 May 1867	6 July 1893	22 January 1901	George Frederick Ernest Albert	6 May 1910; Husband acceded to throne as George V; became queen consort	24 March 1953
	Diana Frances Spencer		1 July 1961	29 July 1981		Charles Philip Arthur George	28 August 1996; Divorced; assumed the style of Diana, Princess of Wales	31 August 1997
	Camilla Rosemary Shand		17 July 1947	9 April 2005		Charles Philip Arthur George	8 September 2022; Husband acceded to throne as Charles III; became queen consort	living
	Catherine Elizabeth Middleton		9 January 1982	29 April 2011	8 September 2022	William Arthur Philip Louis	Incumbent	living

Until her husband's accession to the throne, Camilla, the second wife of the then-Charles, Prince of Wales, used the title "Duchess of Cornwall" rather than "Princess of Wales", as the latter was still popularly associated with Charles's first wife, Diana, who died in 1997.

== Literary references ==
- Arthurian legend depicts Cornwall with its own ducal family. Notably, King Arthur's mother, Igraine, would have been Duchess of Cornwall from her first marriage to Duke Gorlois; in some stories, the title is then passed on to their daughter, Morgan le Fay.
- Shakespeare's King Lear includes the character of Regan, Duchess of Cornwall, the second daughter of Lear (the legendary Leir of Britain).

== See also ==
- Duke of Cornwall
- Duchy of Cornwall
