= Ranulf de Briquessart =

Norman magnate

Ranulf de Briquessart (or Ranulf the Viscount) (born c. 1050, died c. 1089 or soon after) was an 11th-century Norman magnate and viscount.

== Biography ==
Ranulf's family were connected to the House of Normandy by marriage, and, besides Odo, bishop of Bayeux, Ranulf was the most powerful magnate in the Bessin region. He married Margaret, daughter of Richard le Goz, Viscount of Avranches, whose son and successor Hugh d'Avranches became Earl of Chester in England c. 1070.

Ranulf is probably the "Ranulf the viscount" who witnessed a charter of William, Duke of Normandy, at Caen on 17 June 1066.

Ranulf helped preside over a judgment in the curia of King William (as duke) in 1076 in which a disputed mill was awarded to the Abbey of Mont Saint-Michel. On 14 July 1080 he witnessed a charter to the Abbey of Lessay (in the diocese of Coutances), another in the same year addressed to Remigius de Fécamp bishop of Lincoln in favour of the Abbey of Préaux. and one more in the same period, 1079-1082, to the Abbey of St Stephen of Caen. His name is attached to a memorandum in 1085, and on 24 April 1089 he witnessed a confirmation of Robert Curthose, Duke of Normandy and Count of Maine to St Mary of Bayeaux, where he appears below his son in the witness list.

He certainly died sometime after this. His son Ranulf le Meschin became ruler of Cumberland and later Earl of Chester. The Durham Liber Vitae, c. 1098-1120, shows that his eldest son was one Richard, who died in youth, and that he had another son named William. He also had a daughter called Agnes, who later married Robert (III) de Grandmesnil (died 1126 (fr) or 1136).

== Sources ==
- Davis, H. W. C.; Whitwell, R. J., eds. (1913), Regesta Regum Anglo-Normannorum 1066–1154: Volume I, Regesta Willelmi Conquestoris et Willielmi Rufi, 1066–1100, Oxford: Clarendon Press
- King, Edmund (2004), "Ranulf (I), third earl of Chester (d. 1129)", Oxford Dictionary of National Biography
- Hollister, C. Warren (2001), Henry I [edited and completed by Amanda Clark Frost], Yale English Monarchs, New Haven: Yale University Press, ISBN 0-300-08858-2
- Rollason, David; Rollason, Lynda, eds. (2007), Durham Liber vitae : London, British Library, MS Cotton Domitian A.VII : edition and digital facsimile with introduction, codicological, prosopographical and linguistic commentary, and indexes including the Biographical Register of Durham Cathedral Priory (1083–1539) by A. J. Piper, vol. I, London: British Library, ISBN 0-7123-4995-2
