= List of earls in the reign of William the Conqueror =

The following individuals were Earls during the reign of William the Conqueror who reigned from 1066 to 1087.

The period of tenure as Earl is given after the name of each individual, including any period of minority.

Earl of Chester (First creation)

Gerbod the Fleming, 1st Earl of Chester (1067–1071)

Earl of Chester (Second creation)

Hugh d'Avranches, Earl of Chester (1071–1101)

Earl of Cornwall (First creation)

Brian of Brittany (1068–1072)

Earl of Cornwall (Second creation)

Robert, Count of Mortain (1069–1088)

Earl of East Anglia

Ralph the Staller (1067–1068)

Ralph de Gael (1068–1075)

Earl of Hereford

William FitzOsbern, 1st Earl of Hereford (1067–1071)

Roger de Breteuil, 2nd Earl of Hereford (1071–1074)

Earl of Huntingdon Earl of Northampton

Waltheof, Earl of Northumbria (1065–1076)

Earl of Kent

Odo of Bayeux (1067–1082)

Earl of Mercia

Edwin, Earl of Mercia (1062–1071)

Earl of Northumbria

Morcar, Earl of Northumbria (1065–1071)

Copsi (1067)

Osulf II of Bamburgh (1067)

Gospatric, Earl of Northumbria (1067–1068)

Robert de Comines (1068–1069)

Gospatric, Earl of Northumbria (1070–1072)

Waltheof, Earl of Northumbria (1072–1076)

Walcher (1076–1080)

Aubrey de Coucy (1080–1086)

Robert de Mowbray (1086–1095)

Earl of Richmond

Alan Rufus (1066–1093)

Earl of Shrewsbury

Roger de Montgomery, 1st Earl of Shrewsbury (1068–1094)

== Sources ==
- Geoffrey Ellis, Earldoms in Fee: A Study in Peerage Law and History (London, 1963).
- Judith A. Green, Forging the Kingdom: Power in English Society, 973-1189 (Cambridge, 2017).
- William E. Kapelle, The Norman Conquest of the North: The Region and Its Transformation, 1000-1135 (London, 1979).
- C. P. Lewis, ‘The Early Earls of Norman England’ (1990) Anglo-Norman Studies Vol. XIII, 207 - 223.
- Christopher J. Morris, Marriage and Murder in Eleventh-Century Northumbria: A Study of 'De Obsessione Dunelmi' (York, 1992).
- Richard Oram, Domination and Lordship, Scotland 1070-1230 (Edinburgh, 2011).
- Douglas Pocock, The Story of Durham (Stroud, 2013).
- David Rollason, Northumbria, 500-1100 (Cambridge, 2003).
- Trevor Rowley, The Man Behind the Bayeux Tapestry: Odo, William the Conqueror’s Half-Brother (Stroud, 2013).
- R. Sharpe, ‘The earl and his shire in Anglo-Norman England’, in D. Crouch and H. F. Doherty (eds), The Earl in Medieval Britain (forthcoming).
- Matthew Strickland, ‘Military Technology and Political Resistance: Castles, Fleets and the Changing Face of Comital Rebellion in England and Normandy, c. 1026–1087’ in John Hudson and Sally Crumplin (eds), The Making of Europe: Essays in Honour of Robert Bartlett (2016).
