= Countess of Chester =

Countess of Chester, nowadays a secondary style of the princess of Wales derived from the prince of Wales’s secondary title of earl of Chester, may refer to:

- Countess of Chester Hospital, a hospital in Chester, England
- Countess of Chester Country Park, a park near the hospital
- Catherine, Princess of Wales, the present Countess of Chester

== See also ==
- Earl of Chester
- Princess of Wales § Spouse of the British (formerly English) heir apparent for a list of countesses of Chester
