= Wetheral Priory Gatehouse =

Grade I listed building in Wetheral, UK

- Wetheral, Cumbria, England
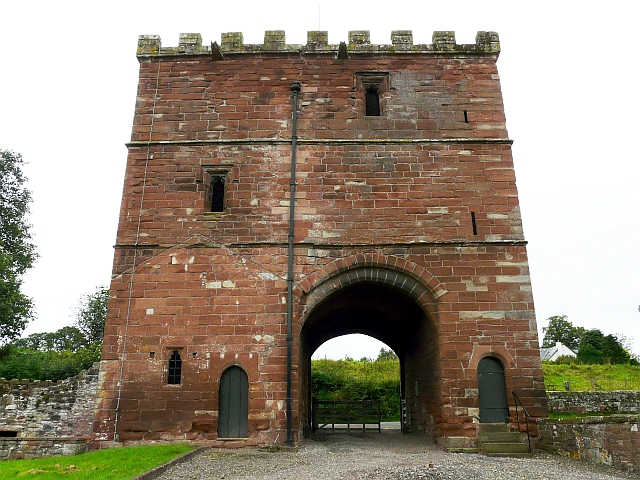
- The exterior of the gatehouse

Site information
- Owner: English Heritage
- Open to the public: Yes

Location
- Location in Cumbria
- Coordinates: 54.87971°N 2.83069°W

Site history
- Built: 15th century
- Materials: Red sandstone

Wetheral Priory Gatehouse is a 15th-century stone fortification in Wetheral, Cumbria. The priory was founded at the start of the 12th century and the gatehouse controlled the entrance to its outer courtyard. When the priory was dissolved in 1538 the gatehouse and a nearby stretch of wall were the only parts to survive. The gatehouse passed into the control of Carlisle Cathedral and became the local vicarage during the 16th and 17th centuries, before being used to store hay. Now part of a modern farm that occupies the former priory site, it is controlled by English Heritage and open to visitors. The crenellated gatehouse has three storeys, with the main entrance and porters' lodge on the ground floor and two domestic chambers on the upper floors. English Heritage considers the building to be "the finest medieval gatehouse in Cumbria".

== History ==
Wetheral Priory Gatehouse was probably built in the 15th century and formed the entrance to the priory's outer courtyard. Wetheral Priory was a small Benedictine institution, founded by Ranulf le Meschin following the Norman invasion of Cumbria at the beginning of the 12th century. The motherhouse of the priory was St Mary's Abbey in York. The priory was known for a special right of sanctuary for criminals that had been granted to it by Henry I, allowing the priory to shelter felons who could reach the church and ring the bell there.

The gatehouse originally formed part of a range of buildings running along the side of the outer courtyard, and would have controlled access to the institution, as well as symbolising its power and status. The Anglo-Scottish border was also still dangerous in the 15th century, and many monasteries in the area, like Wetheral, had protective fortifications.

By the 16th century, the priory was in decline, but its closure came as a result of the dissolution of the monasteries in England and Wales under Henry VIII. To help speed the process of closing the institution, Ralf Hartley was appointed as the prior of Wetheral by Henry's minister, Thomas Cromwell; royal commissioners visited in 1536, and the priory was finally surrendered to the Crown in 1538. The priory's belongings were sold off or taken by Henry, depending on their value, but the lands were given to Carlisle Cathedral. Although the rest of the priory soon fell into disrepair, the gatehouse became the local vicarage; it was still intact and in use by the minister in 1687.

The gatehouse was later used as a hayloft. In 1978 it passed into the guardianship of the state, and is now in the care of English Heritage and open to the public. Still well preserved, it is protected under UK law as a Grade I listed building.

== Architecture ==
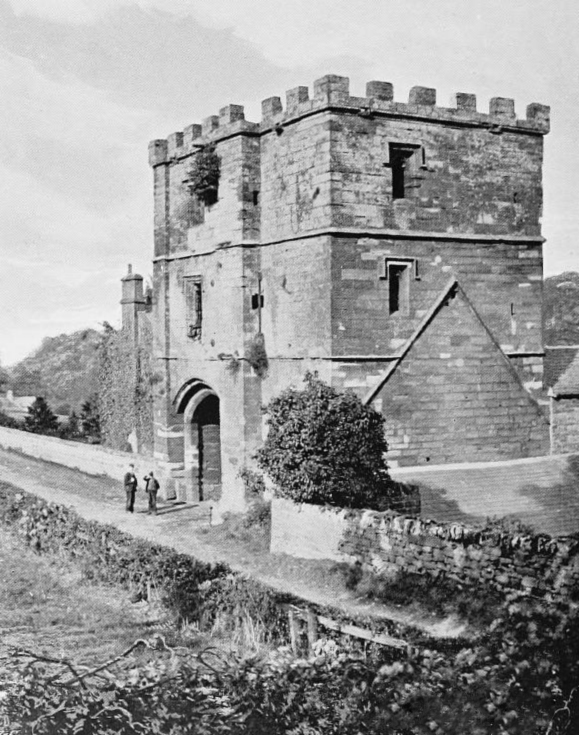
The gatehouse at the end of the 19th century

English Heritage considers the building to be "the finest medieval gatehouse in Cumbria". It closely resembles the larger fortifications at Thornton Abbey and Tynemouth Priory, forming a three-storey building built of coursed red sandstone, and now stands on the edge of the modern Wetheral Priory Farm, which occupies the site of the original priory. The gatehouse is 12.5 by 8.9 metres (41 by 29 ft) across, with the floors linked by a spiral staircase in the north-east corner, and an adjacent barrel vaulted cellar. The marks of the range of buildings that once ran alongside the gatehouse can be seen on the external walls, and the gatehouse is topped by battlements.

The ground floor includes a barrel vaulted entrance passageway and a porters' lodge, the latter 5.3 by 3 metres (17.4 by 9.8 ft) in size. The first and second floors both formed single rooms, approximately 7.6 by 5.2 metres (25 by 17 ft) across internally, and would have been used as domestic chambers for the officials of the priory. They had fireplaces, garderobes and small bed chambers in the walls. The roof is predominantly built of timbers dating from between 1512 and 1536; the current structure was probably built around 1540, possibly when the building was converted for use as a vicarage.

North-east of the gatehouse is a 23-metre (75 ft) medieval, red sandstone wall, 2.4 metres (7 ft 10 in) high, probably originally the east wall of the priory's chapter house. This medieval wall had four windows running along it, with a staircase at one end.

== See also ==
- Grade I listed buildings in Cumbria
- Listed buildings in Wetheral
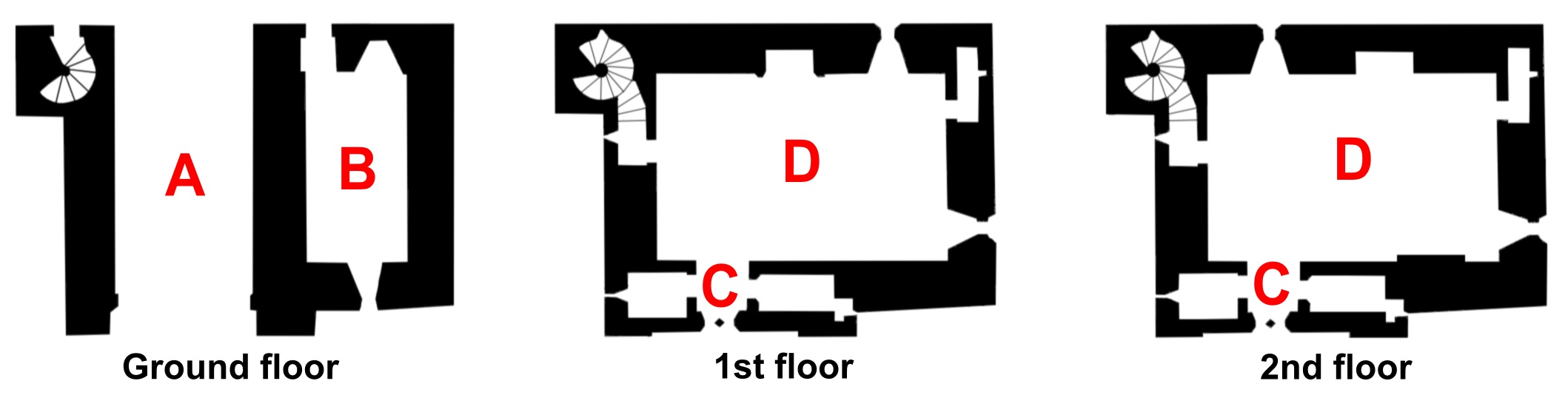
Plan of the gatehouse; A - entrance passageway; B - porter's lodge; C - domestic chamber; D - bed chamber

== Bibliography ==
- Arnold, A.; Howard, R. E.; Litton, C. D. (2004). Tree-Ring Analysis of Timbers from Wetheral Priory Gatehouse, Wetheral, Cumbria. London, UK: English Heritage. ISSN 1473-9224.
- Emery, Anthony (1996). Greater Medieval Houses of England and Wales, 1300–1500: Volume 1, Northern England. Cambridge, UK: Cambridge University Press. ISBN 9780521497237.
- Harrison, Peter (2004). Castles of God: Fortified Religious Buildings of the World. Woodbridge, UK: Boydell Press. ISBN 9781843830665.
- Prescott, John Eustace (1897). The Register of the Priory of Wetheral. London, UK: Elliot Stock. OCLC 750432852.
