= Gerbod the Fleming, 1st Earl of Chester =

1st Earl of Chester

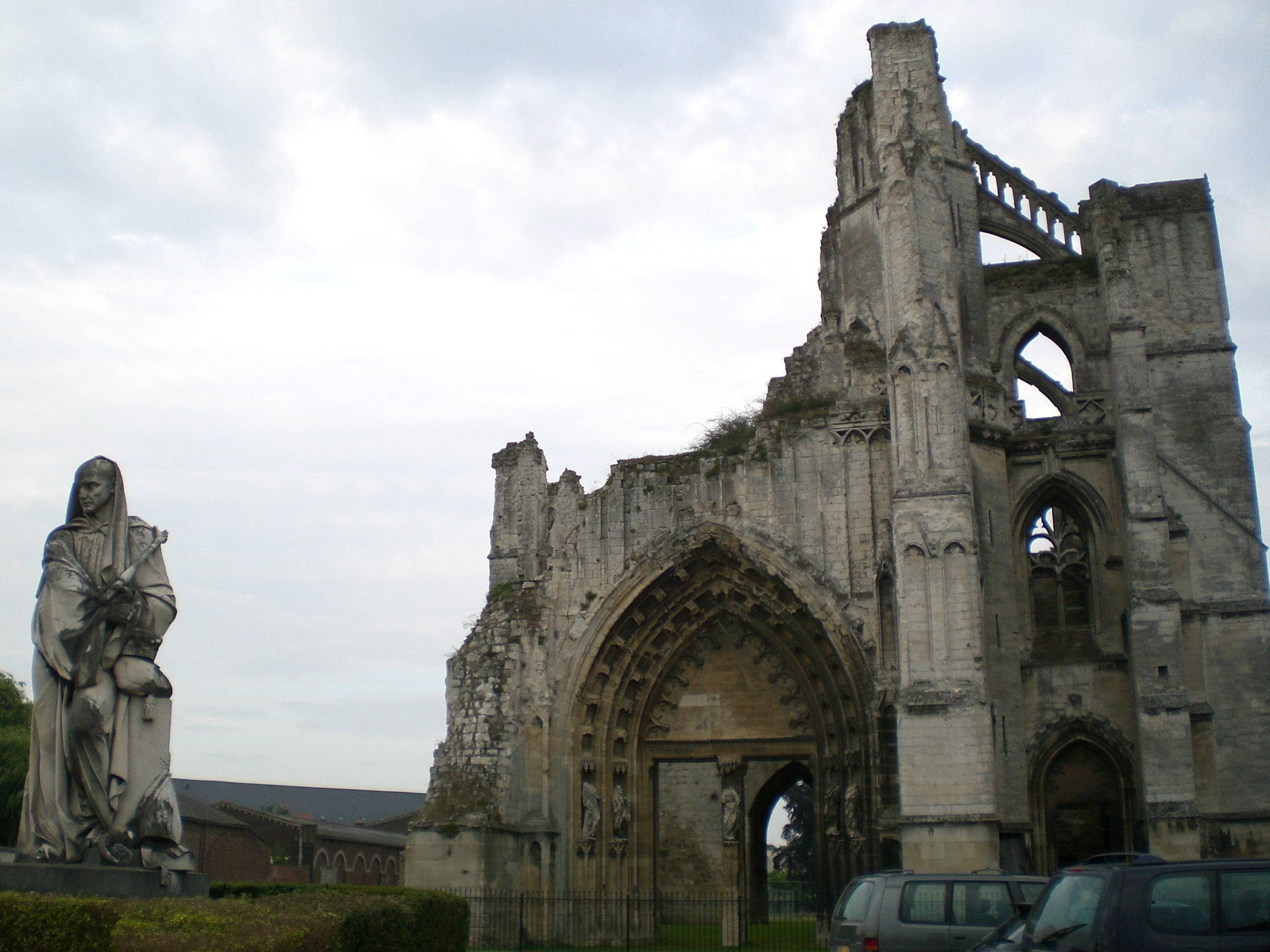
Ruins of Saint-Bertin Abbey at Saint-Omer

Gerbod the Fleming, of Oosterzele, 1st Earl of Chester, was a hereditary advocate of the Abbey of Saint Bertin at Saint-Omer, County of Flanders (now Department Pas-de-Calais, France) and Earl of Chester in 1070.

== Life ==
Gerbod of Oosterzele was the son of another Gerbod, hereditary advocate of the abbey of Saint-Bertin. Among the fourteen tenants-in-chief from Flanders, Gerbod the Fleming was one of the most prominent. His family held the lordships of Oosterzele and Scheldewindeke, the overlordship of Arques and territorial rights in Saint-Omer.

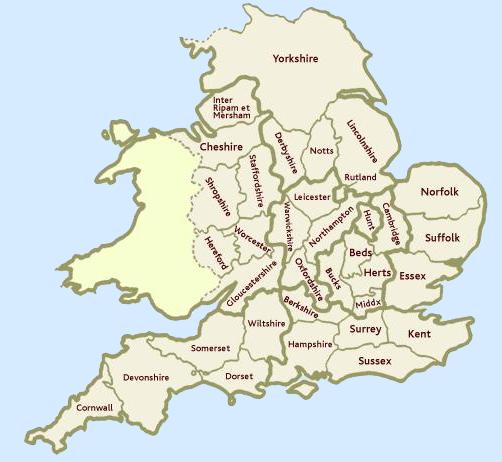
The Counties of England following the Norman conquest. Chester can be seen in the west, at the northern end of the Welsh border.

Hundreds of the county of Chester

In 1066, he was in the service of William the Conqueror, most probably at the battle of Hastings, and, between 1067 and 1070, was created Earl of Chester, holding a large portion of that county along with the city of Chester forming the county palatine of Chester. His brother, Frederic, was a tenant-in-chief in East Anglia and his sister Gundred married William I de Warenne, later 1st Earl of Surrey, whose caput was Castle Acre in Norfolk.

Gerbod was mentioned as being a part of the reduction of Cheshire in 1070 by the Conqueror, at which time Gerbod was given the Earldom of Chester. Orderic Vitalis reports that Gerbod was harassed by both English and Welsh in his new position and he may have been glad to return to Flanders later that same year. This may have been due to concerns having to do with the death of the Count of Flanders, Baldwin VI, and the subsequent civil war.

According to Orderic Vitalis, he fought in the battle of Cassel in February 1071 in Flanders where he fell into the hands of his enemies and was held captive. William I, seeing the earldom vacant, used his imprisonment as a reason for giving the earldom of Chester to Hugh 'Lupus' d'Avranches. The Hyde Chronicle reported Gerbod died a prisoner.

However, an English and a Norman source both state that Gerbod was not imprisoned following Cassel, Instead he fled to Rome to seek forgiveness for the sin of killing Arnulf III, Count of Flanders, his liege lord during the battle. Pope Gregory VII sent him to Hugh, Abbot of Cluny. Gerbod remained at Cluny becoming a distinguished monk within its ecclesiastical community.

Prior to becoming a monk, Gerbod married Ada (last name unknown), (Note: Chris Philips, The family of Gerbod and Gundred: documents,(see: Charter of Gerbod and his wife Ada to St Bertin's Abbey)) with whom he had at least three children.

== Issue ==
- Arnulf III of Oosterzele-Scheldewindeke
- Gerbod III of Oosterzele-Scheldewindeke
- Albert of Scheldewindeke

It is also possible he was the Father of Maud de Maulde, Wife of Nicholas de Stafford, as she is described as the Daughter of the Earl of Chester. There has been no evidence found to date.

== See also ==
- List of earls in the reign of William the Conqueror
