= Ranulf le Meschin, 3rd Earl of Chester =

Norman magnate (1070–1129)

Ranulf le Meschin
- Earl of Chester (previously) Lord of Cumberland
- Predecessor: Richard d'Avranches
- Successor: Ranulf de Gernon
- Other names: Ranulf de Briquessart
- Died: January 1129
- Buried: Chester Abbey
- Spouse: Lucy of Bolingbroke (Countess-consort of Chester)
- Issue: Ranulf de Gernon; Alicia
- Father: Ranulf de Bessin
- Mother: Margaret le Goz

Ranulf le Meschin, 3rd Earl of Chester (1070–1129) was a Norman magnate based in northern and central England. Originating in Bessin in Normandy, Ranulf made his career in England thanks to his kinship with Hugh d'Avranches - the Earl of Chester, the patronage of kings William II Rufus and Henry I Beauclerc, and his marriage to Lucy, heiress of the Bolingbroke-Spalding estates in Lincolnshire.

Ranulf fought in Normandy on behalf of Henry I, and served the English king as a kind of semi-independent governor in the far north-west, in Cumberland and Westmorland, founding Wetheral Priory. After the death of his cousin Richard d'Avranches in the White Ship Disaster of November 1120, Ranulf became Earl of the County of Chester on the Anglo-Welsh marches and Viscount of Avranches in Normandy. He held this position for the remainder of his life, and passed the title on to his son, Ranulf de Gernon. Ranulf also had a daughter Alice, who married Richard Fitz Gilbert de Clare.

== Biography ==
=== Family and origins ===
Ranulf le Meschin's father and mother represented two different families of viscounts in Normandy, and both of them were strongly tied to Henry, son of William the Conqueror. His father was Ranulf de Bessin, and likely for this reason the former Ranulf was styled le Meschin, "the younger". Ranulf's father was viscount of the Bessin, the area around Bayeux. Besides Odo, bishop of Bayeux, Ranulf the elder was the most powerful magnate in the Bessin region of Normandy. Ranulf le Meschin's great-grandmother may even have been from the ducal family of Normandy, as le Meschin's paternal great-grandfather viscount Anschitil is known to have married a daughter of Duke Richard III.

Ranulf le Meschin's mother, Margaret, was the daughter of Richard le Goz, Viscount of Avranches. Richard's father Thurstan le Goz had become viscount of the Hiémois between 1017 and 1025, while Richard himself became viscount of the Avranchin in either 1055 or 1056. Her brother (Richard Goz's son) was Hugh d'Avranches "Lupus" ("the Wolf"), Viscount of the Avranchin and Earl of Chester (from c. 1070). Ranulf was thus, in addition to being heir to the Bessin, the nephew of one of Norman England's most powerful and prestigious families.

An entry in the Durham Liber Vitae, c. 1098 x 1120, indicates that Ranulf le Meschin had an older brother named Richard (who died in youth), and a younger brother named William. He had a sister called Agnes, who later married Robert de Grandmesnil (died 1136).

=== Early career ===
Historian C. Warren Hollister thought that Ranulf's father Ranulf de Briquessart was one of the early close companions of Prince Henry, the future Henry I. Hollister called Ranulf the Elder "a friend from Henry's youthful days in western Normandy", and argued that the homeland of the two Ranulfs had been under Henry's overlordship since 1088, despite both ducal and royal authority lying with Henry's two brothers. Hollister further suggested that Ranulf le Meschin may have had a role in persuading Robert Curthose to free Henry from captivity in 1089.

The date of Ranulf senior's death, and succession of Ranulf junior, is unclear, but the former's last and the latter's earliest appearance in extant historical records coincides, dating to 24 April 1089 in charter of Robert Curthose, Duke of Normandy, to Bayeux Cathedral. Ranulf le Meschin appears as "Ranulf son of Ranulf the viscount".

In the foundation charter of Chester Abbey granted by his uncle Hugh Lupus, Earl of Chester, and purportedly issued in 1093, Ranulf le Meschin is listed as a witness. His attestation to this grant is written Signum Ranulfi nepotis comitis, "signature of Ranulf nephew of the earl". However, the editor of the Chester comital charters, Geoffrey Barraclough, thought this charter was forged in the period of Earl Ranulf II. Between 1098 and 1101 (probably in 1098) Ranulf became a major English landowner in his own right when he became the third husband of Lucy, heiress of the honour of Bolingbroke in Lincolnshire. This acquisition also brought him the lordship of Appleby in Westmorland, previously held by Lucy's second husband Ivo Taillebois.

Marriage to a great heiress came only with royal patronage, which in turn meant that Ranulf had to be respected and trusted by the king. Ranulf was probably, like his father, among the earliest and most loyal of Henry's followers, and was noted as such by Orderic Vitalis. Ranulf was however not recorded often at the court of Henry I, and did not form part of the king's closest group of administrative advisers. He witnessed charters only occasionally, though this became more frequent after he became earl. In 1106 he is found serving as one of several justiciars at York hearing a case about the lordship of Ripon. In 1116 he is recorded in a similar context.

Ranulf was, however, one of the king's military companions. When, soon after Whitsun 1101 Henry heard news of a planned invasion of England by his brother Robert Curthose, he sought promises from his subjects to defend the kingdom. A letter to the men of Lincolnshire names Ranulf as one of four figures entrusted with collecting these oaths. Ranulf was one of the magnates who accompanied King Henry on his invasion of Duke Robert's Norman territory in 1106. Ranulf served under Henry as an officer of the royal household when the latter was on campaign; Ranulf was in fact one of his three commanders at the Battle of Tinchebrai. The first line of Henry's force was led by Ranulf, the second (with the king) by Robert of Meulan, and third by William de Warrene, with another thousand knights from Brittany and Maine led by Helias, Count of Maine. Ranulf's line consisted of the men of Bayeux, Avranches and Coutances.

=== Lord of Cumberland ===
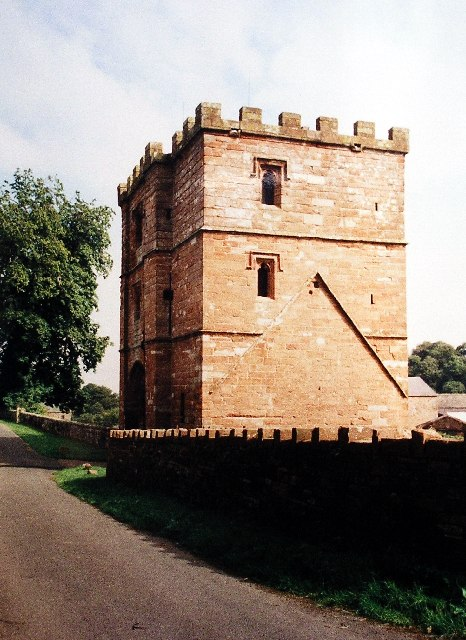
The gatehouse of Wetheral Priory, founded by Ranulf c. 1106.

A charter issued in 1124 by David I, King of the Scots, to Robert I de Brus cited Ranulf's lordship of Carlisle and Cumberland as a model for Robert's new lordship in Annandale. This is significant because Robert is known from other sources to have acted with semi-regal authority in this region. A source from 1212 attests that the jurors of Cumberland remembered Ranulf as quondam dominus Cumberland ("sometime Lord of Cumberland"). Ranulf possessed the power and in some respects the dignity of a semi-independent earl in the region, though he lacked the formal status of being called such. A contemporary illustration of this authority comes from the records of Wetheral Priory, where Ranulf is found addressing his own sheriff, "Richer" (probably Richard de Boivill, baron of Kirklinton). No royal activity occurred in Cumberland or Westmorland during Ranulf's time in charge there, testimony to the fullness of his powers in the region.

Ivo Taillebois, when he married Ranulf's future wife Lucy, had acquired her Lincolnshire lands but sometime after 1086 he acquired estates in Kendal and elsewhere in Westmorland. Adjacent lands in Westmorland and Lancashire that had previously been controlled by Earl Tostig Godwinson were probably carved up between Roger the Poitevin and Ivo in the 1080s, a territorial division at least partially responsible for the later boundary between the two counties. Norman lordship in the heartland of Cumberland can be dated from chronicle sources to around 1092, the year King William Rufus seized the region from its previous ruler, Dolfin. There is inconclusive evidence that settlers from Ivo's Lincolnshire lands had come into Cumberland as a result.

Between 1094 and 1098 Lucy was married to Roger fitz Gerold de Roumare, and it is probable that this marriage was the king's way of transferring authority in the region to Roger fitz Gerold. Only from 1106 however, well into the reign of Henry I, do we have certain evidence that this authority had come to Ranulf. The "traditional view", held by the historian William Kapelle, was that Ranulf's authority in the region did not come about until 1106 or after, as a reward for participation in the Battle of Tinchebrai. Another historian, Richard Sharpe, has recently attacked this view and argued that it probably came in or soon after 1098. Sharpe stressed that Lucy was the mechanism by which this authority changed hands, and pointed out that Ranulf had been married to Lucy years before Tinchebrai and can be found months before Tinchebrai taking evidence from county jurors at York (which may have been responsible for Cumbria at this point).

Ranulf likewise distributed land to the church, founding a Benedictine monastic house at Wetheral. This he established as a daughter-house of St Mary's Abbey, York, a house that in turn had been generously endowed by Ivo Taillebois. This had occurred by 1112, the year of the death of Abbot Stephen of St Mary's, named in the foundation deed. In later times at least, the priory of Wetheral was dedicated to St Mary and the Holy Trinity, as well as another saint named Constantine. Ranulf gave Wetheral, among other things, his two churches at Appleby, St Lawrences (Burgate) and St Michaels (Bongate).

As an incoming regional magnate, Ranulf would be expected to distribute land to his own followers, and indeed the record of the jurors of Cumberland dating to 1212 claimed that Ranulf created two baronies in the region. Ranulf's brother-in-law Robert de Trevers received the barony of Burgh-by-Sands, while the barony of Liddel went to Turgis Brandos. He appears to have attempted to give the large compact barony of Gilsland to his brother William, but failed to dislodge the native lord, the eponymous "Gille" son of Boite; later the lordship of Allerdale (including Copeland), even larger than Gilsland stretching along the coast from the River Ellen to the River Esk, was given to William. Kirklinton may have been given to Richard de Boivill, Ranulf's sheriff.

=== Earl of Chester ===
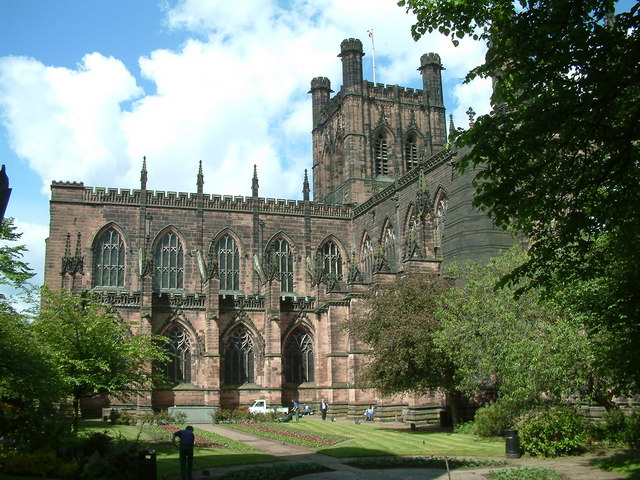
Chester Cathedral today, originally Chester Abbey, where Ranulf's body was buried.

1120 was a fateful year for both Henry I and Ranulf. Richard, Earl of Chester, like Henry's son and heir William Adeling, died in the White Ship Disaster near Barfleur on 25 November. Only four days before the disaster, Ranulf and his cousin Richard had witnessed a charter together at Cerisy.

Henry probably could not wait long to replace Richard, as the Welsh were resurgent under the charismatic leadership of Gruffudd ap Cynan. According to the Historia Regum, Richard's death prompted the Welsh to raid Cheshire, looting, killing, and burning two castles. Perhaps because of his recognised military ability and social strength, because he was loyal and because he was the closest male relation to Earl Richard, Henry recognized Ranulf as Richard's successor to the county of Chester.

In 1123, Henry sent Ranulf to Normandy with his bastard son, Robert, Earl of Gloucester and a large number of knights to strengthen the garrisons there. Ranulf commanded the king's garrison at Évreux and governed the county of Évreux during the 1123-1124 war with William Clito, Robert Curthose's son and heir. In March 1124 Ranulf assisted in the capture of Waleran, Count of Meulan. Scouts informed Ranulf that Waleran's forces were planning an expedition to Vatteville, and Ranulf planned to intercept them, a plan carried out by Henry de Pommeroy, Odo Borleng and William de Pont-Authou, with 300 knights. A battle followed, perhaps at Rougemontier (or Bourgthéroulde), in which Waleran was captured.

Although Ranulf bore the title "earl of Chester", the honour (i.e., group of estates) which formed the holdings of the earl of Chester were scattered throughout England, and during the rule of his predecessors included the cantref of Tegeingl in Perfeddwlad in north-eastern Wales. Around 1100, only a quarter of the value of the honour actually lay in Cheshire, which was one of England's poorest and least developed counties. The estates elsewhere were probably given to the earls in compensation for Cheshire's poverty, in order to strengthen its vulnerable position on the Anglo-Welsh border. The possibility of conquest and booty in Wales should have supplemented the lordship's wealth and attractiveness, but for much of Henry's reign the English king tried to keep the neighbouring Welsh princes under his peace.

Ranulf's accession may have involved him giving up many of his other lands, including much of his wife's Lincolnshire lands as well as his lands in Cumbria, though direct evidence for this beyond convenient timing is lacking. That Cumberland was given up at this point is likely, as King Henry visited Carlisle in December 1122, where, according to the Historia Regum, he ordered the strengthening of the castle.

Hollister believed that Ranulf offered the Bolingbroke lands to Henry in exchange for Henry's bestowal of the earldom. The historian A. T. Thacker believed that Henry I forced Ranulf to give up most of the Bolingbroke lands through fear that Ranulf would become too powerful, dominating both Cheshire and the richer county of Lincoln. Sharpe, however, suggested that Ranulf may have had to sell a great deal of land in order to pay the king for the county of Chester, though it could not have covered the whole fee, as Ranulf's son Ranulf de Gernon, when he succeeded his father to Chester in 1129, owed the king £1000 "from his father's debt for the land of Earl Hugh". Hollister thought this debt was merely the normal feudal relief expected to be paid on a large honour, and suggested that Ranulf's partial non-payment, or Henry's forgiveness for non-payment, was a form of royal patronage.

Ranulf died in January 1129, and was buried in Chester Abbey. He was survived by his wife and countess, Lucy, and succeeded by his son Ranulf de Gernon. A daughter, Alicia, married Richard de Clare, a lord in the Anglo-Welsh marches. One of his offspring, his fifth son, participated in the Siege of Lisbon, and for this aid was granted the Lordship of Azambuja by King Afonso I of Portugal.

That his career had some claim on the popular imagination may be inferred from lines in William Langland's Piers Plowman (c. 1362–c. 1386) in which Sloth, the lazy priest, confesses: "I kan [know] not parfitly [perfectly] my Paternoster as the preest it singeth,/ But I kan rymes of Robyn Hood and Randolf Erl of Chestre."

== Sources ==
- Barraclough, Geoffrey, ed. (1988), The Charters of the Anglo-Norman Earls of Chester, c.1071–1237, The Record Society of Lancashire and Chester founded to transcribe and publish original documents relating to the two counties; volume 126, Gloucester: Record Society of Lancashire and Cheshire, ISBN 0-902593-17-X
- Crouch, David (1991), "The Administration of the Norman Earldom", in Thacker, A. T. (ed.), The Earldom of Chester and Its Charters: A Tribute to Geoffrey Barraclough, Special issue of the Journal of the Chester Archaeological Society; volume 71, vol. 71, Chester: Chester Archaeological Society, pp. 69–95, doi:10.5284/1070312, ISBN 0-9507074-3-0
- Davies, R. R. (1987), Conquest, coexistence and change: Wales 1063-1415, Oxford: Oxford University Press, ISBN 0-19-821732-3
- Davis, H. W. C.; Whitwell, R. J., eds. (1913), Regesta Regum Anglo-Normannorum 1066–1154: Volume I, Regesta Willelmi Conquestoris et Willielmi Rufi, 1066–1100, Oxford: Clarendon Press
- Douglas, David (1999), William the Conqueror: The Norman Impact upon England, Yale English Monarchs (New ed.), New Haven: Yale University Press, ISBN 0-300-07884-6
- Green, Judith (2002), The Aristocracy of Norman England, Cambridge: Cambridge University Press, ISBN 0-521-52465-2
- Green, Judith A. (2006), Henry I: King of England and Duke of Normandy, Cambridge: Cambridge University Press, ISBN 978-0-521-59131-7
- Hinde, John Hodgson, ed. (1868), Symeonis Dunelmensis Opera et Collectanea, Publications of the Surtees Society; volume 51, Durham: Surtees Society/ Andrews and Co
- Hollister, C. Warren (2001), Henry I [edited and completed by Amanda Clark Frost], Yale English Monarchs, New Haven: Yale University Press, ISBN 0-300-08858-2
- Kapelle, William E. (1979), The Norman Conquest of the North: The Region and Its Transformation, 1000–1135, London: Croom Helm Ltd, ISBN 0-7099-0040-6
- King, Edmund (2004). "Ranulf (I), third earl of Chester (d. 1129)". Oxford Dictionary of National Biography (Fee required). Oxford Dictionary of National Biography (online ed.). Oxford University Press. doi:10.1093/ref:odnb/23127. (Subscription, Wikipedia Library access or UK public library membership required.)
- Lewis, C. P. (2004). "Avranches, Hugh d', first earl of Chester (d. 1101), magnate and founder of Chester Abbey". Oxford Dictionary of National Biography (Fee required). Oxford Dictionary of National Biography (online ed.). Oxford University Press. doi:10.1093/ref:odnb/14056. (Subscription, Wikipedia Library access or UK public library membership required.)
- Knowles, David; Brooke, C. N. L.; London, C. M, eds. (2001), The Heads of Religious Houses: England and Wales. 1, 940–1216 (2nd ed.), Cambridge: Cambridge University Press, ISBN 0-521-80452-3
- Lewis, C. P. (1991), "The formation of the honor of Chester, 1066–1100", in Thacker, A. T. (ed.), The Earldom of Chester and Its Charters: A Tribute to Geoffrey Barraclough, Special issue of the Journal of the Chester Archaeological Society; volume 71, vol. 71, Chester: Chester Archaeological Society, pp. 37–68, doi:10.5284/1070311, ISBN 0-9507074-3-0
- Newman, Charlotte A. (1988), The Anglo-Norman Nobility in the Reign of Henry I: The Second Generation, Philadelphia: University of Philadelphia Press, ISBN 0-8122-8138-1
- Phythian-Adams, Charles (1996), Land of the Cumbrians: A Study in British Provincial Origins, A. D. 400–1120, Aldershot: Scolar Press, ISBN 1-85928-327-6
- Rollason, David; Rollason, Lynda, eds. (2007), Durham Liber vitae: London, British Library, MS Cotton Domitian A.VII: edition and digital facsimile with introduction, codicological, prosopographical and linguistic commentary, and indexes including the Biographical Register of Durham Cathedral Priory (1083–1539) by A. J. Piper, vol. I, London: British Library, ISBN 978-0-7123-4995-6
- Sharpe, Richard (2006), Norman Rule in Cumbria, 1092–1136: A Lecture Delivered to Cumberland and Westmorland Antiquarian and Archaeological Society on 9 April 2005 at Carlisle, Cumberland and Westmorland Antiquarian and Archaeological Society Tract Series No. XXI, Kendal: Cumberland and Westmorland Antiquarian and Archaeological Society, ISBN 1-873124-43-0
- Stevenson, Joseph (1858), Simeon of Durham: A History of the Kings of England, Facsimile reprint of 1987, from Church Historians of England, vol. iii. 2 (1858), Lampeter: Llanerch, ISBN 0-947992-12-X
- Summerson, Henry (1993), Medieval Carlisle: The City and the Borders from the Late Eleventh to the Mid-Sixteenth Century (2 vols), The Cumberland and Westmorland Antiquarian and Archaeological Society, Extra Series XXV, Kendal: The Cumberland and Westmorland Antiquarian and Archaeological Society, ISBN 1-873124-18-X
- Strutt, Joseph; Hulbert, Charles, eds. (1838), Cheshire antiquities, Roman, baronial, and monastic: a re-publ. of orig. copper plates, engr. by J. Strutt, with descriptions &c., London: C. Hulbert
- Thacker, A. T. (1991), "Introduction: The Earls and Their Earldom", in Thacker, A. T. (ed.), The Earldom of Chester and Its Charters: A Tribute to Geoffrey Barraclough, Special issue of the Journal of the Chester Archaeological Society; volume 71, vol. 71, Chester: Chester Archaeological Society, pp. 7–22, doi:10.5284/1070309, ISBN 0-9507074-3-0
- Todd, John M. (March 2006), "The West March on the Anglo-Scottish Border in the Twelfth Century and the Origins of the Western Debatable Land", Northern History, 43 (1): 11–19, doi:10.1179/174587006X86783, ISSN 0078-172X, S2CID 159479394

Peerage of England
| Preceded by Richard d'Avranches | Earl of Chester; 1120–1129 | Succeeded by Ranulf de Gernon |
