= Richard d'Avranches, 2nd Earl of Chester =

English noble (1094–1120)

Richard d'Avranches
- Arms of Richard d'Avranches, 2nd Earl of Chester: Gules, A wolf's head Argent within an orle of crosses crosslet Or.
- Born: 1094
- Died: 25 November 1120 (aged 25–26)
- Title: Earl of Chester
- Term: 1101–1120
- Predecessor: Hugh d'Avranches, 1st Earl
- Successor: Ranulf le Meschin, 3rd Earl
- Spouse: Matilda de Blois

Richard d'Avranches, 2nd Earl of Chester (1094 – 25 November 1120) was an Anglo-Norman nobleman, the son of Hugh d'Avranches, 1st Earl of Chester, and his wife, Ermentrude of Clermont.

== Early life ==
Born in 1094, Richard was the son of Hugh d'Avranches, 1st Earl of Chester and 2nd Viscount of Avranches, and his wife, Ermentrude of Clermont. His father died in 1101 leaving Richard as his heir. Due to his age, a stewardship would have ruled until he was old enough. He probably became Earl of Chester in 1107. Richard married Matilda, daughter of Count Stephen-Henry of Blois and Adela of Normandy, daughter of King William the Conqueror.

== Military career ==
At the age of twenty, in 1114, Richard was on a military campaign and was styled the Earl of Chester. Together with King Alexander I of Scotland, he led an Anglo-Norman army into Gwynedd as part of a three-pronged campaign organised by King Henry I of England against Gwynedd, and Gruffudd ap Cynan. Gruffudd, rather than risk battle, satisfied the King with an oath of homage and a suitable fine. The campaign soon fizzled out, and Richard returned to Chester.

== White Ship ==
The line of the d'Avranches as Earls of Chester failed when Richard, his wife, and his illegitimate half-brother Ottuel, joined the young William Adelin, heir to the English king Henry I aboard the doomed White Ship, which sank in 1120. The captain, unwisely, chose to race out of the harbour. The ship struck a submerged rocky embankment, capsized and sank. Richard, aged twenty-six, his wife Matilda, and half-brother Ottuel all drowned.

The earldom then passed through his father Hugh's sister Maud to Richard's first cousin Ranulph I, in 1121, because Hugh had no other suitable male heirs.

== Sources ==
- Aurell, Martin (2017). The Lettered Knight: Knowledge and Aristocratic Behaviour in the Twelfth and Thirteenth Centuries. Translated by Khalifa, Jean-Charles; Price, Jeremy. Central European University Press.
- Christelow, Stephanie Mooers (1996). "The Division of Inheritance and the Provision of Non-Inheriting Offspring among the Anglo-Norman Elite". Medieval Prosopography. 17 (2 (Autumn)). Board of Trustees of Western Michigan University through its Medieval Institute Publications: 3–44.
- Hanley, Catherine (2019). Matilda: Empress, Queen, Warrior. Yale University Press.
- Johns, Susan M. (2003). Noblewomen, aristocracy and power in the twelfth-century Anglo-Norman realm. Manchester University Press.
- LoPrete, Kimberly A. (2007). Adela of Blois: Countess and Lord (c.1067-1137). Four Courts Press.
- Tyerman, Christopher (2001). "Hugh, Count of Avranches, and Earl of Chester (c.1047-1101)". Who's who in Early Medieval England, 1066-1272. Stackpole Books. pp. 39–40.39

Peerage of England
Preceded by Hugh d'Avranches	Earl of Chester; 1107–1120	Succeeded by Ranulf le Meschin
