= Earl of Chester =

Historical earldom now granted as an honour to the Prince of Wales

Earldom of Chester subsidiary of Principality of Wales since 1343
- Prince of Wales's feathers
- Creation date: 1067 (first creation); 1071 (second creation); 1254 (third creation); 1264 (fourth creation); 1301 (fifth creation); 1312 (sixth creation) see Prince of Wales for further creations
- Created by: William the Conqueror (first creation); William the Conqueror (second creation); Henry III (third creation); Henry III (fourth creation); Edward I (fifth creation); Edward II (sixth creation)
- Peerage: Peerage of the United Kingdom
- First holder: Gerbod the Fleming, 1st Earl of Chester
- Present holder: William, Prince of Wales
- Heir apparent: Non-Hereditary
- Extinction date: 1070 (first creation); 1237 (second creation); 1272 (third creation); 1265 (fourth creation); 1307 (fifth creation); 1327 (sixth creation)
- Former seat: Chester Castle
- Motto: Ich dien (I serve)

Hugh de Kevelioc used six wheatsheafs on his arms. His son Ranulf de Blondeville reduced their number to three, and this form has become an emblem of Cheshire generally, despite later earls bearing different arms. Blazon: Azure, three garbs (sheafs of wheat).

The Earldom of Chester (Welsh: Iarllaeth Caer) was one of the most powerful earldoms in medieval England, extending principally over the counties of Cheshire and Flintshire. Since 1301 the title has generally been granted to heirs apparent to the English throne, and after 1707 the British throne. From the late 14th century, it has been given only in conjunction with that of Prince of Wales.

== Honour of Chester and County Palatinate ==

The County of Cheshire was held by the powerful Earls (or "Counts" from the Norman-French) of Chester from the late eleventh century, and they held land all over England, comprising "the honour of Chester". By the late twelfth century (if not earlier) the earls had established a position of power as quasi-princely rulers of Cheshire that led to the later establishment of the County Palatine of Chester and Flint. Such was their power that Magna Carta set down by King John did not apply to Cheshire and the sixth earl was compelled to issue his own version.

== County palatine ==
The strategic location of the Earldom of Chester; the only county palatine on the Welsh Marches. Pura Wallia (independent Wales) Lands gained by Llywelyn the Great in 1234 Marchia Wallie (lands controlled by Norman Marcher barons)

The earldom passed to the Crown by escheat in 1237 on the death of John the Scot, Earl of Huntingdon, seventh and last of the Earls. William III de Forz, 4th Earl of Albemarle, claimed the earldom as husband of Christina, the senior co-heir, but the king persuaded them to quitclaim their rights in 1241 in exchange for modest lands elsewhere. The other co-heiresses did likewise. It was annexed to the Crown in 1246. King Henry III then passed the Lordship of Chester, but not the title of Earl, to his son, the Lord Edward, in 1254; as King Edward I, this son in turn conferred the title and lands of the Earldom on his son, Edward, the first English Prince of Wales. By that time, the Earldom of Chester consisted of two counties: Cheshire and Flintshire.

The establishment of royal control of the Earldom of Chester made possible King Edward I's conquest of north Wales, and Chester played a vital part as a supply base during the Welsh Wars (1275–84), so the separate organisation of a county palatine was preserved. This continued until the time of King Henry VIII. Since 1301, the Earldom of Chester has always been conferred on the Princes of Wales.

Briefly promoted to a principality in 1398 by King Richard II, who titled himself "Prince of Chester", it was reduced to an earldom again in 1399 by King Henry IV. Whereas the Sovereign's eldest son is automatically Duke of Cornwall, he must be made or created Earl of Chester as well as Prince of Wales.

The independent palatinate jurisdiction of Chester survived until the time of King Henry VIII (1536), when the earldom was brought more directly under the control of the Crown. The palatinate courts of Great Sessions and Exchequer survived until the reforms of 1830.

The importance of the County Palatinate of Chester is shown by the survival of Chester Herald in the College of Arms for some six hundred years. The office has anciently been nominally under the jurisdiction of Norroy King of Arms.

== Revenues ==
In the year 1377, the revenues of the Earldom were recorded as follows:

=== County of Chester ===
Fee-Farm of city of Chester – £22 2 4 1/2,
Escheated lands of said city – £0 7 0,
Rents of the Manor of Dracklow and Rudeheath – £26 2 6,
Farm of Medywick – £21 6 0,
Profits of Mara and Modren – £34 0 9,
Profits of Shotwick Manor and Park – £23 19 0,
Mills upon River Dee – £11 0 0,
Annual profits of Fordham Manor – £48 0 0,
Profits of Macklefield Hundred – £6 1 8,
Farm of Macklefield Borough – £16 1 3,
Profits of the forest of Macklefield £85 12 11 3/4,
Profits of escheater of Chester – £24 19 0,
Profits of the sheriff of said county – £43 12 3,
Profits of the Chamberlain of county – £55 14 0.

=== County of Flint ===
Yearly value of Ellow – £20 8 0,
Farm of the town of Flint – £33 19 4,
Farm of Cayrouse – £7 2 4,
Castle of Ruthlam – £5 12 10,
Rents and profits of Mosten – £7 0 0,
Rents and profits of Colshil – £54 16 0,
Rents of Ruthlam town – £44 17 6,
Lands of Englefield (yearly) – £23 10 0,
Profits of Vayvol – £5 9 0,
Profits of the office of escheator – £6 11 9,
Mines of Cole and Wood within Manor of Mosten – £0 10 0,
Office of the sheriff in rents and casualties – £120 0 0,
Mines and profits of the Fairs of Northope – £3 9 2,
Casualties was lastly – £37 0 8.

Total income was £418 1 2 3/4 from Cheshire and £181 6 0 from Flintshire.

== List of the Earls of Chester ==
=== First Creation (1070) ===
- 1070–1071 Gerbod the Fleming, 1st Earl of Chester

=== Second Creation (1071) ===
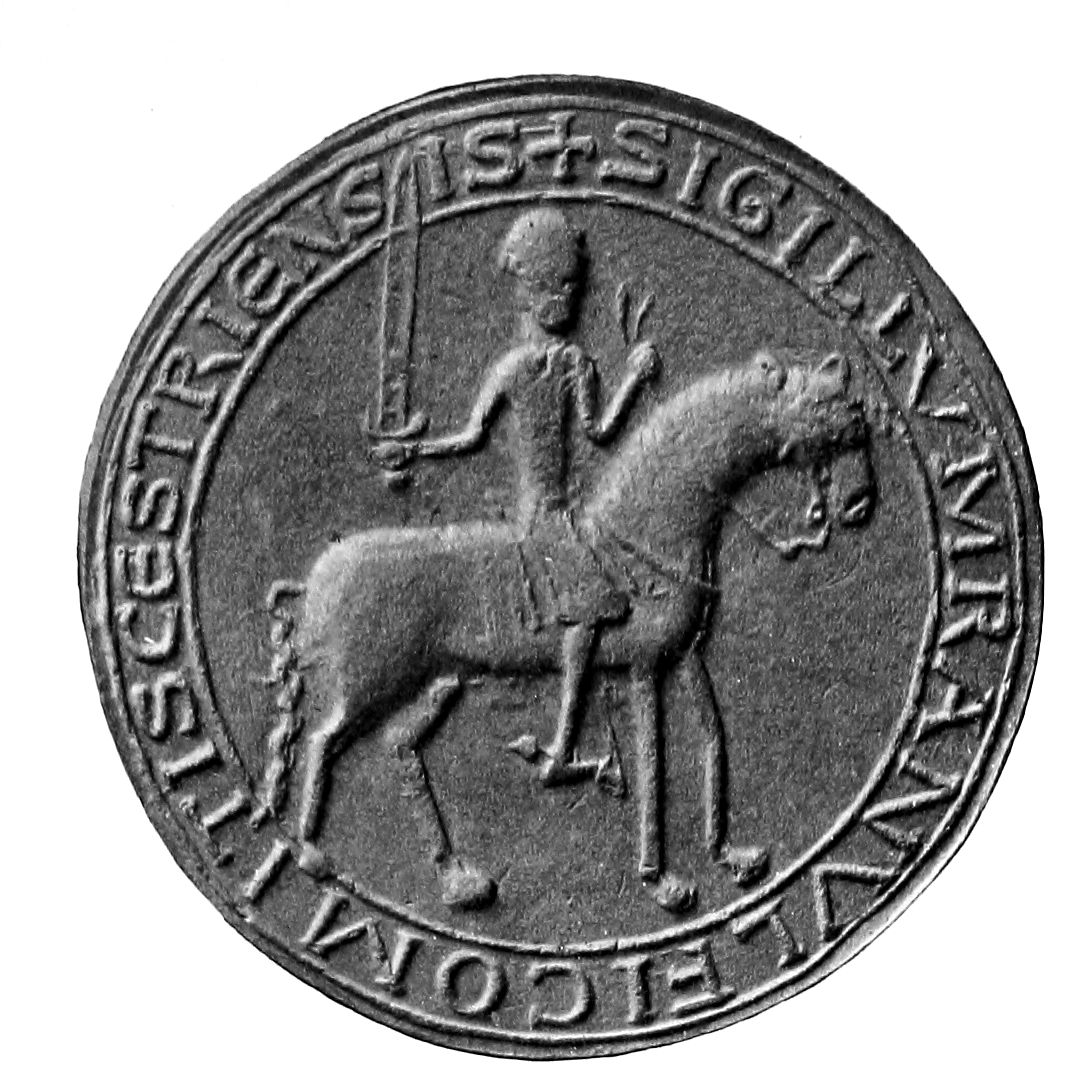
Seal of Ranulf de Gernon, 4th Earl of Chester, with legend SIGILLVM RANVLFI COMITIS CESTRIENSIS, "Seal of Ranulf, Count/Earl of Chester."

- 1071–1101 Hugh d'Avranches, 1st Earl of Chester (c. 1047–1101)
- 1101–1120 Richard d'Avranches, 2nd Earl of Chester (1094–1120)
- 1120–1129 Ranulf le Meschin, 3rd Earl of Chester (1070–1129)
- 1129–1153 Ranulf de Gernon, 4th Earl of Chester (1099–1153)
- 1153–1181 Hugh de Kevelioc, 5th Earl of Chester (1147–1181)
- 1181–1232 Ranulf de Blondeville, 6th Earl of Chester (1170–1232)
- 1232–1232 Matilda of Chester, Countess of Chester suo jure (1171–1233) (inherited October 1232 inter vivos gift to son November 1232)
- 1232–1237 John of Scotland, 7th Earl of Chester (c. 1207–1237)

=== Third Creation (1254) ===
- Edward, Lord of Chester, but without the title of Earl (1239–1307) (became King Edward I in 1272)

=== Fourth Creation (1264) ===
- Simon de Montfort, 6th Earl of Leicester, 1st Earl of Chester (1208–1265) (forfeit 1265)

(There is no evidence that Alphonso, elder son of Edward I, was created Earl of Chester, although he was styled as such.)

=== Fifth Creation (1301) ===
- Edward of Caernarvon, Earl of Chester (1284–1327) (became King Edward II in 1307)

=== Sixth Creation (1312) ===
- Edward Plantagenet, Earl of Chester (1312–1377) (became King Edward III in 1327)

Thereafter, the Earldom of Chester was created in conjunction with the Principality of Wales. See Prince of Wales for further earls of Chester.

== Other associations ==
- Earl of Chester was one of the GWR 3031 Class locomotives that were built for and ran on the Great Western Railway between 1891 and 1915.

== Family tree ==
Family tree of the Princes of Wales, Dukes of Cornwall, Dukes of Rothesay, Earls of Carrick and Earls of Chester

Earl of Chester (1st creation), 1067–1070
Gerbod the Fleming (?); Earl of Chester	Richard Goz (d. after 1082)	King William I (c. 1028–1087)
Earldom of Chester (1st creation) forfeit, 1071
Earl of Chester (2nd creation), 1071
Maud (Margaret)	Hugh d'Avranches (c. 1047–1101); 1st Earl of Chester	Adela of Normandy (c. 1067–1137)	Stephen, Count of Blois (c. 1045–1102)	King Henry I (c. 1068–1135)
Ranulf le Meschin (1070–1129); 3rd Earl of Chester	Richard d'Avranches (1094–1120); 2nd Earl of Chester	Lucia-Mahaut (d. 1120)	Robert Rufus (c. 1090–1147); Earl of Gloucester
Ranulf de Gernon (1099–1153); 4th Earl of Chester	Maud (Matilda) of Gloucester (d. 1189)
Hugh of Cyfeiliog (1147–1181); 5th Earl of Chester
Ranulf de Blondeville (1170–1232); 6th Earl of Chester, Earl of Lincoln	Matilda (Maud) (1171–1233); Countess of Chester suo jure
Earl of Chester (4th creation), 1264
John of Scotland (c. 1207–1237); 7th Earl of Chester, Earl of Huntingdon	Simon de Montfort (1208–1265); Earl of Chester, Earl of Leicester
Earldom of Chester (2nd creation) reverted to the crown, 1237	Earl of Chester (3rd creation), 1254	Earldom of Chester (4th creation) forfeit, 1265
Edward, Lord of Chester (1239–1307); Earl of Chester (without the title of Earl), later King Edward I
Earldom of Chester (3rd creation) reverted to the crown, 1272
Earl of Chester (5th creation), 1301
Edward of Caernarfon (1284–1327); Prince of Wales and Earl of Chester; 1301–1307, later King Edward II
Earldom of Chester (5th creation) reverted to the crown, 1307
Earl of Chester (6th creation), 1312
Robert Stewart (1316–1390); Earl of Carrick (1316–1368), later King Robert II of Scots	Edward Plantagenet (1312–1377); Earl of Chester (1312–1327), later King Edward III
Hereafter, the Earldom of Chester was created in conjunction with the Principality of Wales.
Duke of Cornwall, 1337
John Stewart (1337–1406); Earl of Carrick (1368–1390), later King Robert III of Scots	Edward the Black Prince (1330–1376); Duke of Cornwall (1337–1376), Prince of Wales (1343–1376)	John of Gaunt (1340–1399); Duke of Lancaster	Lionel of Antwerp (1338–1368); Duke of Clarence	Edmund of Langley (1341–1402); Duke of York
Dukedom of Cornwall extinct, 1376
Duke of Cornwall, 1376
Richard of Bordeaux (1367–1400); Prince of Wales (1376–1377), Duke of Cornwall (1376–1377), later King Richard II	John Beaufort (c. 1371–1410)	King Henry IV (1366–1413)	Philippa of Clarence (1355–1382)
Dukedom of Cornwall merged in the Crown, 1377
Roger Mortimer (1374–1398)
Duke of Rothesay created, 1398	Duke of Cornwall restored, 1399
David Stewart (1378–1402); Earl of Carrick (1390–1402); Duke of Rothesay (1398–1402)	Henry of Monmouth (1386–1422); Prince of Wales (1399–1413), Duke of Cornwall (1399–1413), later King Henry V	Anne de Mortimer (1390–1411)	Richard of Conisburgh (c. 1375–1415); Earl of Cambridge
Duke of Cornwall, 1460
James (1394–1437); Earl of Carrick (1402–1406); Duke of Rothesay (1404–1406), later King James I of Scots	Joan Beaufort (c. 1404–1445)	John Beaufort (1404–1444); Duke of Somerset	Henry (1421–1471); Duke of Cornwall (1421–1422), later King Henry VI	Richard Plantagenet (1411–1460); Duke of York; Prince of Wales (1460), Duke of Cornwall (1460)
Alexander Stewart (1430); Duke of Rothesay (1430)	James (1430–1460); Duke of Rothesay (1431–1437), later King James II of Scots	Margaret Beaufort (1443–1509)	King Edward IV (1442–1483)	King Richard III (1452–1485)
James (1451–1488); Duke of Rothesay (1452–1460), later King James III of Scots	King Henry VII (1457–1509)	Edward of Westminster (1453–1471); Prince of Wales (1454–1471), Duke of Cornwall (1454–1471)
From the 1469 Act of Scottish Parliament, the Earldom of Carrick and the Dukedom of Rothesay was to be automatically held by the "first-born Prince of the King of Scots."
James (1473–1513); Duke of Rothesay (1473–1488), later King James IV of Scots	Margaret Tudor (1489–1541)	Arthur Tudor (1486–1502); Prince of Wales (1489–1502), Duke of Cornwall (1486–1502)	Henry Tudor (1491–1547); Prince of Wales (1504–1509), Duke of Cornwall (1502–1509), later King Henry VIII	Edward (1470–1483); Prince of Wales (1471–1483), Duke of Cornwall (1471–1483), later King Edward V	Edward of Middleham (c. 1473–1484); Prince of Wales (1483–1484), Duke of Cornwall (1483–1484)
James Stewart (1507–1508); Duke of Rothesay (1507–1508)	Arthur Stewart (1509–1510); Duke of Rothesay (1509–1510)	James (1512–1542); Duke of Rothesay (1512–1513), later King James V of Scots	Henry (1511); Duke of Cornwall (1511)	Edward Tudor (1537–1553); Prince of Wales (1537–1547), Duke of Cornwall (1537–1547), later King Edward VI
James Stewart (1540–1541); Duke of Rothesay (1540–1541)	Mary, Queen of Scots (1542–1587)
James Charles Stuart (1566–1625); Duke of Rothesay (1566–1567), later King James VI/I
Henry Frederick Stuart (1594–1612); Prince of Wales (1610–1612), Duke of Cornwall (1603–1612), Duke of Rothesay (1594–1612)	Elizabeth Stuart (1596–1662)	Charles Stuart (1600–1649); Prince of Wales (1616–1625), Duke of Cornwall (1612–1625), Duke of Rothesay (1612–1625), later King Charles I
Sophia of Hanover (1630–1714)	Charles James (1629); Duke of Cornwall (1629), Duke of Rothesay (1629), styled Prince of Wales	Charles Stuart (1630–1685); Prince of Wales (c. 1638/1641–1649), Duke of Cornwall (1630–1649), Duke of Rothesay (1630–1649), later King Charles II	King James II/VII (1633–1701)
King George I (1660–1727)
George Augustus (1683–1760); Prince of Wales (1714–1727), Duke of Cornwall (1714–1727), Duke of Rothesay (1714–1727), later King George II	James Francis Edward Stuart (1688–1766); Prince of Wales (c. 1688–1688), Duke of Cornwall (1688–1702), Duke of Rothesay (1688–1702)
Frederick Louis (1707–1751); Prince of Wales (1729–1751), Duke of Cornwall (1727–1751), Duke of Rothesay (1727–1751)
George William Frederick (1738–1820); Prince of Wales (1751–1760), later King George III
George Augustus Frederick (1762–1830); Prince of Wales (1762–1820), Duke of Cornwall (1762–1820), Duke of Rothesay (1762–1820), later King George IV	Edward Augustus (1767–1820); Duke of Kent and Strathearn
Queen Victoria (1819–1901)
Albert Edward (1841–1910); Prince of Wales (1841–1901), Duke of Cornwall (1841–1901), Duke of Rothesay (1841–1901), later King Edward VII
George Frederick Ernest Albert (1865–1936); Prince of Wales (1901–1910), Duke of Cornwall (1901–1910), Duke of Rothesay (1901–1910), later King George V
Edward Albert Christian George Andrew Patrick David (1894–1972); Prince of Wales (1910–1936), Duke of Cornwall (1910–1936), Duke of Rothesay (1910–1936), later King Edward VIII, later Duke of Windsor	King George VI (1895–1952)
Queen Elizabeth II (1926–2022)
Charles Philip Arthur George (b. 1948); Prince of Wales (1958–2022), Duke of Cornwall (1952–2022), Duke of Rothesay (1952–2022), later King Charles III
William Arthur Philip Louis (b. 1982); Prince of Wales (since 2022), Duke of Cornwall (since 2022), Duke of Rothesay (since 2022), Duke of Cambridge
Prince George of Wales (b. 2013)

== See also ==
- History of Cheshire
- Constable of Chester
- Countess of Chester, a subsidiary title of the Princess of Wales
