= Richard le Goz =

11th-century Norman nobleman

Richard le Goz (died 1082 or after) was a Norman nobleman and supporter of William the Conqueror in the Norman conquest of England.

== Life ==
Richard was the son of Thorstein or Thurstan le Goz, Viscount of Hiesmes, and grandson of Ansfred 'the Dane', Viscount of Hiesmes. William II, Duke of Normandy, bestowed on him the title of Viscount of Avranches sometime before 1046. Richard may also have been Lord of Creully and entrusted with the castle of Saint-James-de-Beuvron, built by William in 1067 shortly after the war against the Bretons of 1064–66.

Richard provided 60 ships to support William's 1066 invasion of England but is not among those known to have been present at the Battle of Hastings. Between 1070 and 1079, Richard was involved in a ruling between Raoul Tesson and the Abbey of Fontenay. Around 1076 he was one of the judges who pronounced an award against Robert Bertram.

Richard married Emma, who is believed to have been the daughter of Herluin de Conteville and Herleva (mistress of Robert I of Normandy and mother of William the Conqueror), and hence a sister of Robert, Count of Mortain and Odo, Bishop of Bayeux. Richard and Emma had five known children and probably more:

- Hugh d'Avranches, Earl of Chester and Viscount of Avranches
- Helisende, married to William II, Count of Eu
- Gilbert d'Avranches, Lord of Marcey
- Margaret, married to Ranulf de Briquessart. Their son was Ranulf le Meschin, 3rd Earl of Chester
- Judith, married to Richer de l'Aigle (died in the Battle of Sainte-Suzanne).

Richard le Goz died in 1082 and was succeeded by his son Hugh as Viscount of Avranches.

== Sources ==
- Johns, Susan M. (2003). Noblewomen, Aristocracy and Power in the Twelfth-Century Anglo-Norman Realm (Gender in History). Manchester University Press.
- Power, Daniel (2007). The Norman Frontier in the Twelfth and Early Thirteenth Centuries. Cambridge University Press.
