= Hugh d'Avranches, 1st Earl of Chester =

Anglo-Norman nobleman (c. 1047–1101)

Hugh d'Avranches
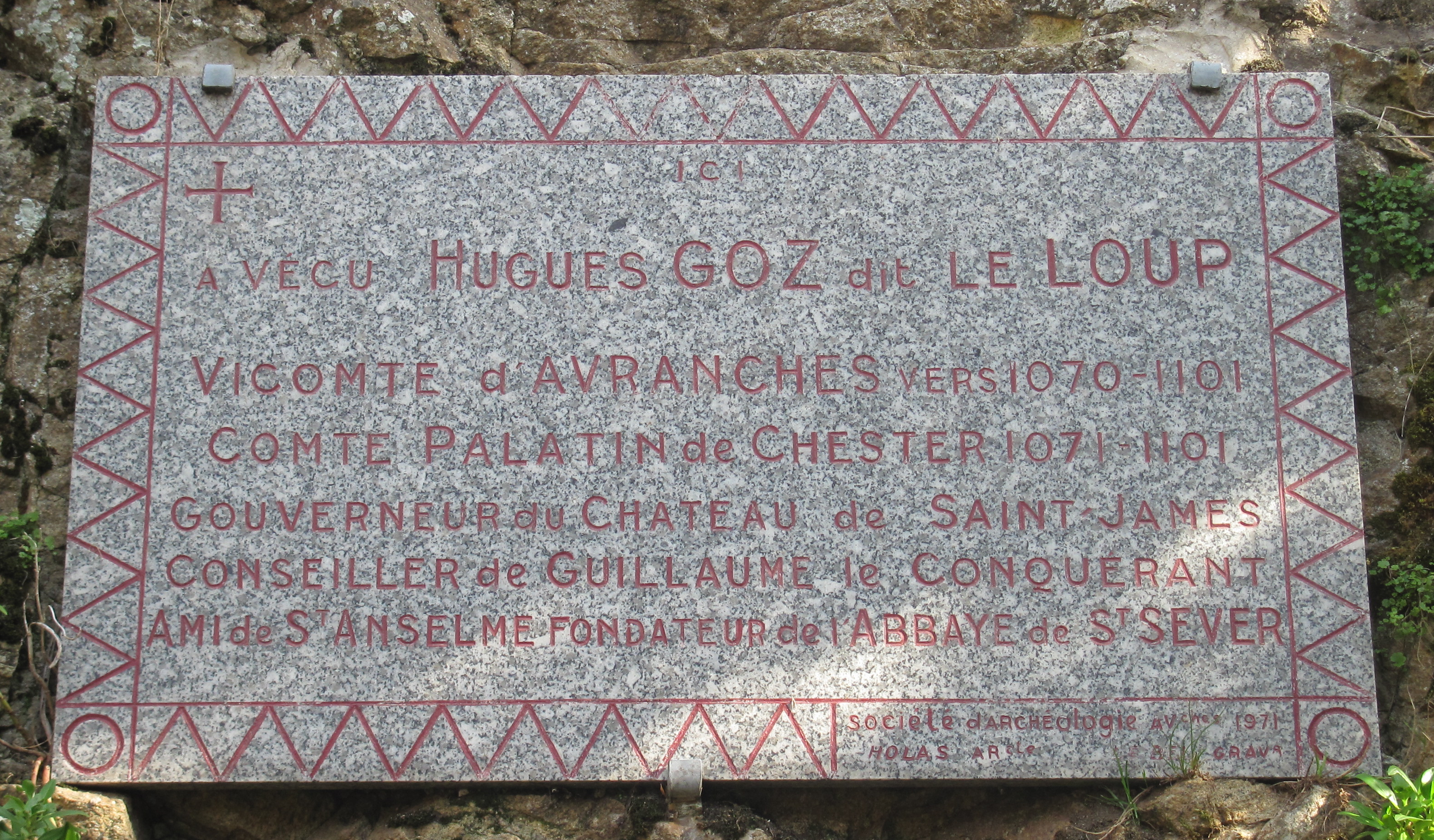
- Plaque commemorating Hugh d'Avranches in Avranches, Normandy
- Born: c. 1047; Normandy
- Died: 27 July 1101
- Resting place: St Werburgh's Abbey, Chester
- Other names: le Gros (the Large); Lupus (Wolf)
- Title: Earl of Chester (2nd creation)
- Term: 1071–1101
- Predecessor: Gerbod the Fleming, 1st Earl of Chester (1st creation)
- Successor: Richard d'Avranches
- Spouse: Ermentrude of Claremont
- Children: Richard d'Avranches
- Parent: Richard le Goz, Viscount of Avranches

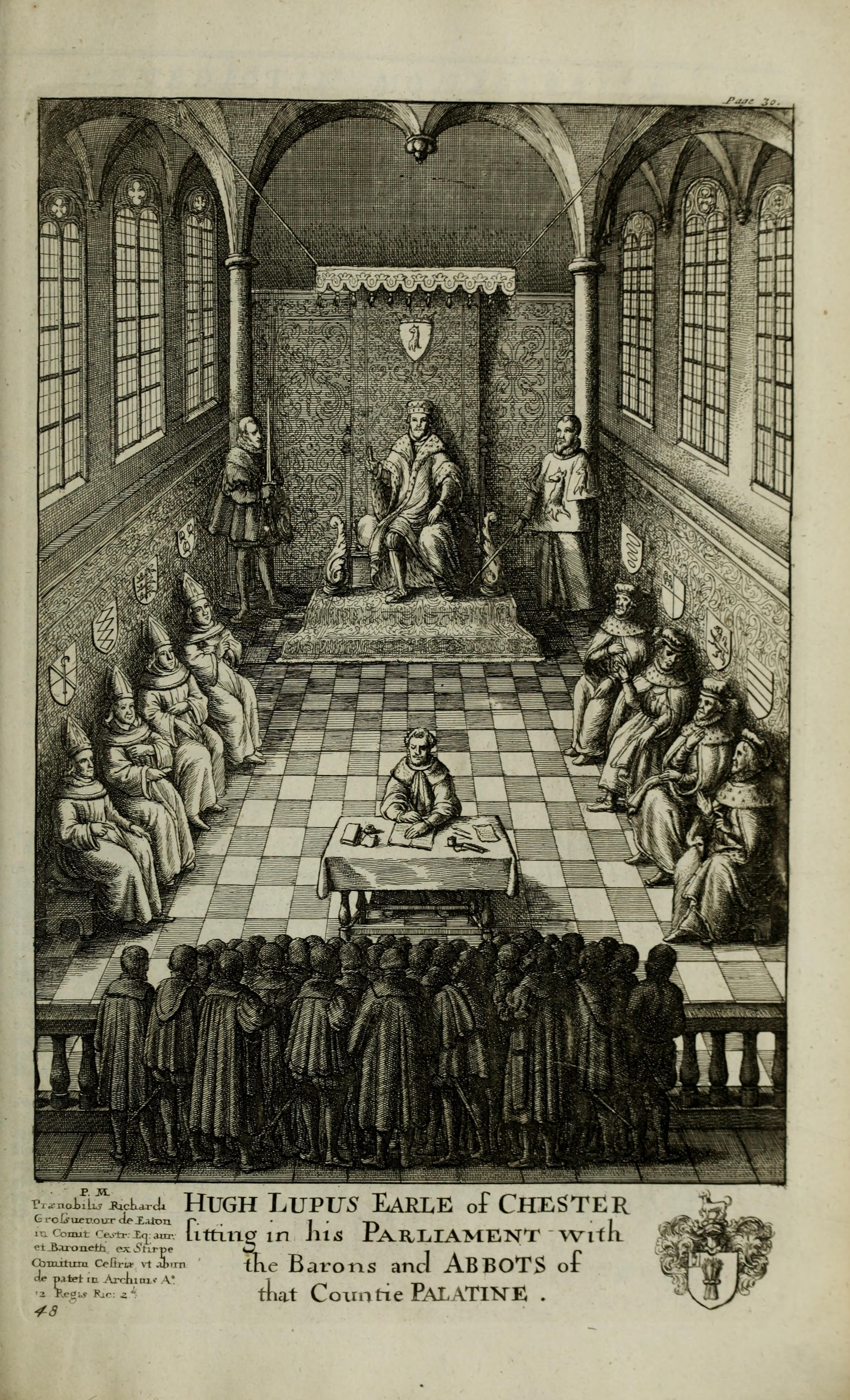
"Hugh Lupus, Earle of Chester, sitting in his parliament with the barons and abbots of that Countie Palatine". Post-1656 engraving by Wenceslaus Hollar

Hugh d'Avranches (c. 1047 – 27 July 1101), nicknamed le Gros (the Large) or Lupus (the Wolf), was from 1071 the second Norman Earl of Chester and one of the great magnates of early Norman England.

== Early life and career ==
Hugh d'Avranches was born around 1047 as the son of Richard le Goz, Viscount of Avranches. His mother was traditionally said to have been Emma de Conteville, half-sister of William the Conqueror, but Lewis (2014) states that the identification was made "on the basis of unsatisfactory evidence" and that his mother is unknown. Keats-Rohan (1999), while accepting the poor quality of the evidence for the traditional account, has nonetheless argued in favour of some relationship existing between Hugh and William.

== Earl of Chester ==
In 1071, Gerbod the Fleming, 1st Earl of Chester was taken prisoner at the Battle of Cassel in France and held in captivity. Taking advantage of the circumstances, the king declared his title vacant. Cheshire, with its strategic location on the Welsh Marches, held county palatine status and the king then granted these powers to Hugh along with the earldom. In that role he would appoint a number of hereditary barons, including his cousins Robert of Rhuddlan and Nigel of Cotentin.

He also received many of the local manors held by Edwin, the last Saxon earl of Mercia (died 1071).

After his father's death, as late as 1082, Hugh succeeded his father as Viscount of Avranches, and inherited large estates, not just in the Avranchin but scattered throughout western Normandy. The earl regarded the Benedictine monk and theologian St Anselm to be his friend and, during his lifetime, founded the Benedictine Abbeys of Sainte-Marie-et-Saint-Sever, Saint-Sever-Calvados, Normandy, and St. Werburgh in Chester as well as giving land endowments to Whitby Abbey, North Yorkshire. Hugh remained loyal to King William II during the rebellion of 1088. He later served Henry I as one of his principal councillors at the royal court.

== Wales ==
Hugh spent much of his time fighting with his neighbours in Wales. Together with Robert of Rhuddlan, he subdued a good part of northern Wales. Initially, Robert held north-east Wales as a vassal of the tenant-in-chief. In 1081 Gruffudd ap Cynan, King of Gwynedd was captured through the treachery of one of his own men at a meeting near Corwen. Gruffudd was imprisoned by Earl Hugh in his castle at Chester, but it was Robert who took over his kingdom, holding it directly en liege from the king. When Robert was killed by a Welsh raiding party in 1093 Hugh took over these lands, becoming ruler of most of North Wales, but he lost Anglesey and much of the rest of Gwynedd in the Welsh revolt of 1094, led by Gruffudd ap Cynan, who had escaped from captivity.

== Norwegian invasion ==
In the summer of 1098, Hugh joined forces with Hugh of Montgomery, 2nd Earl of Shrewsbury, to relieve besieged castles, pillage Môn, and recover his losses in Gwynedd. Gruffudd ap Cynan had retreated to Anglesey, but then was forced to flee to Ireland when a fleet he had hired from the Danish settlement in Ireland changed sides. Things were altered by the arrival of a Norwegian fleet under the command of King Magnus III of Norway, also known as Magnus Barefoot, who attacked the Norman forces near the eastern end of the Menai Straits. Earl Hugh of Shrewsbury was killed by an arrow said to have been shot by Magnus himself. The Normans were obliged to evacuate Anglesey altogether leaving Gruffudd, who had returned from Ireland, to take possession the following year. Hugh apparently made an agreement with him and did not again try to recover these lands.

== Marriage, death and succession ==
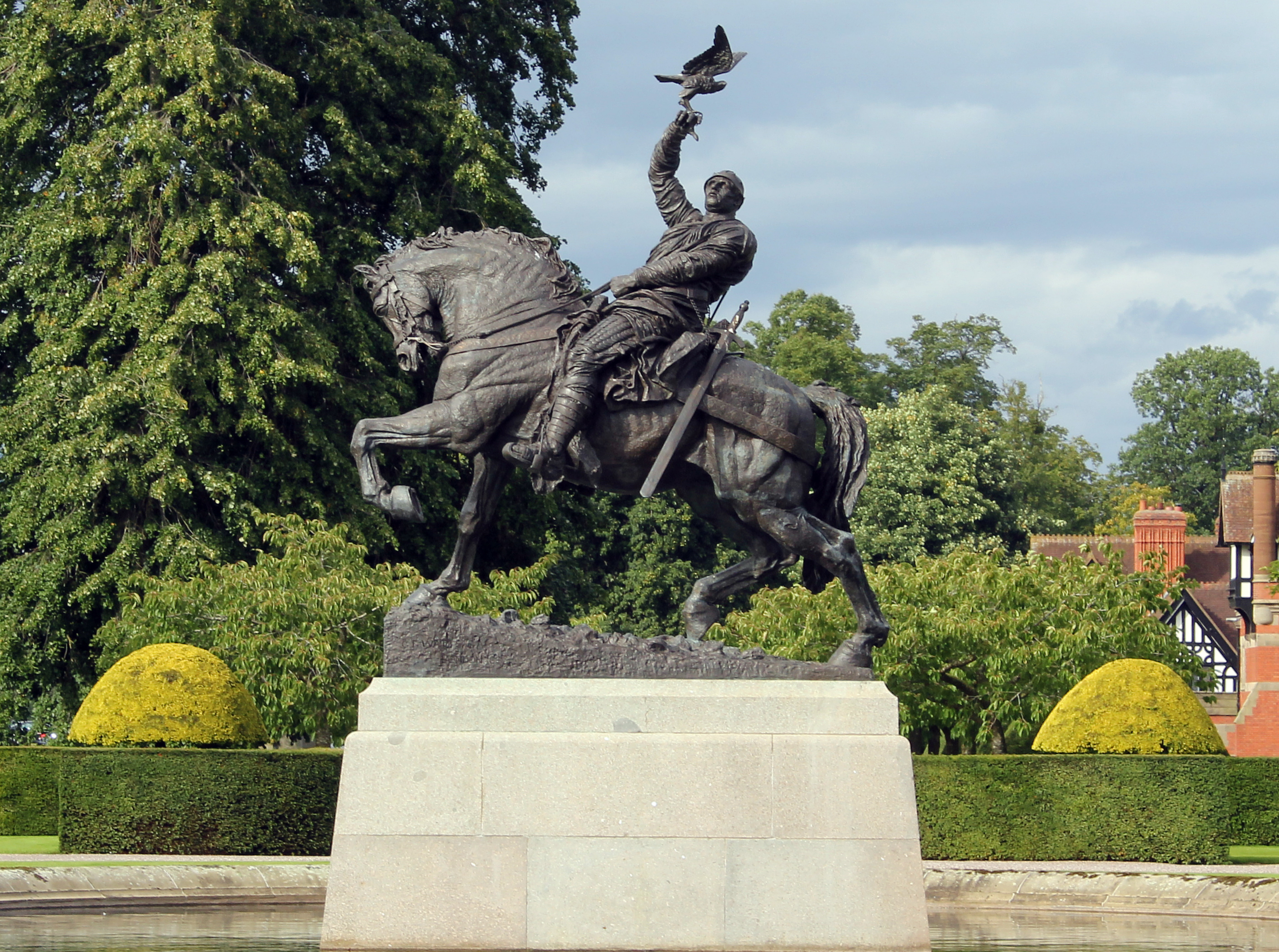
Equestrian statue of Hugh Lupus hawking on horseback, at Eaton Hall in Cheshire, sculpted by George Frederick Watts (1817–1904)

Hugh d'Avranches married Ermentrude of Claremont, daughter of Hugh I, Count of Clermont-en-Beauvaisis, by whom he had his son and heir, Richard d'Avranches, 2nd Earl of Chester, though he is known to have also had illegitimate children, including Robert, abbot of Bury St Edmunds, Otuer fitz Count and, less certainly, Geva, wife of Geoffrey Ridel.

Hugh fell ill and on 13 July 1101 became a monk at his religious foundation of St. Werburgh, dying there four days later on 17 July 1101. He was succeeded as Earl of Chester by his son Richard, who married Matilda of Blois, a granddaughter of William the Conqueror. Both Richard and Matilda died in the disastrous sinking of the White Ship in 1120, and the Earldom then passed to Hugh's nephew Ranulph le Meschin, Earl of Chester, son of his sister Margaret by her husband Ranulf de Briquessart, Viscount of Bayeux.

Hugh would be remembered for his "gluttony, prodigality and profligacy". His obesity gave rise to his nickname, le Gros (the Fat). He would also posthumously be called Lupus (Wolf) for reasons still debated.

== See also ==
- List of earls in the reign of William the Conqueror

== Sources ==
- Johns, Susan M. (2003). Noblewomen, Aristocracy and Power in the Twelfth-Century Anglo-Norman Realm (Gender in History). Manchester University Press.
- Moore, David (1996). "Gruffudd ap Cynan and the mediaeval Welsh polity". In Maund, K.L. (ed.). Gruffudd Ap Cynan: A Collaborative Biography. The Boydell Press. pp. 1–60. ISBN 9780851153896.
- Webster, Paul, ed. (2021). History of the Dukes of Normandy and the Kings of England by the Anonymous of Béthune. Taylor & Francis. ISBN 9781351723015.

Peerage of England
New creation	Earl of Chester; 1071–1101	Succeeded by Richard d'Avranches
