= Prince of Wales =

British royal title (formerly a native Welsh title)

- Tywysog Cymru
- Prince of Wales's feathers

- Personal standard

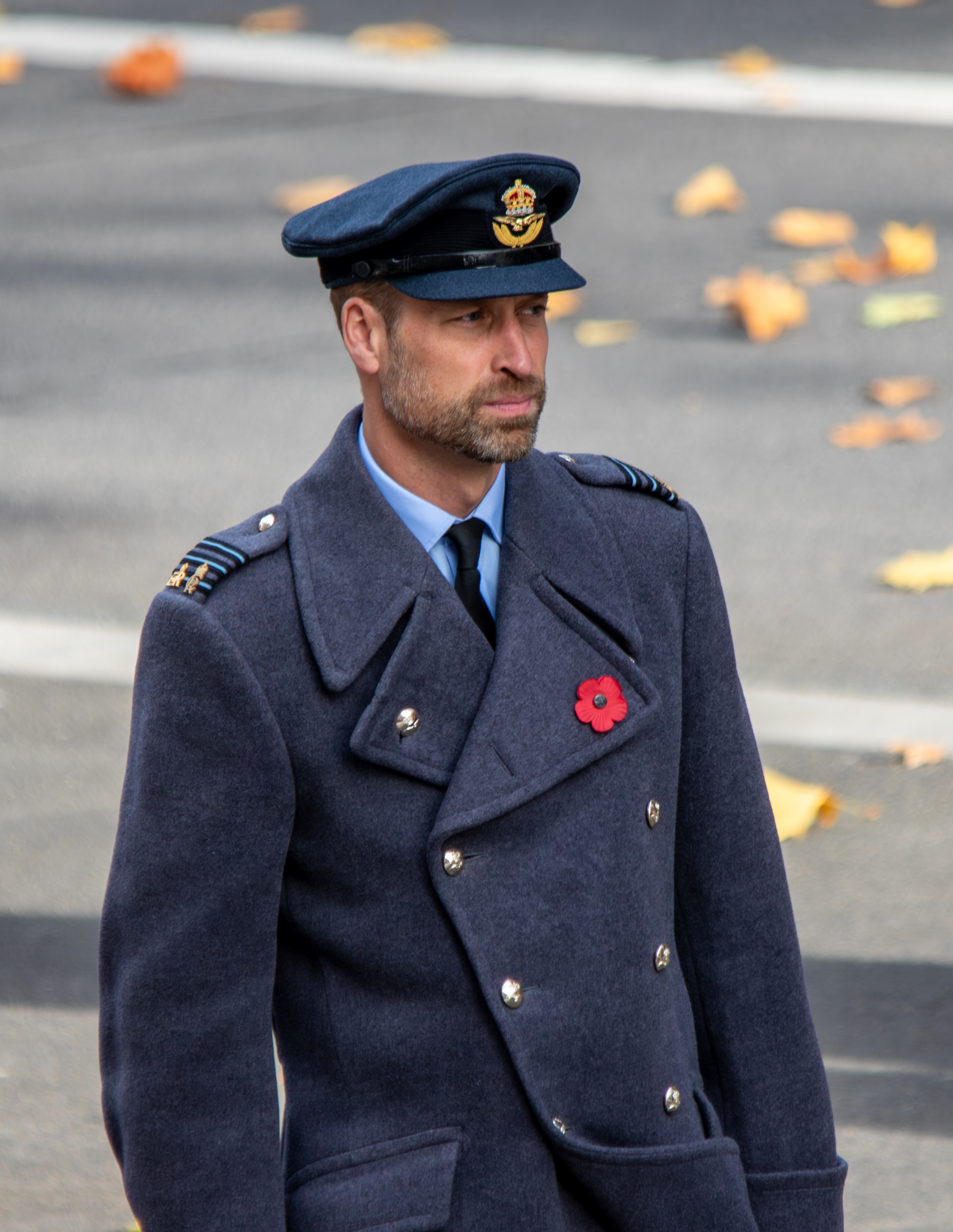
- Incumbent; William since 9 September 2022
- Style: His Royal Highness
- Member of: British royal family
- Appointer: Monarch of the United Kingdom (previously of England)
- Term length: Life tenure or until accession as sovereign
- Formation: 1165 (Welsh title); 1301 (English/British title)
- First holder: Owain Gwynedd (Welsh title); Edward of Caernarfon (English/British title)

Prince of Wales (Note: Welsh: Tywysog Cymru, pronounced [təu̯ˈəsoɡ ˈkəmrɨ]; Latin: Princeps Cambriae/Walliae) is a title traditionally given to the male heir apparent to the English, and later, the British throne. The title originated with the Welsh rulers of Gwynedd who, from the late 12th century, used it (albeit inconsistently) to assert their supremacy over the other Welsh rulers. However, to mark the finalisation of his conquest of Wales, in 1301, Edward I of England invested his son Edward of Caernarfon with the title, thereby beginning the tradition of giving the title to the heir apparent when he was the monarch's son or grandson. The title was later claimed by the leader of a Welsh rebellion, Owain Glyndŵr, from 1400 until 1415.

King Charles III created his son, William, Prince of Wales on 9 September 2022, the day after his accession to the throne, with formal letters patent issued on 13 February 2023. The title has become a point of controversy in Wales.

== Welsh princes of Wales ==
=== Origins to 1283 ===
The first known use of the title "Prince of Wales" (Note: The term used was Princeps Walliarum ("Prince of the Waleses") as the document was in Latin. However, the form of address in letters Owain received from Thomas Becket and Pope Alexander III suggests that by 1169 he was also using the titles Princeps Wallie ("Prince of Wales") and Wallensium Princeps ("Prince of the Welsh").) was in the 1160s by Owain Gwynedd, ruler of Gwynedd, in a letter to Louis VII of France. In the 12th century, Wales was a patchwork of Anglo-Norman Lordships and native Welsh principalities – notably Deheubarth, Powys and Gwynedd – competing among themselves for hegemony. Owain's aim in using the title in his letter to Louis was probably to claim pre-eminence over the other native Welsh rulers.

Following Owain's death in 1170 no other ruler, with the exception of Rhys ap Gruffydd of Deheubarth, is known to have adopted the title until 1245. Rhys used several titles, sometimes concurrently, and in two charters from the 1180s he is referred to as "Prince of Wales" or "Prince of the Welsh". The title was revived in 1245 when Dafydd ap Llywelyn, ruler of Gwynedd, began using it in the final months of his reign. In the intervening years, Owen Gwynedd's successors in Gwynedd, including Dafydd, had, instead, adopted the titles "Prince of North Wales" or "Prince of Aberffraw and Lord of Snowdon".

However, it was in the reign of Llywelyn ap Gruffudd, Dafydd's nephew and successor in Gwynedd, that the title is consistently used over an extended period. From 1262 (Note: From his accession in 1246 until 1262, Llywelyn appears to have avoided using any title. Instead, he adopted a style in formal documents that only referenced his descent from Gruffudd ap Llywelyn ap Iorwerth. However, he briefly changed this approach in 1258 when, in an agreement between the Scottish and Welsh Lords, he used the title 'Prince of Wales' for the first time.) to his death in 1282, Llywelyn used no other style except 'Prince of Wales and Lord of Snowdon'. This was accompanied by Llywelyn making the Principality of Wales (encompassing Gwynedd, Deheubarth, Powys and parts of the Marches) a political reality. He had achieved this by significantly expanding his directly ruled territories into Mid- and South Wales and inducing all the other remaining native Welsh rulers to do him homage and acknowledge him as overlord by 1263. Additionally, Llywelyn developed governance structures which made his authority effective across the entire Principality of Wales, including in the territories of the Welsh rulers that owed him allegiance. The significance of these developments was marked by Henry III of England recognising Llywelyn's title and authority in the Treaty of Montgomery of 1267. As J. Beverley Smith has noted, his title "at once, acknowledged and proclaimed a status unique in Welsh political history".

Llywelyn's principality was destroyed as a result of the conquest of Wales by Edward I between 1277 and 1283, during which Llywelyn was killed in 1282. After his death, his brother, Dafydd, adopted Llywelyn's title and continued resistance for a few months. However, Dafydd was defeated and executed in 1283 and the principality was permanently annexed by Edward I.

=== Post-conquest claimants ===
In the fourteenth century, two pretenders to the title of 'Prince of Wales' attempted to make good their claims: Owain Lawgoch, a descendant of the Princes of Gwynedd, and Owain Glyndŵr, whose ancestors included the former rulers of Powys and Deheubarth. (Note: In 1294, Madog ap Llywelyn had led a rebellion against English rule in North Wales, during which there is evidence that he used the title "Prince of Wales" in one document.) Owain Lawgoch's abortive attempt at invading Wales in 1372 was followed by Glyndŵr's much more serious revolt beginning in 1400.

Glyndŵr's rebellion commenced with his supporters proclaiming him Prince of Wales. However, it is unclear how important this was in his initial objectives, given that his immediate motivation appears to have been a personal grievance with a neighbouring English Lord. By 1401, he had effectively dropped his claim to the title. But, with the rebellion's military successes of 1402–1403 and the growth in his support in Wales, he became more ambitious. In 1404, he had himself crowned as Prince of Wales, and he launched plans to create the state institutions of a new principality. This phase of the revolt was short-lived, however. By 1406, the rebellion began to fail militarily, and, from 1409, Glyndŵr had to exchange the trappings of a ruling prince for those of a hunted outlaw. He died in obscurity, probably around 1415.

== Heirs apparent to the English or British thrones ==
=== Titles and roles ===
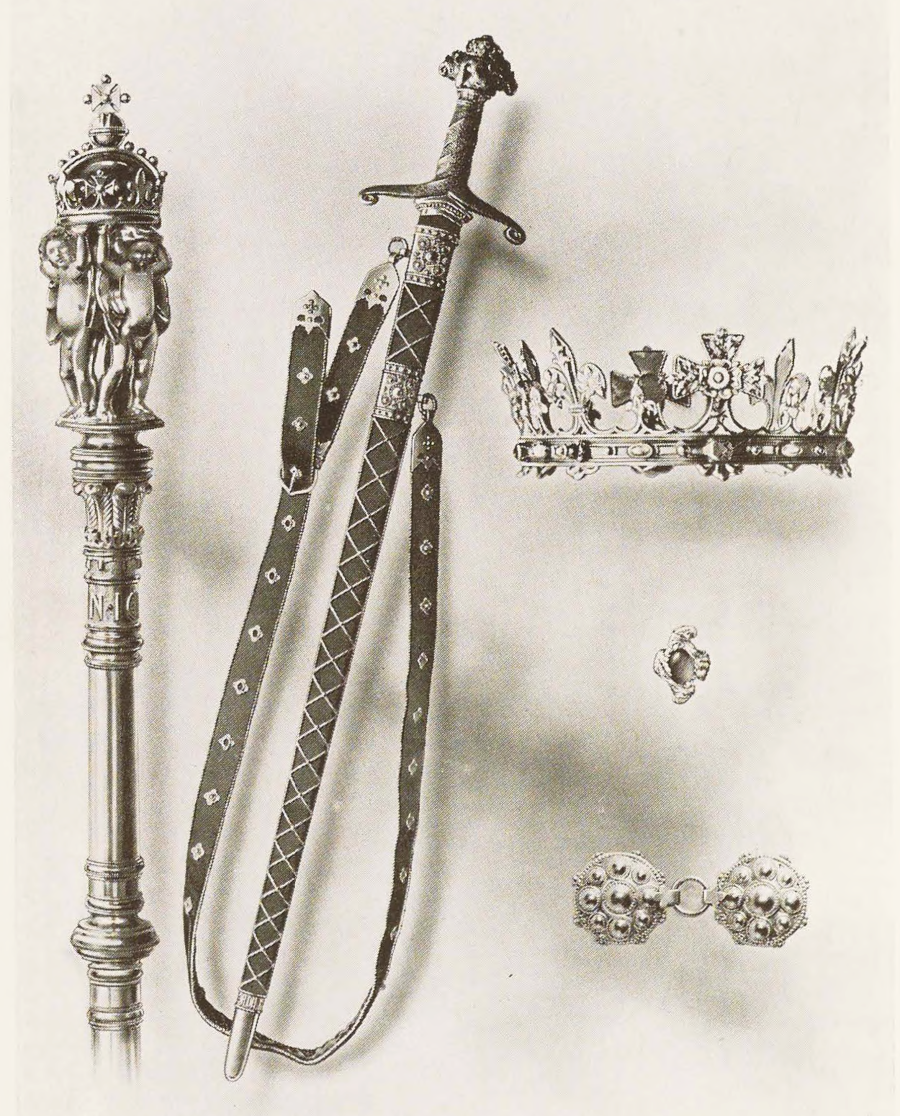
Depiction of the "Honours of the Principality of Wales" created in 1911 for the investiture of Edward (later Edward VIII).

The title is neither automatic nor heritable; it merges with the Crown when its holder eventually accedes to the throne, or reverts to the Crown if its holder predeceases the current monarch, leaving the sovereign free to grant it to the new heir apparent (such as the late prince's son or brother).

The Prince of Wales usually has other titles and honours, if the eldest son of the monarch:

- Since 1301, the title 'Earl of Chester' has generally been granted to each heir apparent to the English throne, and from the late 14th century it has been given only in conjunction with that of 'Prince of Wales'. Both titles are bestowed to each individual by the sovereign and are not automatically acquired.
- Typically the prince is also Duke of Cornwall. Unlike the title Prince of Wales, this inherently includes lands and constitutional and operational responsibilities. The duchy of Cornwall was created in 1337 by Edward III for his son and heir, Edward of Woodstock (also known as 'The Black Prince'). A charter was also created which ruled that the eldest son of the king would be the Duke of Cornwall.

No formal public role or responsibility has been legislated by Parliament or otherwise delegated to the prince of Wales by law or custom. In that role, Charles often assisted Elizabeth II in the performance of her duties. He represented her when welcoming dignitaries to London and during state visits. He also represented the Queen and the United Kingdom overseas at state and ceremonial occasions such as funerals. The Prince of Wales has also been granted the authority to issue royal warrants.

In 2011, along with the other Commonwealth realms, the United Kingdom committed to the Perth Agreement, which proposed changes to the laws governing succession, including altering the male-preference primogeniture to absolute primogeniture. The Succession to the Crown Act 2013 was introduced to the British parliament on 12 December 2012, published the next day, and received royal assent on 25 April 2013. It was brought into force on 26 March 2015, at the same time as the other realms implemented the Perth Agreement in their own laws.

=== Insignia ===
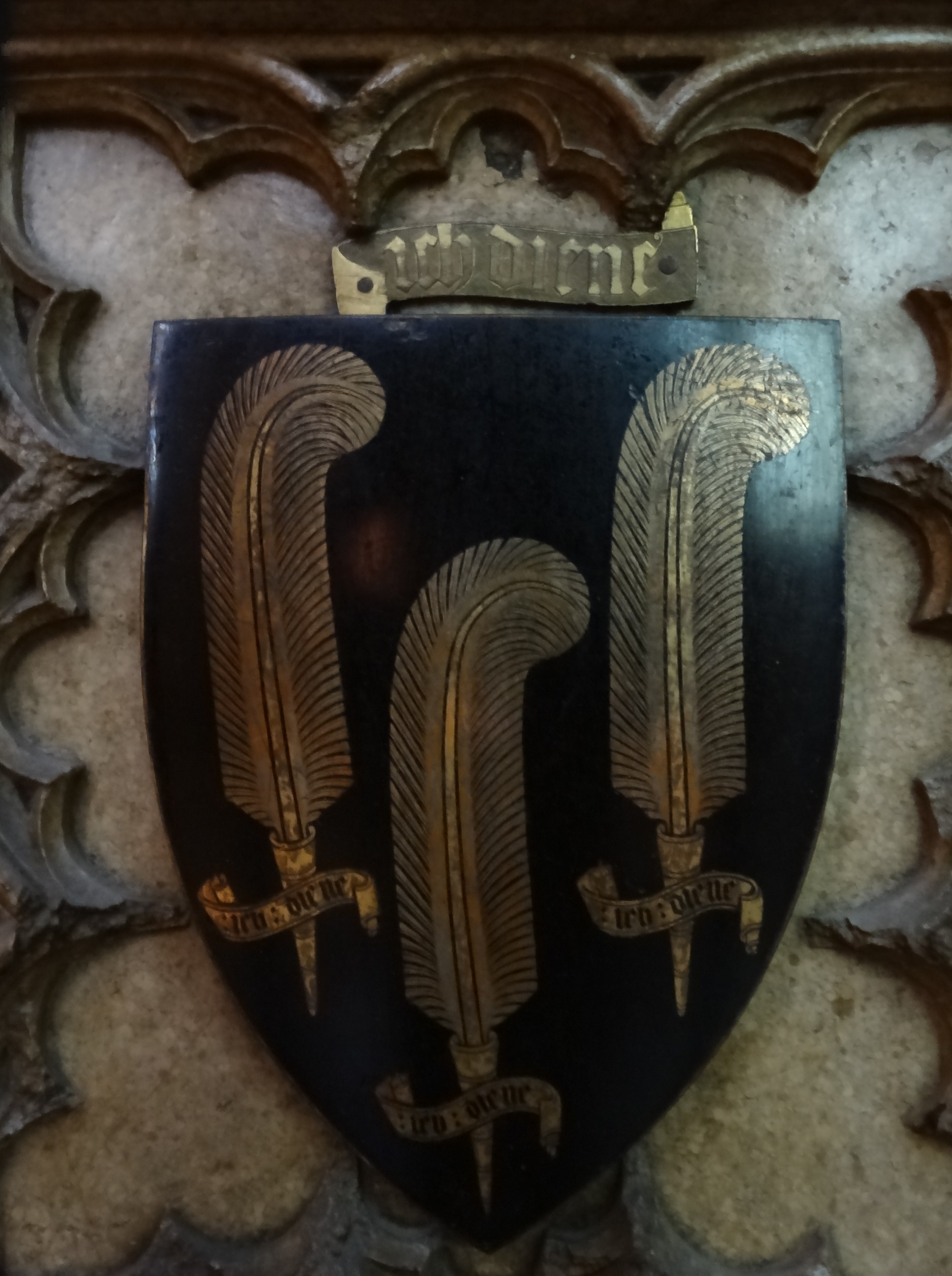
Arms of English heir apparent, Edward the Black Prince in Canterbury Cathedral

The Prince of Wales's feathers are the badge of the Prince of Wales by virtue of being the heir apparent. The ostrich feathers are generally traced back to Edward of Woodstock ('The Black Prince'). He bore (as an alternative to his differenced royal arms) a shield of Sable, three ostrich feathers argent, described as his "shield for peace", probably meaning the shield he used for jousting. These arms appear several times on his chest tomb in Canterbury Cathedral, alternating with his paternal royal arms (the royal arms of King Edward III differenced by a label of three points argent). The Black Prince also used heraldic badges of one or more ostrich feathers in various other contexts.

== Selected events and anomalies ==
=== First English Prince of Wales ===
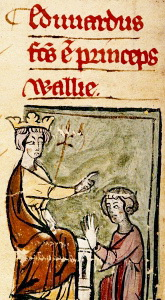
Edward I of England creating his son as "Prince of Wales" at the Lincoln parliament, England (14th century depiction)

In order to finalise his conquest of Wales, Edward I began the custom of granting the title of Prince of Wales to the heir apparent to the English throne. Consequently, on 7 February 1301, Edward invested his Welsh-born eldest son, Edward of Caernarfon, as the first Plantagenet Prince of Wales.

Writing in Britannia, William Camden describes the killing of Llywelyn and Edward's use of the title "Prince of Wales" for his son:

As concerning the Princes of Wales of British bloud in ancient times, you may reade in the Historie of Wales published in print. For my part I thinke it requisite and pertinent to my intended purpose to set downe summarily those of latter daies, descended from the roiall line of England. King Edward the First, unto whom his father King Henrie the Third had granted the Principalitie of Wales, when hee had obtained the Crowne and Lhewellin Ap Gryffith, the last Prince of the British race, was slain, and therby the sinewes as it were of the principalitie were cut, in the twelft yeere of his reigne united the same unto the Kingdome of England. And the whole province sware fealty and alleageance unto Edward of Caernarvon his sonne, whom hee made Prince of Wales. But King Edward the Second conferred not upon his sonne Edward the title of Prince of Wales, but onely the name of Earle of Chester and of Flint, so farre as ever I could learne out of the Records, and by that title summoned him to Parliament, being then nine yeres old. King Edward the Third first created his eldest sonne Edward surnamed the Blacke Prince, the Mirour of Chivalrie (being then Duke of Cornwall and Earle of Chester), Prince of Wales by solemne investure, with a cap of estate and Coronet set on his head, a gold ring put upon his finger, and a silver vierge delivered into his hand, with the assent of Parliament.

— William Camden, Britannia (1607)

=== Brothers ===
In 1504, Henry Tudor (the future Henry VIII) was given the title after the death of his older brother Arthur (in 1502), who predeceased his father, King Henry VII.

The same occurred in 1616, when Henry Frederick Stuart predeceased (in 1612) his father James I; Henry's brother Charles Stuart, later Charles I, was given the title.

=== 1911 investiture of Prince Edward ===
Edward (then the heir apparent; later King Edward VIII) was invested as Prince of Wales at Caernarfon Castle in July 1911. This was the first such public investiture for centuries. He had been created Prince of Wales in June 1910.

On arrival, Edward addressed the crowd briefly in Welsh: "Môr o gân yw Cymru i gyd" ("All Wales is a sea of song"). The king presented Edward with the insignia of his office. After the ceremony the royal party rejoined the royal yacht. It was said that the ceremonial was partly "invented tradition".

=== 1969 investiture of Prince Charles ===
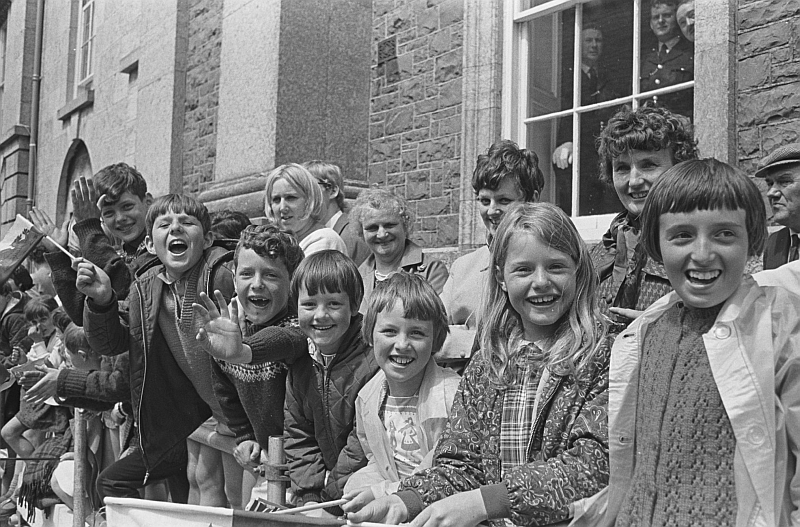
People at the investiture in 1969

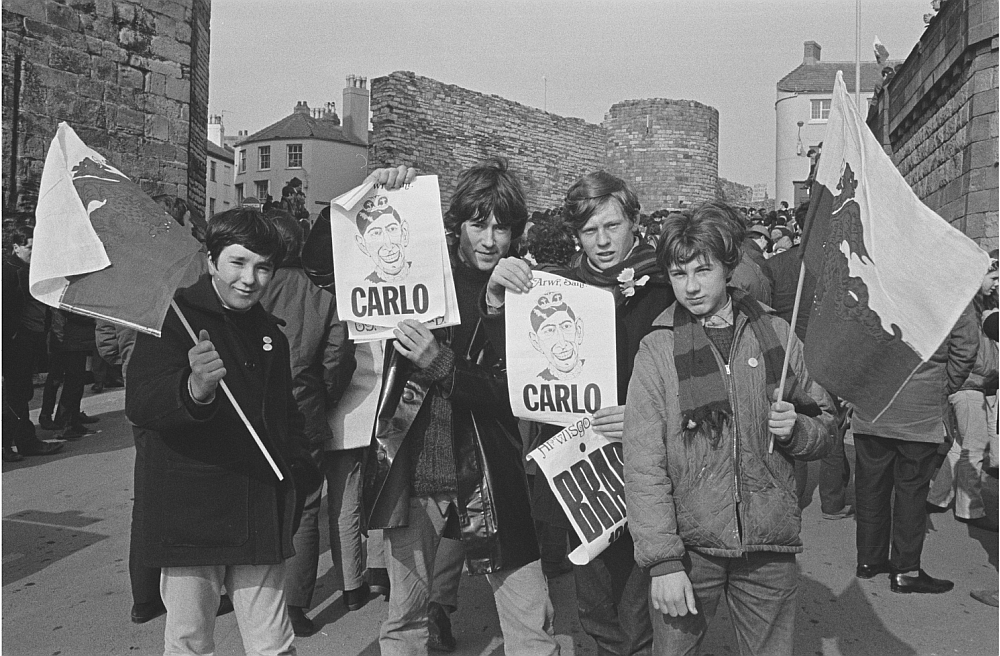
Two investiture protesters hold placards with "CARLO", and one protester holds a poster with the word "BRAD" ("Betrayal"), Caernarfon Castle 1969

Although the investiture of Charles as Prince of Wales in 1969 took place during a period of social change and a growing Welsh nationalist movement, it was largely welcomed by people in Wales. The investiture was also attended, by invitation, by 3,500 people who lived and worked in Wales. In the UK, the press focused on the pomp and regalia, with newspaper headlines such as "Welsh go wild for Their Royal Prince" and "Proud Wales takes Prince to her heart." It was also supported by the Secretary of State for Wales at the time, George Thomas, although he remained a controversial figure in Wales. Thomas later said to Prime Minister Harold Wilson that Charles's speech had "boosted Welsh nationalism."

The 1960s movement surrounding the investiture has historically been described as the "anti-investiture movement" and "anti-investiture sentiment". The investiture occurred during a period of revival of the Welsh national consciousness, with an outspoken section considering him as an English Prince being imposed upon Wales. The investiture also led to significant protests in Wales. The group "Cofia 1282" ("Remember 1282") also held protests against the investiture. On the day before the investiture there was a bombing by two members of Mudiad Amddiffyn Cymru (movement for the defence of Wales) in Abergele on a government building, however it detonated early, killing the two men.

=== William as Prince of Wales ===
On 9 September 2022 (the day after his accession to the throne), during his first address as king, Charles III said of his son William, "Today I am proud to create him Prince of Wales, Tywysog Cymru. The country whose title I've been so greatly privileged to bear during so much of my life of duty." Buckingham Palace stated that "The Prince and Princess [of Wales] look forward to celebrating Wales's proud history and traditions as well as a future that is full of promise". The First Minister of Wales, Mark Drakeford, noted that "William will be absolutely aware of the sensitivities that surround the title..."

Though the title started to be used immediately afterward, it was only documented formally by letters patent on 13 February 2023.

== Contemporary debate ==
=== Title ===
Following William being proclaimed Prince of Wales on 9 September 2022, Mark Drakeford, First Minister of Wales, expressed his surprise, saying he had not been given notice. The creation of a new Prince of Wales was the catalyst for a renewed debate on the title, and already, on 8 September, a petition had been started calling for the title to be ended. The petition had garnered 25,000 signatures in its first few days.

Former Welsh Assembly presiding officer Lord Elis-Thomas had also questioned the need for the title to continue, and recalled previous discussion with the then Prince Charles, who expressed his desire never again to have an investiture in Caernarfon Castle. According to Elis-Thomas, Charles laughed and said, "Do you think I want to put William through what I went through?"

The decision to grant William the title of Prince of Wales was criticised by the Welsh nationalist party Plaid Cymru. Senedd member Cefin Campbell called the decision "divisive" and party leader Adam Price called for a public debate on the issue.

The question raised by critics was one of respect for Wales as a country in its own right, and the continued symbol of the historical invasion and oppression of Wales. William pledged that he would serve Wales with humility and great respect for its people, and spoke of the honour he felt to do so. He signalled a desire to reform the role.

The contemporary debate does not focus wholly on abolition, but explores how, if the title is to continue, it may be adapted to reflect the realities of the changing constitutional relationship with Wales. This includes the question of whether the Welsh Government should play a greater role in the appointment process, or whether there should be a Senedd ceremonial process to reflect the nation's governance over its own affairs.

=== Opinion polls ===
A BBC Wales poll in 1999 showed that 73% of Welsh speakers believed the title should continue after Charles. A BBC poll in 2009, 40 years following the investiture, revealed 58% of Welsh people support the title "Prince of Wales"; 26% opposed the title. However, only 16% responded that Wales had benefited from having a prince.

In July 2018, an ITV poll found that 57% of Welsh people supported the title passing to William, with 22% for abolition or vacating the title. Support for another investiture was lower, with 31% supporting a ceremony similar to the 1969 one, 18% supporting a ceremony different to 1969, and 27% opposing an investiture.

In 2019, a BBC Wales poll showed that 50% supported the continuation of the title and 22% opposed. On the investiture, 41% supported a similar ceremony to 1969, 20% a different-style investiture ceremony, and 30% opposed any future investiture. A 2021 poll by Beaufort Research for Western Mail showed 61% of respondents in Wales supported another investiture, including 60% of Welsh-speakers polled.

In June 2022, an ITV/YouGov poll showed that 46% of adults in Wales wanted the Prince of Wales title to continue, and 31% said it should be abolished. In September 2022, a YouGov poll showed 66% support for Prince William to be given the title compared to 22% opposed, with 19% supporting a 1969-style investiture, 30% a different style of investiture and 34% opposing any investiture of Prince William as Prince of Wales.

== List of princes of Wales (English or British heirs apparent) ==
Person	Name	Heir of	Birth	Became heir apparent	Created Prince of Wales	Ceased to be Prince of Wales	Death
	Edward of Caernarfon	Edward I	25 April 1284	19 August 1284	7 February 1301	7 July 1307 acceded to throne as Edward II	21 September 1327
	Edward of Woodstock (The Black Prince)	Edward III	15 June 1330		12 May 1343	8 June 1376 deceased	
	Richard of Bordeaux	Edward III	6 January 1367	8 June 1376	20 November 1376	22 June 1377 acceded to throne as Richard II	14 February 1400
	Henry of Monmouth	Henry IV	16 September 1386	30 September 1399	15 October 1399	21 March 1413 acceded to throne as Henry V	31 August 1422
	Edward of Westminster (Edward of Lancaster)	Henry VI	13 October 1453		15 March 1454	4 May 1471 deceased	
	Edward of York	Edward IV	4 November 1470	11 April 1471	26 June 1471	9 April 1483 acceded to throne as Edward V	1483
	Edward of Middleham	Richard III	1473	26 June 1483	24 August 1483	31 March or 9 April 1484 deceased	
	Arthur	Henry VII	20 September 1486		29 November 1489	2 April 1502 deceased	
	Henry	Henry VII	28 June 1491	2 April 1502	18 February 1504	21 April 1509 acceded to throne as Henry VIII	28 January 1547
	Edward	Henry VIII	12 October 1537		c. 18 October 1537	28 January 1547 acceded to throne as Edward VI	6 July 1553
	Henry Frederick	James I	19 February 1594	24 March 1603	4 June 1610	6 November 1612 deceased	
	Charles	James I	19 November 1600	6 November 1612	4 November 1616	27 March 1625 acceded to throne as Charles I	30 January 1649
	Charles	Charles I	29 May 1630		c. 1638 – 1641	30 January 1649 title abolished; acceded to throne 1660 as Charles II	6 February 1685
	James Francis Edward Stuart (The Old Pretender, Chevalier de St. George)	James II	10 June 1688		c. 4 July 1688 never formally created	11 December 1688 father deposed	1 January 1766
	George Augustus	George I	10 November 1683	1 August 1714	27 September 1714	11 June 1727 acceded to throne as George II	25 October 1760
	Frederick	George II	1 February 1707	11 June 1727	7 January 1728	31 March 1751 deceased	
	George William Frederick	George II	4 June 1738	31 March 1751	20 April 1751	25 October 1760 acceded to throne as George III	29 January 1820
	George Augustus Frederick (The Prince Regent)	George III	12 August 1762		17 August 1762	29 January 1820 acceded to throne as George IV	26 June 1830
	Albert Edward	Victoria	9 November 1841		8 December 1841	22 January 1901 acceded to throne as Edward VII	6 May 1910
	George	Edward VII	3 June 1865	22 January 1901	9 November 1901	6 May 1910 acceded to throne as George V	20 January 1936
	Edward	George V	23 June 1894	6 May 1910	23 June 1910; Investiture: 13 July 1911	20 January 1936 acceded to throne as Edward VIII; abdicated 1936	28 May 1972
	Charles	Elizabeth II	14 November 1948	6 February 1952	26 July 1958; Investiture: 1 July 1969	8 September 2022 acceded to throne as Charles III	living
	William	Charles III	21 June 1982	8 September 2022	9 September 2022	Incumbent	living

The current sovereign Charles III was the longest serving Prince of Wales for 64 years and 44 days between 1958 and 2022, and the oldest person to hold the position. He was also heir apparent for longer than any other in British history. Upon the death of his mother on 8 September 2022, Charles became king and the title merged with the Crown. The following day, King Charles III bestowed the title upon his elder son, Prince William, Duke of Cornwall and Cambridge. Prince William is the oldest person to be created Prince of Wales.

== Family tree ==
Family tree of the Princes of Wales, Dukes of Cornwall, Dukes of Rothesay, Earls of Carrick and Earls of Chester

Earl of Chester (1st creation), 1067–1070
Gerbod the Fleming (?); Earl of Chester	Richard Goz (d. after 1082)	King William I (c. 1028–1087)
Earldom of Chester (1st creation) forfeit, 1071
Earl of Chester (2nd creation), 1071
Maud (Margaret)	Hugh d'Avranches (c. 1047–1101); 1st Earl of Chester	Adela of Normandy (c. 1067–1137)	Stephen, Count of Blois (c. 1045–1102)	King Henry I (c. 1068–1135)
Ranulf le Meschin (1070–1129); 3rd Earl of Chester	Richard d'Avranches (1094–1120); 2nd Earl of Chester	Lucia-Mahaut (d. 1120)	Robert Rufus (c. 1090–1147); Earl of Gloucester
Ranulf de Gernon (1099–1153); 4th Earl of Chester	Maud (Matilda) of Gloucester (d. 1189)
Hugh of Cyfeiliog (1147–1181); 5th Earl of Chester
Ranulf de Blondeville (1170–1232); 6th Earl of Chester, Earl of Lincoln	Matilda (Maud) (1171–1233); Countess of Chester suo jure
Earl of Chester (4th creation), 1264
John of Scotland (c. 1207–1237); 7th Earl of Chester, Earl of Huntingdon	Simon de Montfort (1208–1265); Earl of Chester, Earl of Leicester
Earldom of Chester (2nd creation) reverted to the crown, 1237	Earl of Chester (3rd creation), 1254	Earldom of Chester (4th creation) forfeit, 1265
Edward, Lord of Chester (1239–1307); Earl of Chester (without the title of Earl), later King Edward I
Earldom of Chester (3rd creation) reverted to the crown, 1272
Earl of Chester (5th creation), 1301
Edward of Caernarfon (1284–1327); Prince of Wales and Earl of Chester; 1301–1307, later King Edward II
Earldom of Chester (5th creation) reverted to the crown, 1307
Earl of Chester (6th creation), 1312
Robert Stewart (1316–1390); Earl of Carrick (1316–1368), later King Robert II of Scots	Edward Plantagenet (1312–1377); Earl of Chester (1312–1327), later King Edward III
Hereafter, the Earldom of Chester was created in conjunction with the Principality of Wales.
Duke of Cornwall, 1337
John Stewart (1337–1406); Earl of Carrick (1368–1390), later King Robert III of Scots	Edward the Black Prince (1330–1376); Duke of Cornwall (1337–1376), Prince of Wales (1343–1376)	John of Gaunt (1340–1399); Duke of Lancaster	Lionel of Antwerp (1338–1368); Duke of Clarence	Edmund of Langley (1341–1402); Duke of York
Dukedom of Cornwall extinct, 1376
Duke of Cornwall, 1376
Richard of Bordeaux (1367–1400); Prince of Wales (1376–1377), Duke of Cornwall (1376–1377), later King Richard II	John Beaufort (c. 1371–1410)	King Henry IV (1366–1413)	Philippa of Clarence (1355–1382)
Dukedom of Cornwall merged in the Crown, 1377
Roger Mortimer (1374–1398)
Duke of Rothesay created, 1398	Duke of Cornwall restored, 1399
David Stewart (1378–1402); Earl of Carrick (1390–1402); Duke of Rothesay (1398–1402)	Henry of Monmouth (1386–1422); Prince of Wales (1399–1413), Duke of Cornwall (1399–1413), later King Henry V	Anne de Mortimer (1390–1411)	Richard of Conisburgh (c. 1375–1415); Earl of Cambridge
Duke of Cornwall, 1460
James (1394–1437); Earl of Carrick (1402–1406); Duke of Rothesay (1404–1406), later King James I of Scots	Joan Beaufort (c. 1404–1445)	John Beaufort (1404–1444); Duke of Somerset	Henry (1421–1471); Duke of Cornwall (1421–1422), later King Henry VI	Richard Plantagenet (1411–1460); Duke of York; Prince of Wales (1460), Duke of Cornwall (1460)
Alexander Stewart (1430); Duke of Rothesay (1430)	James (1430–1460); Duke of Rothesay (1431–1437), later King James II of Scots	Margaret Beaufort (1443–1509)	King Edward IV (1442–1483)	King Richard III (1452–1485)
James (1451–1488); Duke of Rothesay (1452–1460), later King James III of Scots	King Henry VII (1457–1509)	Edward of Westminster (1453–1471); Prince of Wales (1454–1471), Duke of Cornwall (1454–1471)
From the 1469 Act of Scottish Parliament, the Earldom of Carrick and the Dukedom of Rothesay was to be automatically held by the "first-born Prince of the King of Scots."
James (1473–1513); Duke of Rothesay (1473–1488), later King James IV of Scots	Margaret Tudor (1489–1541)	Arthur Tudor (1486–1502); Prince of Wales (1489–1502), Duke of Cornwall (1486–1502)	Henry Tudor (1491–1547); Prince of Wales (1504–1509), Duke of Cornwall (1502–1509), later King Henry VIII	Edward (1470–1483); Prince of Wales (1471–1483), Duke of Cornwall (1471–1483), later King Edward V	Edward of Middleham (c. 1473–1484); Prince of Wales (1483–1484), Duke of Cornwall (1483–1484)
James Stewart (1507–1508); Duke of Rothesay (1507–1508)	Arthur Stewart (1509–1510); Duke of Rothesay (1509–1510)	James (1512–1542); Duke of Rothesay (1512–1513), later King James V of Scots	Henry (1511); Duke of Cornwall (1511)	Edward Tudor (1537–1553); Prince of Wales (1537–1547), Duke of Cornwall (1537–1547), later King Edward VI
James Stewart (1540–1541); Duke of Rothesay (1540–1541)	Mary, Queen of Scots (1542–1587)
James Charles Stuart (1566–1625); Duke of Rothesay (1566–1567), later King James VI/I
Henry Frederick Stuart (1594–1612); Prince of Wales (1610–1612), Duke of Cornwall (1603–1612), Duke of Rothesay (1594–1612)	Elizabeth Stuart (1596–1662)	Charles Stuart (1600–1649); Prince of Wales (1616–1625), Duke of Cornwall (1612–1625), Duke of Rothesay (1612–1625), later King Charles I
Sophia of Hanover (1630–1714)	Charles James (1629); Duke of Cornwall (1629), Duke of Rothesay (1629), styled Prince of Wales	Charles Stuart (1630–1685); Prince of Wales (c. 1638/1641–1649), Duke of Cornwall (1630–1649), Duke of Rothesay (1630–1649), later King Charles II	King James II/VII (1633–1701)
King George I (1660–1727)
George Augustus (1683–1760); Prince of Wales (1714–1727), Duke of Cornwall (1714–1727), Duke of Rothesay (1714–1727), later King George II	James Francis Edward Stuart (1688–1766); Prince of Wales (c. 1688–1688), Duke of Cornwall (1688–1702), Duke of Rothesay (1688–1702)
Frederick Louis (1707–1751); Prince of Wales (1729–1751), Duke of Cornwall (1727–1751), Duke of Rothesay (1727–1751)
George William Frederick (1738–1820); Prince of Wales (1751–1760), later King George III
George Augustus Frederick (1762–1830); Prince of Wales (1762–1820), Duke of Cornwall (1762–1820), Duke of Rothesay (1762–1820), later King George IV	Edward Augustus (1767–1820); Duke of Kent and Strathearn
Queen Victoria (1819–1901)
Albert Edward (1841–1910); Prince of Wales (1841–1901), Duke of Cornwall (1841–1901), Duke of Rothesay (1841–1901), later King Edward VII
George Frederick Ernest Albert (1865–1936); Prince of Wales (1901–1910), Duke of Cornwall (1901–1910), Duke of Rothesay (1901–1910), later King George V
Edward Albert Christian George Andrew Patrick David (1894–1972); Prince of Wales (1910–1936), Duke of Cornwall (1910–1936), Duke of Rothesay (1910–1936), later King Edward VIII, later Duke of Windsor	King George VI (1895–1952)
Queen Elizabeth II (1926–2022)
Charles Philip Arthur George (b. 1948); Prince of Wales (1958–2022), Duke of Cornwall (1952–2022), Duke of Rothesay (1952–2022), later King Charles III
William Arthur Philip Louis (b. 1982); Prince of Wales (since 2022), Duke of Cornwall (since 2022), Duke of Rothesay (since 2022), Duke of Cambridge
Prince George of Wales (b. 2013)

== See also ==
- List of heirs to the British throne
- List of heirs to the English throne
- Prince's Consent
- Princess of Wales
- Prince of Wales's feathers
- Wales in the Late Middle Ages
- Welsh heraldry

== Bibliography ==
- Boutell, Charles (1863). A Manual of Heraldry, Historical and Popular. London: Windsor And Newton. ISBN 978-1-146-28954-2.
- Pinches, John Harvey; Pinches, Rosemary (1974). The Royal Heraldry of England. Heraldry Today. Slough, Buckinghamshire: Hollen Street Press. ISBN 978-0-900455-25-4.
