= Repton Priory =

Dissolved Derbyshire priory

- Location within Derbyshire

Monastery information
- Other names: Prior and Canonry of Holy Trinity of Repton and the Canonry of St. Giles of Calke
- Established: 12th-Century
- Disestablished: 1538
- Mother house: Calke Priory
- Diocese: Diocese of Lichfield
- Controlled churches: St. Wystan's Church, Repton; Croxall; Willington; Baddow, Essex

People
- Founder: Maud of Gloucester, Countess of Chester

Site
- Location: Repton, Derbyshire, England, United Kingdom.
- Coordinates: 52°50′29″N 1°33′01″W
- Visible remains: Only small fragments remain: mainly footings and foundations

Repton Priory was a priory in Repton, Derbyshire, England. It was established in the 12th century and was originally under the control of Calke Priory. It was dissolved in 1538.

The priory became a place of pilgrimage on account of the shrine of St Guthlac, and his bell. Pilgrims believed that placing their head upon it would cure headaches.

== History ==
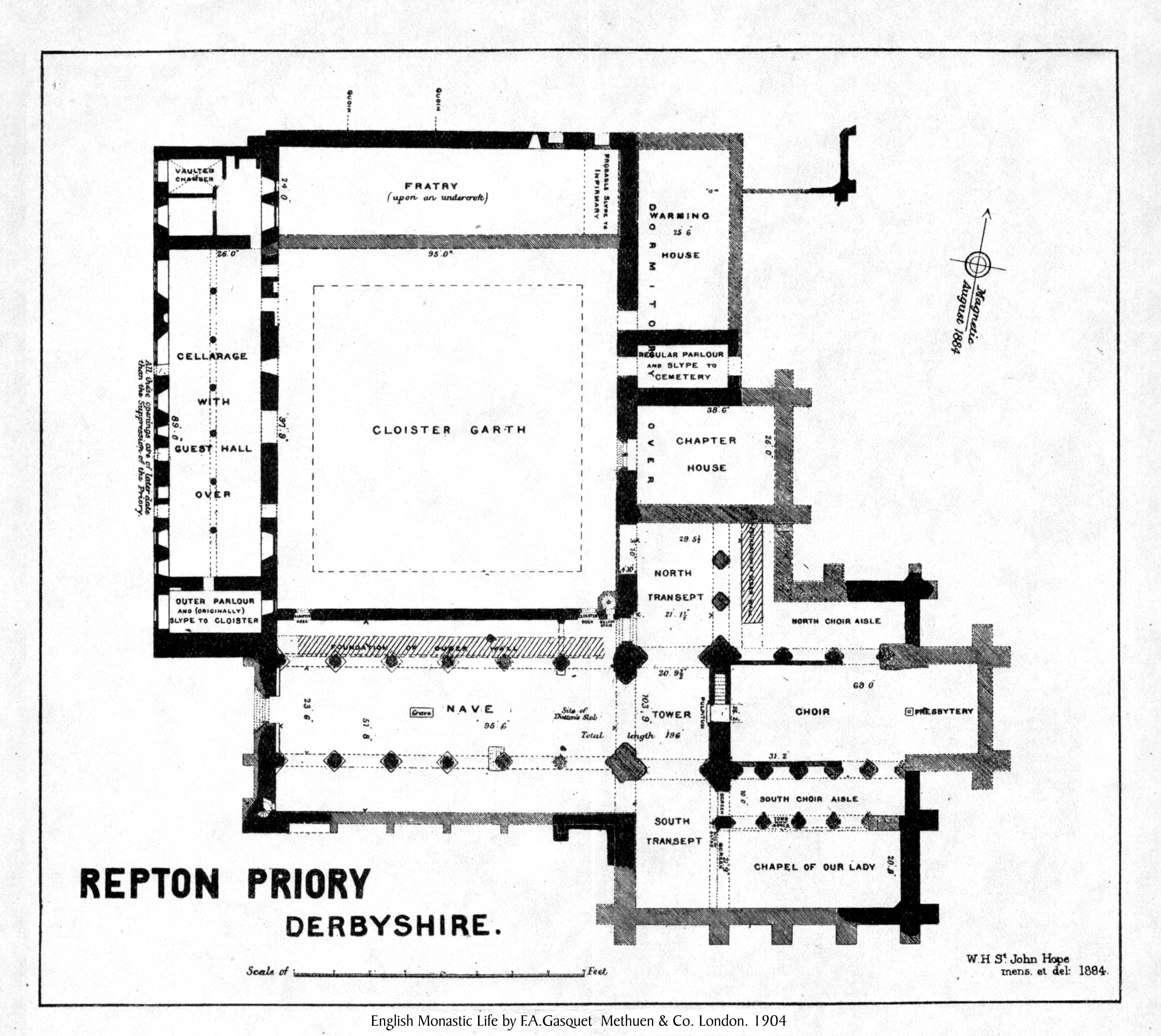
A plan of the priory church and attached buildings

In the 12th century Maud of Gloucester, Countess of Chester held the manor of Repton. When her husband Ranulf de Gernon, 4th Earl of Chester died in 1153 she granted St Wystan's Church to the Augustinian canons at Calke Priory. Maud then had a new Priory built at Repton, dedicated to the Holy Trinity. Repton Priory was originally a cell to Calke Priory; however, Countess Maud's donation was made on the condition that most of the canons should transfer to the new Repton Priory as soon as convenient. This happened in 1172, with the two priories' roles thus reversed and Calke becoming a cell to Repton. The canons did not abandon Calke entirely though, and the priory is for the next few centuries referred to as a joint priory of both Repton and Calke. Contemporary charters refer to the: "Prior and Canonry of Holy Trinity of Repton and the Canonry of St. Giles of Calke".

The medieval priory buildings included the priory church, a cloister flanked by a chapter house, refectory, prior's lodgings, a hall and cellars, plus ancillary buildings a short distance away.

In 1220 Nicholas de Willington granted the advowson of the church at Willington to the priory on the condition that the canons of the priory would pray for him and his heirs.

In January 1263 Pope Urban IV ordered the priory to pay his papal subdeacon and chaplain, John De Ebulo, a very large pension of forty silver marks a year. It is unclear why the pope ordered the priory to pay this expense.

The priory was granted a charter of confirmation by Roger de Meyland, Bishop of Coventry and Lichfield in 1271 and a second by King Henry III in 1272. These charters confirmed the Priory's control of St Wystan's Church (which the priory had left without a vicar) and St. Wystan's eight chapelries at Bretby, Foremark, Ingleby, Measham, Milton, Newton, Smisby and Ticknall. The charters also confirmed Repton Priory's control of the churches of Croxall and Willington in Derbyshire and Baddow in Essex.

The Taxation Roll of 1291 reveals the priory received an annual income of £38 0s. 3½d. from their secular properties, and £28 from their control of St Wystan's Church. As they held land with an income of over £20, in 1297 the prior was summoned to a muster at Nottingham to perform military service.

The priory had originally remained under the patronage of the founding family: the descendants of Maud of Gloucester, Countess of Chester. However, the election of a new prior in 1336 revealed the priory's advowson had passed to the King. The advowson had originally passed through the Chester family to Ranulf de Blondeville, 6th Earl of Chester. Upon his death his property was shared between his four sisters; Matilda of Chester, Countess of Huntingdon receiving the advowson of the priory which passed through her descendants to John Balliol, former King of Scotland. The control of the Priory passed to King Edward I upon the forfeiture of all of John Balliol's land.

The 1535 Valor Ecclesiasticus records the priory as having an annual income of £118 8s., after expenses. Repton thus failed to escape the first wave of King Henry VIII's dissolutions, and was dissolved in 1536, along with the other small monasteries (those with incomes of £200 or less). Repton was, however, among a minority of priories which were reinstated after the payment of a bribe or fine. The year after it was first dissolved, on 12 June 1537, John Young was reappointed as prior having paid the King a "very heavy fine" of £266 13s. 4d. The fine only saved the priory for another year, however, as on 25 October 1538 the priory was surrendered to the crown for dissolution for a second (and final) time.

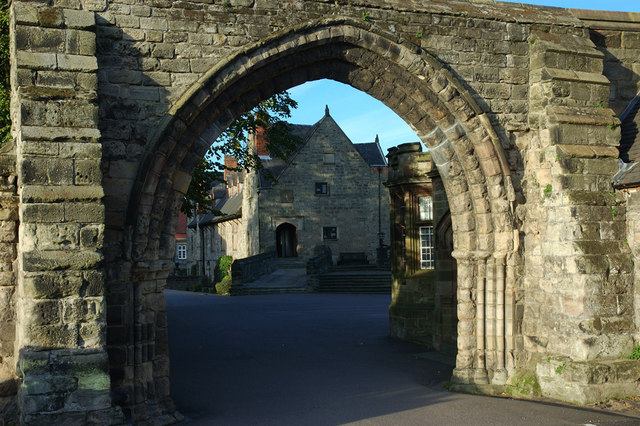
An arch from the former Repton Priory: one of the few remaining fragments. It was moved to its current position in 1906.

The prior, John Young, died three days before the formal surrender was signed. The sub-prior was allotted a pension of £6 annually; four of the canons were awarded £5 6. 8d. annually; three canons were awarded £5 annually; and a further two canons were awarded £4 annually.

Following dissolution the priory was awarded to Thomas Thacker, who retained the priory buildings. After his death in 1548 it passed to his son Gilbert Thacker. Following the accession of Catholic Queen Mary I, Gilbert was concerned that the priory might be put back into religious use, and so ordered that it be completely destroyed, a task that was almost entirely completed within a single day. Gilbert Thacker claimed "He would destroy the nest, for fear the birds should build therein again."

On 6 June 1557 Sir John Port of Etwall died without a male heir and his bequests included funds to provide almshouses at Etwall but also the means to found a "Grammar School in Etwalle or Reptone", where the scholars every day were to pray for the souls of his parents and other relatives. In 1559 the executors of the will purchased from the Thacker family, for £37 10s, the former priory site, which was developed into Repton School.

== Remains ==
Of the original priory building only fragments survive. Fragments of the foundations of the prior's lodgings, dated c.1438, were incorporated into a later building at Repton School; the majority of this building dates from the 17th century, however, and was comprehensively altered in the 19th century. Parts of the foundations of other areas of the priory remain in several areas, having been uncovered during construction work at Repton School in 1922: the bases of a cluster of columns remain of the former chancel and chapels; fragments of an arch remain, belonging to the former pulpitum, which were moved to their current position in 1906; and fragments of the door surrounds of both the chapter house and warming room also survive.

== Priors ==
Priors of Repton:

- Robert, c.1153–c.1160
- Nicholas, c.1172–c.1181
- Albred, c.1200
- Richard, c.1208
- Nicholas, c. 1215
- John, c.1220
- Reginald, c. 1230
- Peter, c.1252
- Robert, c.1289
- Ralph, 1316–36
- John de Lichfield, 1336–46
- Simon de Sutton, 1346–56
- Ralph of Derby, 1356–99
- William of Tutbury, 1399–
- William Maynesin, c.1411
- Wystan Porter, ?–1436; resigned
- John Overton, 1436–38; died in office
- John Wylne, 1438–71
- Thomas Sutton, 1471–86
- Henry Prest, 1486–1503
- William Derby, 1503–08
- John Young, 1508–36, and 1537–38; died in office
