= Ranulf of Chester =

Ranulf of Chester can refer to:

- Ranulf le Meschin, 3rd Earl of Chester (d. c. 1129)
- Ranulf de Gernon, 4th Earl of Chester (d. c. 1153)
- Ranulf de Blondeville, 6th Earl of Chester (c. 1172–1232)
