= Margaret of Huntingdon, Lady of Galloway =

Scottish noblewoman (c. 1194 – c. 1230)

Margaret of Huntingdon
- Lady of Galloway
- Died: before 1228
- Spouse: Alan of Galloway
- Issue: Christiana of Galloway; Dervorguilla of Galloway; Thomas of Galloway
- House: Dunkeld
- Father: David of Scotland
- Mother: Matilda of Chester

Margaret of Huntingdon (died before 1228) was the eldest daughter of David, Earl of Huntingdon (died 1219) and his wife, Maud (died 1233), sister of Ranulf III, Earl of Chester (died 1232), and daughter of Hugh II, Earl of Chester (died 1181). Margaret was the second wife of Alan, Lord of Galloway (died 1234). She and Alan married in 1209, and had a family of a son and two daughters. The elder daughter, Christiana, married William de Forz (died 1260). The younger daughter, Dervorguilla (died 1290), married John de Balliol, Lord of Barnard Castle (died 1268). Margaret and Alan's son, Thomas—Alan's only legitimate son—may have lived into the 1220s, but died young.

Margaret had seven siblings, among them: Elizabeth of Huntingdon, wife of Robert of Brus, 4th Lord of Annandale, and therefore ancestor of King Robert I of Scotland; John of Scotland, Earl of Huntingdon, his father's successor, husband of Elen ferch Llywelyn, daughter of Llywelyn the Great, Prince of Gwynedd, with whom she had a daughter, etc.
