= David of Scotland =

David of Scotland may refer to:

- David I of Scotland (1084–1153), King of the Scots
- David II of Scotland, (1324–1371), son of Robert the Bruce
- David of Scotland, 8th Earl of Huntingdon, (1144–1219), Scottish prince, grandson of King David I
