= Matilda of Chester, Countess of Huntingdon =

Anglo-Norman noblewoman (1171–1233)

Matilda of Chester
- Countess of Huntingdon
- Born: 1171
- Died: 6 January 1233 (aged 61–62)
- Spouse: David of Scotland, Earl of Huntingdon
- Issue: John of Scotland, Earl of Huntingdon and 7th Earl of Chester; Henry of Huntingdon; Robert of Huntingdon; Margaret of Huntingdon; Isobel of Huntingdon; Ada of Huntingdon; Matilda of Huntingdon
- Father: Hugh of Cyfeiliog, 5th Earl of Chester
- Mother: Bertrade of Évreux

Matilda of Chester, Countess of Huntingdon (1171 – 6 January 1233) was an Anglo-Norman noblewoman, sometimes known as Maud and sometimes known with the surname de Kevelioc. She was a daughter of Hugh of Cyfeiliog, 5th Earl of Chester, and Bertrade of Évreux, and the wife of David of Scotland, Earl of Huntingdon.

== Family ==
Lady Maude was born in 1171, the eldest child of Hugh de Kevelioc (alias Hugh de Meschines), 5th Earl of Chester and Bertrade de Montfort, a cousin of King Henry II of England. Her paternal grandparents were Ranulf de Gernon and Maud (Matilda) of Gloucester, the granddaughter of King Henry I of England, and her maternal grandparents were Simon III de Montfort, Count of Évreux and Mahaut.

Lady Matilda's five siblings were:

- Ranulf de Blondeville, 6th Earl of Chester
- Richard (died young)
- Mabel of Chester, Countess of Arundel
- Agnes (Alice) of Chester, Countess of Derby
- Hawise of Chester, Countess of Lincoln.

She also had a sister, Amice (or Amicia) of Chester, who may have been illegitimate.

Matilda's father died in 1181 when she was ten years of age. He had served in King Henry's Irish campaigns after his estates had been restored to him in 1177. They had been confiscated by the King as a result of his taking part in the baronial Revolt of 1173–1174. His son Ranulf succeeded him as Earl of Chester, and Matilda became a co-heiress of her brother.

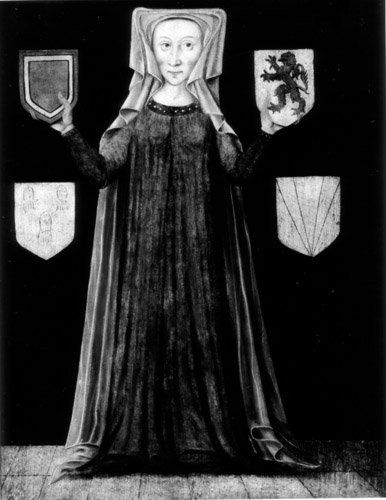
Dervorguilla of Galloway, a granddaughter of Matilda of Chester

== Marriage and issue ==
On 26 August 1190, she married David of Scotland, 8th Earl of Huntingdon, a Scottish prince, son of Henry of Scotland, 3rd Earl of Huntingdon, and a younger brother of Malcolm IV of Scotland and William I of Scotland. He was almost twenty years Matilda's senior. The marriage was recorded by Benedict of Peterborough.

David and Matilda had seven children:

- Margaret of Huntingdon (c. 1194 – after 1 June 1233), married Alan, Lord of Galloway, by whom she had two daughters, including Dervorguilla of Galloway.
- Robert of Huntingdon (died young)
- Ada of Huntingdon, married Sir Henry de Hastings, by whom she had one son, Henry de Hastings, 1st Baron Hastings.
- Matilda (Maud) of Huntingdon (-aft.1219, unmarried)
- Isobel of Huntingdon (1199–1251), married Robert Bruce, 4th Lord of Annandale, by whom she had two sons, including Robert de Brus, 5th Lord of Annandale.
- John of Scotland, Earl of Huntingdon (1207 – 6 June 1237), married Elen ferch Llywelyn. He succeeded his uncle Ranulf as Earl of Chester in 1232, but died childless.
- Henry of Huntingdon (died young)

Her husband David had four illegitimate children by various mistresses.

On her brother Ranulf's death in October 1232 Matilda inherited a share in his estates with her other three sisters, and his Earldom of Chester suo jure. Less than a month later with the consent of the King, Matilda gave an inter vivos gift of the Earldom to her son John the Scot who became Earl of Chester by right of his mother. He was formally invested by King Henry III as Earl of Chester on 21 November 1232. He became Earl of Chester in his own right on the death of his mother six weeks later.

Matilda died on 6 January 1233 at the age of about sixty-two. Her husband had died in 1219. In 1290, upon the death of Margaret, Maid of Norway, which caused the extinction of the legitimate line of William I, the descendants of David and Matilda became prime competitors for the crown of Scotland, including John Balliol, who was chosen king, and Robert de Brus, grandfather of king Robert I.

Peerage of England
Preceded by Ranulf de Blondeville	Countess of Chester suo jure 26 Oct - 21 Nov 1232	Succeeded by John the Scot
