= Magna Carta of Chester =

1215 English charter of rights

Magna Carta of Chester, or Cheshire, was a charter of rights issued in 1215 in the style of Magna Carta. The charter is primarily concerned with the relationship between the Earl of Chester and his barons, though the final clause states that the barons must allow similar concessions to their own tenants.

== Background ==
The location of the Earldom of Chester in relation to the Kingdom of England.

The Runnymede Charter of Liberties did not apply to the shire of Chester, which at the time was a separate feudal domain. At the petitions of his barons, the Earl of Chester, Ranulf III set out his own charter. The similarities between many of the clauses in the Magna Carta of Chester and those in Magna Carta indicates that it was written after King John issued the latter on 19 June 1215.

In the early 1200s, the Earldom of Chester was the only county palatine on the Welsh Marches; Ranulf III ruled Chester as a separate feudal domain. His barons living outside of Cheshire are referred to as his 'knights from England'. In the late 12th century manuscript De laude Cestrie, Lucian of Chester describes the county as obedient, 'more to the sword of its prince than to the crown of the king.'

Ranulf III had been loyal to the king during the First Barons' War and had supported Magna Carta. Ranulf III, William Marshal, the Earl of Derby and Earl of Warwick were the most powerful supporters of the king. In 1215, Ranulf was one of the few magnates to serve as a witness for Magna Carta.

Before John's death in 1216, rebel barons offered the throne of England to Prince Louis of France. Louis arrived in England unopposed in the summer of 1216 and took Winchester. Ranulf was an outspoken supporter for the re-issuing of Magna Carta after Louis' retreat in 1217. He also witnessed the 1225 re-issue of the Runnymead Magna Carta. His general support for John's Magna Carta, makes the issuing of his own no surprise.

== Content ==
The charter is recorded as having been issued, 'at the petition of the barons of Cheshire,' suggesting that they were sufficiently discontented that Ranulf III attempted to pacify them before taking the cross.

The charter has 13 clauses, in contrast to the 60 of Magna Carta.

=== Clauses 1 & 4 ===
Several clauses approach issues found in the Runnymede charter, but in a different way. Clauses 1 and 4 deal with the rival claims of the earl's court and barons' courts to jurisdiction over tenants living on baronial estates. Clause 1 acknowledges the earl's right to judge the most serious offences, but Clause 4 allows defendants of his court to plea thwertnic ('I deny it all'), on which the defendant would be released to the jurisdiction of their baron.

=== Clauses 2 & 3 ===
Clauses 2 and 3 refer to the system whereby fugitive villeins from outside the county, including those fleeing justice, could take refuge on the estates of the earl or his barons. This was accompanied by an obligation on the part of male fugitives to provide labour and military service.

=== Clauses 5 & 6 ===
Clause 5 limits penalties that the earl's court could apply, but Graeme White argues that this applied only to the specific of non-attendance by judges and suitors; a far more restricted context than that specified in Magna Carta clauses 20 and 21. Clause Six grants various rights within the Cheshire forests: to assart, cultivate land and sell dead wood. Clause 8 protects widows and heirs, but makes no specific mention of wardship.

=== Clause 9 ===
Clause 9 raises the issue whereby urban residence for a year and day would secure an individual freedom from villeinage. Migration from the countryside into Chester - prospering as a port in the wake of Henry II's acquisitions in Ireland - was of concern to the Cheshire barons, who wanted their entitlements to reclaim their villeins spelled out.

=== Clause 10 ===
Clause 10 concerns limits to military service and castle-guard duty, similar to Magna Carta clauses 16 and 29. However, Clause 10 goes into a level of detail befitting a frontier county accustomed to threatened or actual attack from the Welsh. Significant points here include the treatment of the Lyme as a border beyond which Cheshire knights are not obliged to fight and the expectation that the garrisoning of Chester castle should fall primarily upon fees of the honour outside the county.

=== Clause 11 ===
Clause 11 limits the provisions that could be claimed by officials. This clause resembles Magna Carta Clause 28, although the Cheshire charter focusses specifically upon the entitlements of itinerant law-enforcement officers.

=== Clause 12 ===
Clause 12 of the charter has no counterpart in Magna Carta. Ranulf III was quite happy to itemise the petitions he had turned down, most of which were related to the aspirations of particular individuals or interest-groups, rather than the baronial community as a whole.

Clause 12

And may it be known that the aforesaid barons have completely remitted to me and my heirs, on behalf of themselves and their heirs, the following petitions which they were asking from me, so that they can claim nothing in relation to them henceforth, unless by my grace and mercy: namely, the steward his petition for wreck and fish washed up on his land by the sea, and for shooting in my forest with three bows, and for hunting with his dogs; and others the petition for the agistment of pigs in my forest and for shooting with three bows in my forest, or for the coursing of their hares in the forest on the way to, or returning from Chester in response to a summons; and the petition for the amercement of the judges of Wich thirty boilings of salt, but the amercement and laws in Wich shall be as they were before.

Original Latin text

Clause 12
Et sciendum est quod predicti barones peticiones subscriptas, quas a me requirebant, omnino mihi et heredibus meis de se et heredibus suis remiserunt, ita quod nihil in eis de cetero clamare poterunt, nisi per gratiam et misericordiam meam; scilicet, senescallus peticionem de wrec et de pisce in terram suam per mare deiecto, et de bersare in foresta mea ad tres arcus, et de percursu canum suorum; et alii peticionem de agistiamento porcorum in foresta mea et de bersare ad tres arcus in foresta mea, vel ad cursus leporariorum suorum in foresta in eundo versus Cestriam per summonitionem vel in redeundo; et petitionem de misericordia iudicum de Wich triginta bullonum salis, set erunt misericordia et leges in Wich tales quales prius fuerunt.

The steward mentioned was Roger de Montalt, who held land on the south-west side of the Dee estuary; he was well-placed to profit from accidents to ships using the port of Chester. The reference to, 'the coursing of their hares in the forest on the way to, or returning from Chester in response to a summons,' suggests that the barons were hoping that sport would be laid on whenever they were summoned to Chester.

== Comparison with Magna Carta ==
Many phrases in the Cheshire charter are similar to those in Magna Carta and appear to have been adapted directly from it. Clause 1 in the Cheshire charter refers to 'pleas of the sword' (exceptis placitis ad gladium meum pertinentibus), similar to Clause One of Magna Carta's 'pleas of the Crown.' Similarly, Clauses 1 and 4 conclude with references to a private prosecutor and witnesses respectively, paralleling the provisions made in Magna Carta Clause 38 to prevent unsupported allegations by local officials.

Clause 6 grants the Cheshire barons rights within the Cheshire forests to: assart; cultivate land; and sell dead wood. In contrast to the 'forest clauses' of Magna Carta (44, 47 and 48), there is no mention of disafforestation or curbing officials.

Clause 8 protects widows and heirs, but makes no specific mention of wardship. The clause is so brief that it suggests the outrage fuelling Magna Carta Clauses 2 - 8 were of less concern to the barons of Cheshire.

Clause 13 contains the strongest link to Magna Carta, with its insistence that, ‘all common knights and free tenants of the whole of Cheshire,’ should enjoy the same treatment from the barons, as the barons would have from the earl. This parallels Magna Carta's Clause 60, which extends its concessions to ‘all men of our realm’.

== Reissue ==
When Magna Carta was reconfirmed in 1300 by Edward I, the Earldom of Chester had already belonged to the king for 63 years, thus Magna Carta applied to Cheshire. However, the Cheshire charter was also confirmed on 30 March 1300. The charter had previously been reissued on 27 August 1265, after the Battle of Evesham to reward the county for its support.
