= Henry de Hastings (died 1268) =

Arms of Henry de Hastings: Or, a maunch gules, from the Collins Roll, also appears in Glover's Roll, B150; The Camden Roll, D139 & Charles' Roll, F77

Henry de Hastings (c. 1235 – c. 1268) of Ashill, Norfolk, was a supporter of Simon de Montfort in his rebellion against King Henry III. He led the Londoners at the Battle of Lewes in 1264, where he was taken prisoner, and fought at the Battle of Evesham in 1265, where de Montfort was killed. He resisted King Henry III's extensive siege of Kenilworth and after the Dictum of Kenilworth he commanded the last remnants of the baronial party when they made their last stand in the Isle of Ely, but submitted to the king in July 1267. In 1264 he was created a supposed baron by de Montfort, which title had no legal validity following the suppression of the revolt.

== Origins ==
He was the only son of Sir Henry de Hastings (died 1250) by his wife Ada of Huntingdon, the youngest of the four daughters of David of Scotland, 8th Earl of Huntingdon and Maud of Chester.

== Marriage and children ==
His father died in 1250 when he was a minor and in about 1252 his wardship and marriage were purchased by William III de Cantilupe (d.1254), 3rd feudal baron of Eaton Bray in Bedfordshire, who married him off to the elder of his two daughters, Joan de Cantilupe (d.1271). Joan's mother was Eva de Braose, heiress of the Lordship of Abergavenny in Wales. Her brother Sir George de Cantilupe (1251-1273), Lord of Abergavenny, died aged 22, when Joanna and her sister Millicent became the co-heiresses to his vast estates. By his wife he had issue including:

- John Hastings, 1st Baron Hastings (1262-1313), Lord of Abergavenny, eldest son, summoned to Parliament as Lord Hastings in 1290.

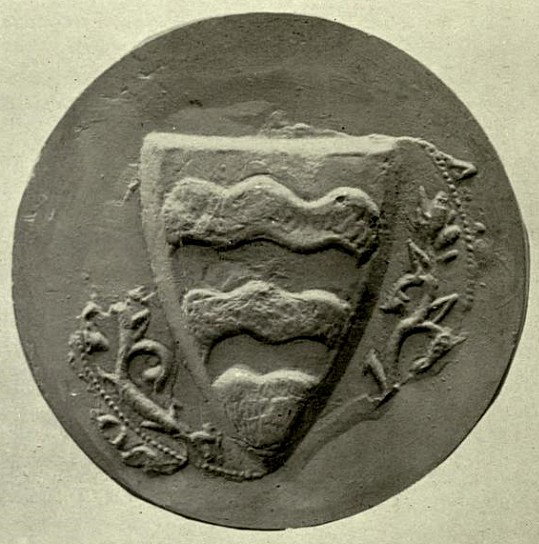
Seal of Edmund Hastings, 1st Baron Hastings, affixed to the Barons' Letter of 1301, which his brother also sealed. He displays the arms of Muireadhach I, Earl of Menteith (d. 1213): Barry wavy of six argent and azure (possibly or and gules)

- Edmund Hastings, 1st Baron Hastings (post 1262-circa 1314) "of Inchmahome" (anciently Inchmacholmok), Perthshire, Scotland. On 29 December 1299 he was summoned to Parliament as "Lord Hastings". Shortly after 1292 he married Isabella Comyn, widow of William Comyn of Badenoch and daughter of Walter Comyn, Earl of Menteith in right of his wife. He was at the Siege of Caerlaverock Castle in June 1300, together with his brother, when their armorials were blazoned in verse in the Roll of Caerlaverock. He signed and sealed the Barons' Letter of 1301 to the pope, in which he is called Dominus de Enchemehelmock ("Lord of Inchmacholmok", the chief castle of the Earldom of Menteith) with his seal bearing the legend S(igillum): Edmundi: De: Hasting: De: Comitatu: Menetei ("seal of Edmund Hastings Earl of Menteith"). He died childless when the title became extinct.
- Lora de Hastings, married Thomas Latimer, 1st Baron Latimer, had issue.

== Death and burial ==
He and his wife (and son John and daughter-in-law Isabel de Valence) were buried in the Hastings Chapel of the Greyfriars Monastery in Coventry, Warwickshire (founded circa 1234), where were placed their effigies (now lost). Joan's heart however was buried in Abergavenny Priory, where survives her effigy holding "in the palm of its hand" a heart. According to Dugdale (1666) quoting from an inscription in ancient French, the stained glass windows of this chapel displayed coats of arms including: Hastings, Cumyn (wife of son Edmund), Cantilupe, Valence (first wife of son John), de Spenser (second wife of son John) and Huntingfeld.
