= Henry de Hastings (died 1250) =

13th century English noble

Henry Hastings (died 1250), was an English soldier and noble.

He was the eldest son of William de Hastings and Margaret Bigod. Henry fought during the Saintonge War in Poitou in 1242 and was taken prisoner at Saintes. He was summoned to serve in Scotland in 1244. In 1250, he took the cross, but died in July 1250. Henry was buried at St Mary's Church, Astbury in Cheshire.

== Marriage and issue ==
Henry married Ada of Huntingdon, daughter of David, Earl of Huntingdon and Maud of Chester, they are known to have had the following known issue:

- Henry de Hastings (died 1268), married Joan de Cantilupe.
- Ada de Hastings, married to Hubert Hovel.
- Margery de Hastings
- Hilary de Hastings, married firstly William de Harcourt, and secondly Robert de Frankeville.
