= John of Scotland, Earl of Huntingdon =

English Earl (c. 1207–1237)

John of Scotland
- Earl of Chester
- The coat of arms of John of Scotland, 7th Earl of Chester.
- Predecessor: Matilda of Chester; Countess of Salisbury suo jure
- Successor: Extinct – reverted to crown
- Other names: John de Scotia, the Scot
- Born: 1207
- Died: 6 June 1237 (aged 30)
- Spouse: Elen ferch Llywelyn the Elder (1222–1237; his death)
- Parents: David of Scotland, Earl of Huntingdon; Matilda of Chester

John of Scotland (or John de Scotia or John le Scot), 9th Earl of Huntingdon and 7th Earl of Chester (c. 1207 – 6 June 1237), sometimes known as "the Scot", was an Anglo-Scottish magnate, the son of David of Scotland, Earl of Huntingdon by his wife Matilda of Chester, daughter of Hugh de Kevelioc.

John married Elen ferch Llywelyn, daughter of Llywelyn the Great, in about 1222.

John became Earl of Huntingdon in 1219 on the death of his father.

On the death of John's maternal uncle, Ranulph de Blondeville, Earl of Chester, on 26 October 1232, the Earldom of Chester was inherited by John's mother Matilda (Maud) of Chester (Ranulph's eldest sister). Less than a month later with the consent of the King, she gave an inter vivos gift of the earldom to her son John who became Earl of Chester by right of his mother. He was formally invested by King Henry III as Earl of Chester on 21 November 1232. He became Earl of Chester in his own right six weeks later on the death of his mother in January 1233.

John died childless on 6 June 1237, aged 30. He too, like his uncle Ranulph before him, left three sisters as his co-heiresses. They agreed to share the estates between them and to make William de Forz, the husband of Christian, the eldest sister, Earl of Chester and Huntingdon, by right of his wife. However Henry III decided that the earldoms should be annexed to the crown "lest so fair a dominion should be divided among women". In 1246, Henry bought the honour (estate) of Chester from John's four sisters. The earldom of Chester was recreated for Simon de Montfort in 1264, and the earldom of Huntingdon was recreated in 1337 for William de Clinton.

Peerage of England
Preceded by David of Scotland	Earl of Huntingdon; 1219–1237	Vacant Reverted to crown Title next held by William de Clinton
Preceded by Matilda of Chester	Earl of Chester; 1232–1237	Vacant Reverted to crown Title next held by Simon de Montfort
