= David, Earl of Huntingdon =

Scottish prince and earl of Huntingdon (1152–1219)

David of Scotland
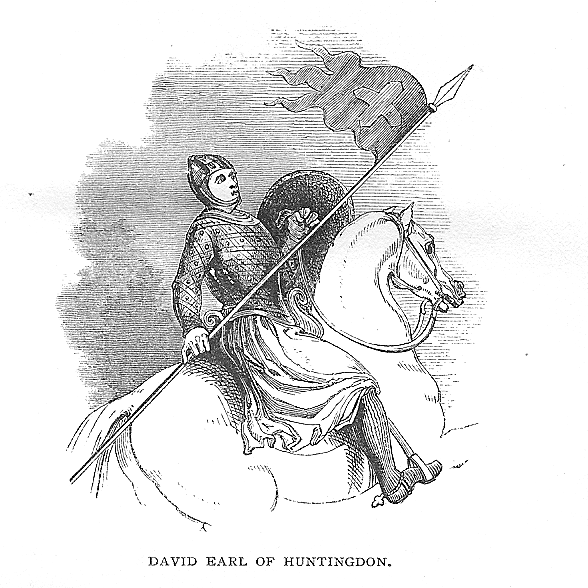

Earl of Huntingdon
- Reign: 1184–1219
- Predecessor: Simon III de Senlis
- Successor: John, Earl of Huntingdon
- Born: 1152; Huntingdon, England
- Died: 17 June 1219 (aged 66–67); Jedburgh, Roxburghshire, Scotland
- Spouse: Matilda of Chester
- Issue: John, Earl of Huntingdon and Chester; Henry of Huntingdon; Robert of Huntingdon; Margaret of Huntingdon; Isobel of Huntingdon; Ada of Huntingdon; Matilda of Huntingdon illegitimate: Henry of Stirling; Henry of Brechin; Ada
- House: Dunkeld
- Father: Henry of Scotland, 3rd Earl of Huntingdon
- Mother: Ada de Warenne

David of Scotland (1152 – 17 June 1219) was a Scottish prince and Earl of Huntingdon. He was the grandson of David I and the younger brother of two Scottish kings, Malcolm the Maiden and William the Lion.

== Life ==
Born in 1152, David was the youngest surviving son of Henry of Scotland, 3rd Earl of Huntingdon and Ada de Warenne, a daughter of William de Warenne, 2nd Earl of Surrey, and Elizabeth of Vermandois. His paternal grandfather was David I of Scotland. Huntingdon was granted to him after his elder brother William I of Scotland ascended the throne. David's son John succeeded him to the earldom.

Between 1179 and 1182 David was given the Lordship of the Garioch in Aberdeenshire by his brother, King William. In 1190 William gave him 'superiority' over Dundee and its port. The same year he endowed Lindores Abbey in Fife and a church dedicated to St Mary in Dundee. He granted Mugdrum Island and the fishing rights around it to the monks of Lindores, while retaining a fish trap in the channel separating it from the southern shore of the Firth of Tay for the exclusive use of his own household.

David was in Perth when the town was flooded in the autumn of 1209 and had to be evacuated in a small boat with other members of the royal family.

In the litigation for succession to the crown of Scotland in 1290–1292, Floris V, Count of Holland, the great-great-grandson of David's sister, Ada, claimed that David had renounced his hereditary rights to the throne of Scotland. He therefore declared that his claim to the throne had priority over David's descendants. However, no explanation or firm evidence for the supposed renunciation could be provided.

== Marriage and issue ==
On 26 August 1190, David married Matilda of Chester (1171 – 6 January 1233), daughter of Hugh de Kevelioc, 3rd Earl of Chester, and wife Bertrade de Montfort. He was almost twenty years Matilda's senior. The marriage was recorded by Benedict of Peterborough.

David and Matilda had:

1. Margaret of Huntingdon (c. 1194 – c. 1228), married Alan, Lord of Galloway, by whom she had two daughters, including Dervorguilla of Galloway.
2. Robert of Huntingdon (died young)
3. Ada of Huntingdon, married Sir Henry de Hastings, by whom she had one son, Henry de Hastings, 1st Baron Hastings.
4. Matilda (Maud) of Huntingdon (died after 1219, unmarried)
5. Isobel of Huntingdon (1199–1251), married firstly, Henry de Percy and had issue and secondly, Robert Bruce, 4th Lord of Annandale, by whom she had two sons, including Robert de Brus, 5th Lord of Annandale.
6. John of Scotland, Earl of Huntingdon (1207 – 6 June 1237), married Elen ferch Llywelyn. He succeeded his uncle Ranulf as Earl of Chester in 1232, but died childless.
7. Henry of Huntingdon (died young)

Earl David also had three illegitimate children:

1. Henry of Stirling
2. Henry of Brechin
3. Ada, married Malise, son of Ferchar, Earl of Strathearn

After the extinction of the senior line of the Scottish royal house in 1290, when the legitimate line of William the Lion of Scotland ended, David's descendants were the prime candidates for the throne. The two most notable claimants to the throne, Robert Bruce, 5th Lord of Annandale (grandfather of King Robert I of Scotland) and John Balliol were his descendants through David's daughters Isobel and Margaret, respectively.

== In literature and popular culture ==
Sir Walter Scott's 1825 novel The Talisman features Earl David in his capacity as a prince of Scotland as a crusader on the Third Crusade. For the majority of the novel, Earl David operates under an alias: Sir Kenneth of the Couchant Leopard. Earl David's adventures are highly fictionalized for this novel. In the TV series Robin of Sherwood David is the father of the second Robin, Robert of Huntington. This David is portrayed as a widower with no other children and only two brothers; the unnamed king of Scotland and a younger brother called Edgar.

== Sources ==
- Gee, Loveday Lewes (2002). Women, Art and Patronage from Henry III to Edward III: 1216-1377. Boydell Press.
- Oram, Richard (2011). Domination and Lordship: Scotland, 1070-1230. Edinburgh University Press.
- Stringer, Keith John (1985). Earl David of Huntingdon, 1152-1219: a study in Anglo-Scottish history. Edinburgh University Press.

David, Earl of Huntingdon House of Dunkeld Born: c. 1144 Died: 17 June 1219
Peerage of England
Preceded by Simon III of Senlis	Earl of Huntingdon; 1184–1219	Succeeded by John of Scotland
