= Isobel of Huntingdon =

Wife of Robert de Brus, 4th Lord of Annandale

- Born: 1199
- Died: 1251 (aged 51–52)
- Spouse: Robert de Brus, 4th Lord of Annandale
- Issue: Robert de Brus, 5th Lord of Annandale; Bernard I de Brus of Connington and Exton; Beatrice de Brus
- House: Dunkeld
- Father: David of Scotland, 8th Earl of Huntingdon
- Mother: Matilda of Chester

Isobel of Huntingdon (1199–1251), also known as Isobel the Scot, was the younger daughter of David of Scotland, 8th Earl of Huntingdon, grandson of David I of Scotland, by his marriage to Matilda of Chester.

== Marriage ==
She married Robert Bruce, 4th Lord of Annandale, and through her came the claims firstly of her son in 1290 and later in the beginning of 14th century of her great-grandson Robert Bruce, 7th Lord of Annandale, to the Scottish throne. Her above-mentioned son Robert Bruce, 5th Lord of Annandale was regent and recognized heir presumptive of Scotland in the years just before her death.

Isobel survived her husband Robert who died in 1232. She did not remarry and she herself died in 1251. She was buried at Sawtry Abbey, alongside her husband and her father.

== Issue ==
Isobel and her husband Robert de Brus had at least two sons and one daughter:

- Robert de Brus, who became the 5th Lord of Annandale and married Isabel de Clare, daughter of Gilbert de Clare Earl of Hertford and Gloucester; had issue.
- Bernard de Brus of Exton, married firstly Alice de Beauchamp, daughter of William de Beauchamp of Elmley, and married secondly Constance de Merston, widow of John de Morteyn; was the father of Sir Bernard de Brus II.
- Beatrice de Brus, married Hugo de Neville.
