= Maud of Gloucester, Countess of Chester =

English noble

Maud of Gloucester
- Countess of Chester
- Born: 1120
- Died: 29 July 1189 (aged 68–69)
- Spouse: Ranulf de Gernon, 4th Earl of Chester
- Issue: Hugh de Kevelioc, 5th Earl of Chester; Richard of Chester; Beatrice of Chester; Ranulf of Chester
- Father: Robert, 1st Earl of Gloucester
- Mother: Mabel FitzRobert, Countess of Gloucester

Maud of Gloucester, Countess of Chester (died 29 July 1189), also known as Matilda, was an Anglo-Norman noblewoman and the daughter of Robert, 1st Earl of Gloucester, an illegitimate son of King Henry I of England, and Mabel, daughter and heiress of Robert Fitzhamon. Her husband was Ranulf de Gernon, 4th Earl of Chester (died 16 December 1153).

== Family ==
Maud was born on an unknown date, the daughter of Robert, 1st Earl of Gloucester and Mabel FitzRobert of Gloucester. She had seven siblings, including William Fitz Robert, 2nd Earl of Gloucester and Roger, Bishop of Worcester. She also had an illegitimate half-brother, Richard, Bishop of Bayeux, whom her father sired with Isabel de Douvres.

Maud's paternal grandparents were King Henry I of England and one of his mistresses, possibly Sybil Corbet or a daughter of Rainald Gay. Her maternal grandparents were Robert Fitzhamon, Lord of Gloucester and Glamorgan; and Sybil de Montgomery, daughter of Roger de Montgomery, 1st Earl of Shrewsbury and Mabel Talvas of Bellême.

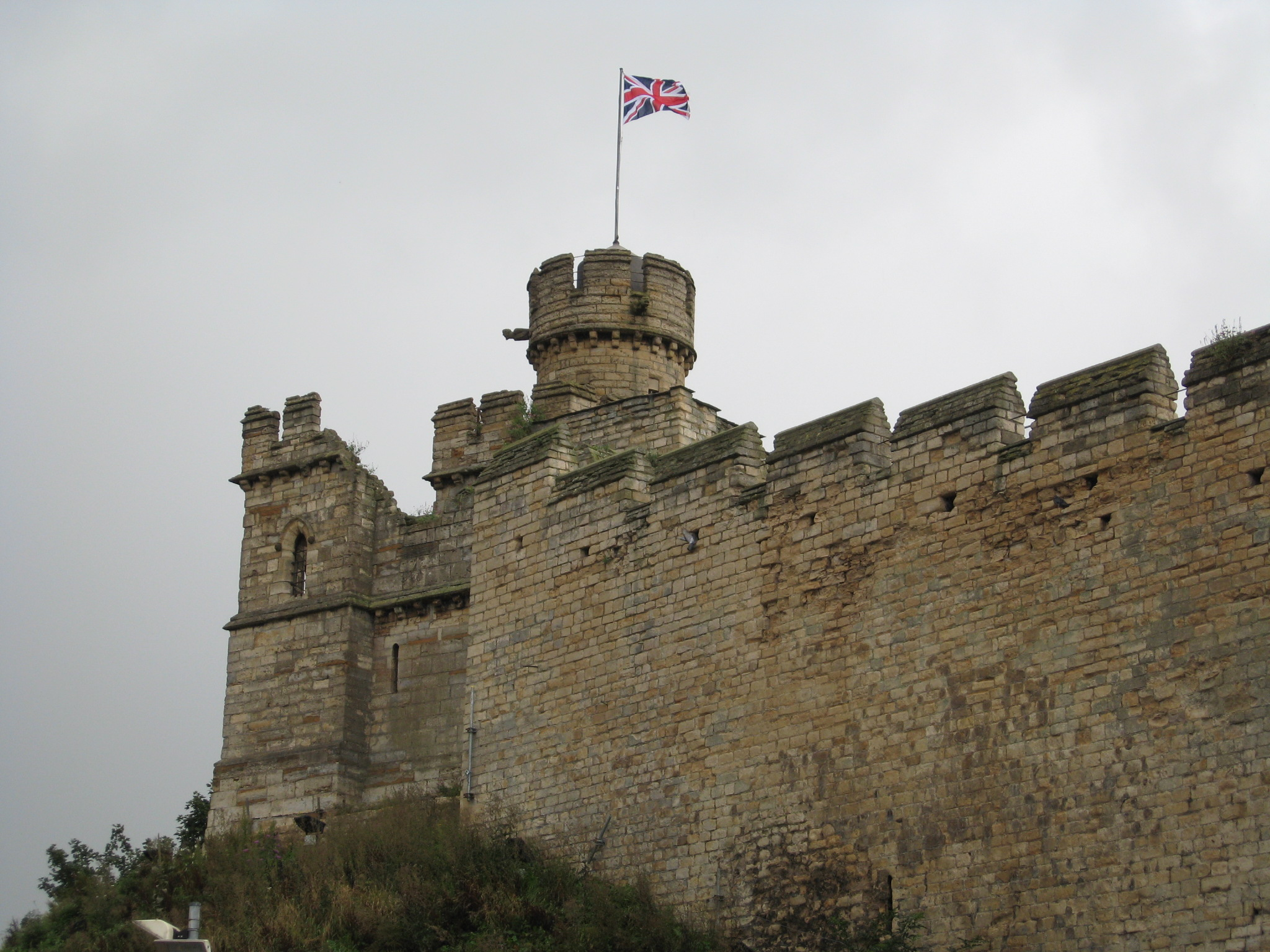
Lincoln Castle where Maud was besieged by the forces of King Stephen in 1141

== Marriage and issue ==
Sometime before 1141, possibly as early as 1135, Maud married Ranulf de Gernon, 4th Earl of Chester, and was accorded the title of Countess of Chester. Her husband had considerable autonomy in his palatine earldom.

In January 1141, Ranulf and Maud were at Lincoln Castle when it was besieged by the forces of King Stephen of England. The following month, a relief army loyal to Empress Matilda and led by her half-brother Robert, Earl of Gloucester, who was Maud's father, defeated and captured Stephen in the fierce fighting, later known as the First Battle of Lincoln. In return for his help in repelling the king's troops, the Earl of Gloucester compelled the countess's husband to swear fealty to the Empress Matilda.

On 29 August 1146, Ranulf was seized by King Stephen at court in Northampton. Stephen later granted him the castle and city of Lincoln.

== Children ==
- Hugh de Kevelioc, 5th Earl of Chester (1147 – 30 June 1181), married Bertrade de Montfort of Évreux, by whom he had five children, including Ranulf de Blondeville, 6th Earl of Chester; Matilda of Chester, Countess of Huntingdon; and Hawise of Chester, 1st Countess of Lincoln
- possibly Richard of Chester (died 1170/1175), buried in Coventry
- Beatrice of Chester, married Raoul de Malpas
- possibly Ranulf of Chester; fought in the siege of Lisbon; granted the lordship of Azambuja by Afonso I of Portugal

Ranulf had an illegitimate son, Robert FitzCount (died before 1166), by an unknown mistress. His date of birth was not recorded. Robert married Agnes FitzNeal; he was her second husband.

One account contains an unsubstantiated rumor that Maud poisoned her husband with the assistance of William Peverel of Nottingham, but there is no evidence that she did so. Earl Ranulf confirmed her grant to one of her servants, probably on his deathbed. She served as her minor son's guardian for nine years.

Maud was an important patron of Repton Priory in Derbyshire. She also made grants to Belvoir Priory.

The Rotuli de Dominabus of 1185 records property Wadinton de feodo comitis Cestrie, held by Maud, Countess of Chester. Although she was said to be about 50 years of age in that document, she was probably closer to 60 in that year.

Maud died on 29 July 1189, although the Annals of Tewkesbury records her death in 1190.
