= Château d'Avranches =

Former castle in Normandy

Coordinates: 48.68°N 1.361°W

The Château d'Avranches (French pronunciation: [ʃato davʁɑ̃ʃ]) was a castle in Avranches, Manche, France.

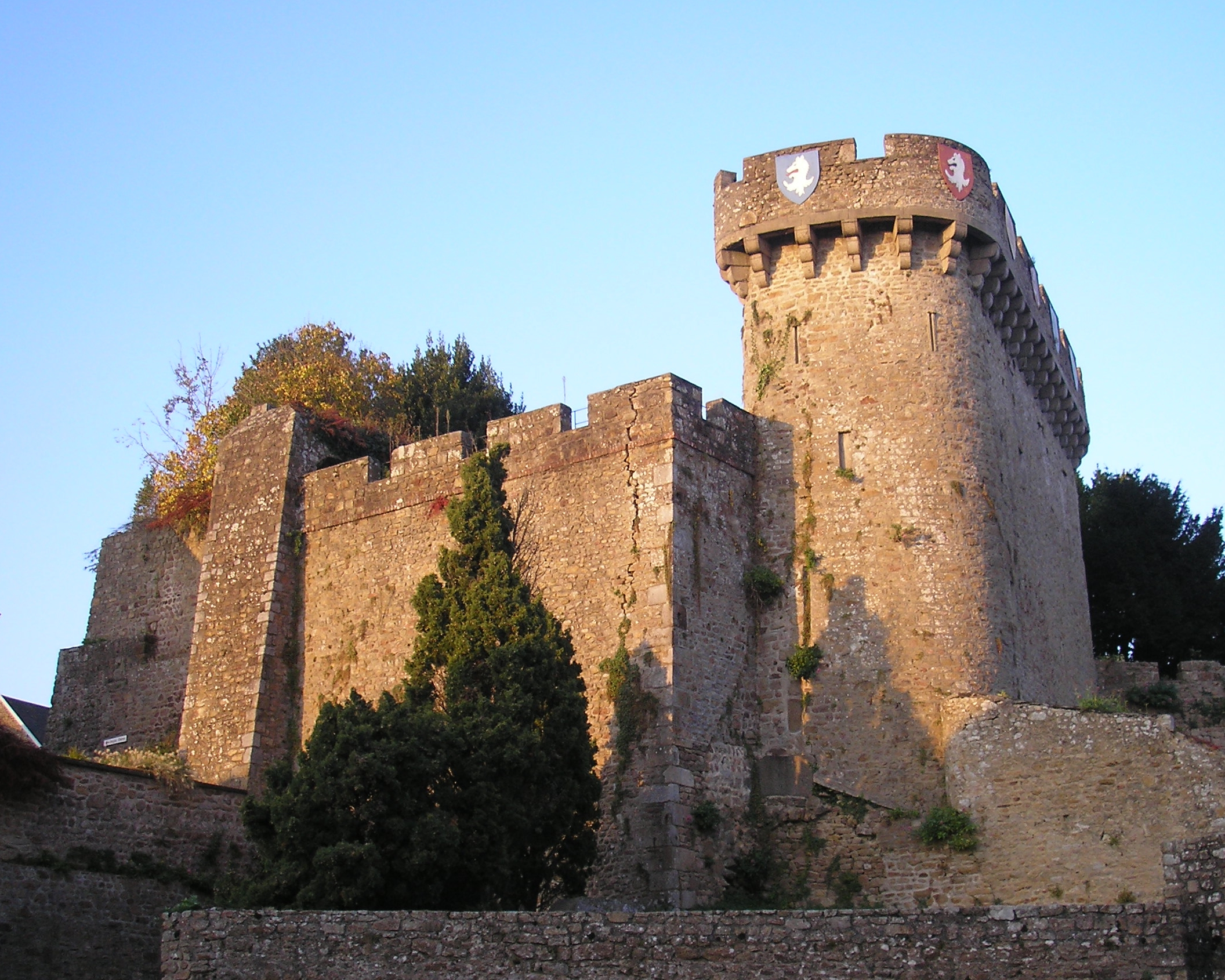
Château d'Avranches in 2017

A castle has existed at Avranches since the 10th century. It was besieged by Francis I, Duke of Brittany, and Arthur de Richemont, with the English garrison surrendering on 12 May 1450. All that remains of it is a portion of the ramparts.
