= Ranulf de Blondeville, 6th Earl of Chester =

Anglo-Norman nobleman (1170-1232)

Ranulf de Blondeville
- 6th Earl of Chester
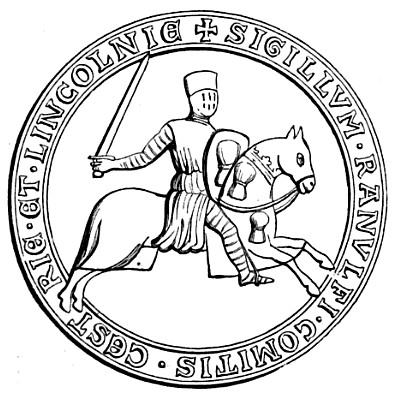
- SIGILLUM RANULFI COMITIS CESTRIE ET LINCOLNIE ("Seal of Ranulf Count of Chester and of Lincoln"). His arms of a "garb of wheat" are visible on his shield and on his horse's caparison, and became common as "arms of patronage" borne by the later Cheshire gentry (see e.g. Scrope v Grosvenor).
- Tenure: 1181–1232
- Predecessor: Hugh of Cyfeiliog, 5th Earl of Chester
- Successor: Matilda of Chester, Countess of Salisbury (suo jure)
- Born: 1170; Montgomeryshire, Powys, Wales
- Died: 26 October 1232 (aged 61–62); Wallingford, Berkshire, England
- Buried: Chester Abbey, Chester
- Spouses: Constance of Brittany (annulled 1199); Clemence de Fougères
- Father: Hugh de Kevelioc, 5th Earl of Chester
- Mother: Bertrade of Évreux

Ranulf de Blondeville, 6th Earl of Chester and 1st Earl of Lincoln (1170 – 26 October 1232), known in some references as the 4th Earl of Chester (in the second lineage of the title after the original family line was broken after the 2nd Earl), was one of the "old school" of Anglo-Norman barons whose loyalty to the Angevin dynasty was consistent but contingent on the receipt of lucrative favours. He has been described as "almost the last relic of the great feudal aristocracy of the Conquest".

== Early life ==
Ranulf, born in 1170, in Montgomeryshire, Powys, Wales was the eldest son of Hugh of Cyfeiliog and Bertrade de Montfort d'Evreux. He was said to have been small in physical stature.

Ranulf succeeded to the earldom of Chester (like his father before him) as a minor (aged eleven) and was knighted in 1188 or 1189, which gave him control of his estates in England and Normandy. Although he used, not inconsistently, the style Duke of Brittany on account of his marriage, he never had the control of the duchy, and is not known to have played an important role there.

== Lands ==
Ranulf de Blondeville originally inherited the viscounty of Avranches and the County of Chester along with substantial English lands (Chester itself was not considered part of England). He lost the viscounty of Avranches in 1204 with the Capetian conquest of Normandy but he still held substantial estates; at the end of the 12th century he was supposed to be able to muster 80 knights from his Cheshire lands and his English lands were supposed to be able to muster 118 knights which would have meant Ranulf could have mustered 198 knights, in theory.

The reality was that when called for campaign he was asked not to bring so many knights (usually he was asked to bring between seven and 20) as it would have been too much of a financial burden. This figure doesn't include his acquisition of the Earldom of Lincoln in 1217.

Through his most powerful vassal the de Lacy constable of Chester he was also overlord of the honours of Clitheroe and Pontefract, Halton and the Lordship of Bowland which were large baronies with dozens of fiefs attached to them. Whether or not these lands were included in the 118 knights' fiefs on English lands is not known. Ranulf held several important developing manors and market towns such as Frodsham, Macclesfield in Cheshire and Chipping Campden in Gloucestershire.

In addition to the manors which were held by sub-tenants the earl, of course, had manors of his own and he owned several castles, too, in the County of Chester, including Chester Castle and Shotwick Castle. When he became earl of Lincoln he acquired or built Lincoln Castle, Bolingbroke Castle, Beeston Castle and Chartley Castle. In his capacity as Viscount of Avranches, he would have also owned Château d'Avranches until 1204. He also was temporarily the Castellan of the important Oxfordshire castle Wallingford Castle.

== Chronology of Ranulf's career ==
=== Early career ===
In 1188 or 1189, Ranulf married Duchess Constance of Brittany, the widow of Henry II's son Duke Geoffrey II of Brittany. Henry had been engaged in a long-running struggle with the House of Pontièvre, and wanted the duchess married to a magnate under his control. The marriage gave Ranulf control of the earldom of Richmond, but it was not a success and the couple separated.

In 1196, King Richard I nominated the nine-year-old Arthur, son of Constance and Geoffrey, as his heir presumptive, and summoned him and his mother, Duchess Constance, to Normandy. This was, at least in part, a move to strengthen Richard's power over the Duchy of Brittany, which his father Henry had never fully achieved. Constance left Nantes and travelled towards Rouen. Richard arranged for Ranulf to abduct Constance and Arthur en route. Richard then marched to Normandy at the head of an army to make a show of "rescuing" his nephew. However, Arthur had been secretly taken away by his tutor to the French court to be brought up with Louis, son of the French king Philip II. In 1198, after considerable political pressure from the Bretons, Richard released Constance from Ranulf's custody. Constance successfully petitioned for the dissolution of the marriage on the grounds of desertion.

In 1200 Ranulf cemented his power in Normandy by marrying Clemence of Fougères; she was the daughter of William of Fougères, widow of Alan de Dinant, and sister of Geoffrey of Fougères. He had opposed John's attempted coup of 1193–4, and retained many contacts with partisans of his former stepson Arthur. He spent most of 1199–1204 in France and his continued loyalty was bought by John with further patronage. However, the King was suspicious of the Earl, perhaps with some reason. In the winter of 1204–5, Ranulph, suspected of dealings with the rebellious Welsh and of contemplating revolt himself, had extensive estates temporarily confiscated by the king. This episode apparently convinced Ranulph to show loyalty in future. Thereafter he was showered with royal favours. In return he fought John's Welsh wars 1209–12; helped secure the peace with the pope in 1213–14, and was with the king in Poitou in 1214.

Loyal to the king in 1215–16, he was one of the few magnates to witness Magna Carta of 1215, which he would later adapt to appease his own barons in the form of the Magna Carta of Chester. He played a leading military role in the civil war by virtue of his extensive estates and numerous castles. Ranulf stood with William Marshal and the earls of Derby and Warwick with the king, whilst the other nobility of the land stood with the enemy or remained aloof from the conflict.

=== Regency ===
Chester was appointed in 1215 Lord of the County of Lancashire with the power to appoint sheriffs. He was also High Sheriff of Lancashire, High Sheriff of Staffordshire and High Sheriff of Shropshire in 1216. On John's death in 1216, Ranulf's influence increased further. There was an expectation at Gloucester that Ranulf would contend the regency for the young Henry III. Events moved quickly at Gloucester, where William Marshal and the young king were, in Ranulf's absence. The Marshal was put forward and offered the regency by the nobility and clerics gathered at Gloucester before the arrival of Ranulf. There was concern that Ranulf might object to the decision, but when he arrived (29 October 1216) he stated that he did not want to be regent, so any potential conflict vanished.

=== Campaign of 1217 ===
Before John's death, rebel barons had offered the throne of England to Louis, the dauphin. Louis had invaded the country during the summer of 1216 and had taken Winchester. De Blondeville put his political weight behind re-issuing Magna Carta in 1216 and 1217; his military experience was used in defeating the rebels at Lincoln in 1217. Ranulf was based in the north midlands and was charged with stopping the northern barons from linking up with Louis in the south.

The Earl chose to combine personal concerns with those of the country by attacking Saer de Quincy, 1st Earl of Winchester's castle at Mountsorrel in Leicestershire—from which the Earl of Winchester's predecessors had ousted Ranulf's grandfather, Ranulf de Gernon. Louis was persuaded by the Earl of Winchester to send a relief force to the castle. When they arrived, de Blondeville and the Royalist force were gone. In fact, they had headed to Lincoln to deal with a French force besieging the castle there.

William Marshal with his main army at Northampton also made for the city, and at Lincoln a battle was fought between the Royalists headed by William Marshal and de Blondeville and the French forces and their allies. The battle went in favour of the Royalists, and they captured forty-six Barons and the Earls of Winchester and Hereford and the Earl of Lincoln, recently created by Louis the French king. Following the battle in recognition of his support, Ranulf was created Earl of Lincoln by King Henry III of England on 23 May 1217.

=== Fifth Crusade ===
In 1218, de Blondeville decided to honour the crusading vow he had made three years previously, and he journeyed eastwards. He met up with the counts of Nevers and La Marche in Genoa, accompanied by the earls of Derby, Arundel and Winchester. They then sailed on towards Egypt and the Nile. An icy winter in camp was followed by a burning summer which affected the morale of the crusaders greatly.

During September 1219, the Sultan, wary of the conflict outside Damietta, offered the crusaders a startling bargain—Bethlehem, Nazareth, Jerusalem, and central Palestine and Galilee, so long as the Crusaders gave up their war in Egypt. Ranulf was one of many voices in support of taking the offer, and was supported by his English peers.

However, Bishop Pelagius, the Patriarch of Jerusalem and the military orders would have none of it. They finally refused the offer and on 5 November they found the walls of Damietta poorly manned, so they attacked and secured the city. When winter came the army was smouldering with discontent. Ranulf left Damietta in September 1220, with his fellow English earls, leaving behind an indecisive force under the command of Bishop Pelagius and the Military Orders. Upon the crusade's failure, he returned to England to find his rival, William Marshal dead and the government in the hands of Hubert de Burgh.

=== Final years ===
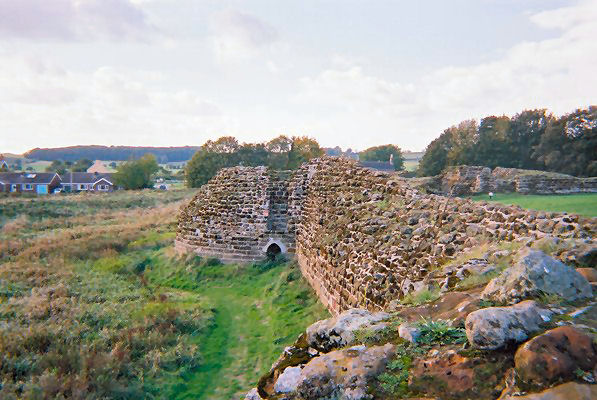
The ruins of Bolingbroke Castle in Lincolnshire, built by Ranulf

From 1220 to 1224, tensions grew between government officials and old loyalists of King John. This flared into open conflict in the winter of 1223–4 when Ranulf among others briefly tried to resist de Burgh's policy of resumption of sheriffdoms and royal castles. Ranulf built Bolingbroke Castle near Spilsby in Lincolnshire around 1220, later the birthplace of King Henry IV, as well as Chartley Castle in Staffordshire, and Beeston Castle in Cheshire. Ranulf was briefly made castellan of Wallingford Castle. He made an alliance with Llywelyn the Great, whose daughter Elen married Ranulf's nephew and heir, John the Scot, in about 1222.

De Blondeville's final years saw him acting as an elder statesman, witnessing the 1225 re-issue of Magna Carta, playing a prominent role in the dispute in 1227 over Forest Laws and, as a veteran, leading Henry III's army on the ill-fated Poitou expedition of 1230–1. He came to lead the campaign after the death of William Marshal (the younger). He showed vigour and made a thrust into Anjou, but by the end of June, the French had reached the Breton border. Ranulf concluded the campaign with a truce with the King of France for three years, to end in 1234.

Ranulf kept in sight his personal advantage. In 1220 some of his estates avoided carucage; in 1225 aid was not levied in Cheshire; and in 1229 he successfully resisted the ecclesiastical tax collector. His only major failure, in old age, was not avoiding the 1232 levy of the fortieth on his lands.

== Ranulf's death ==
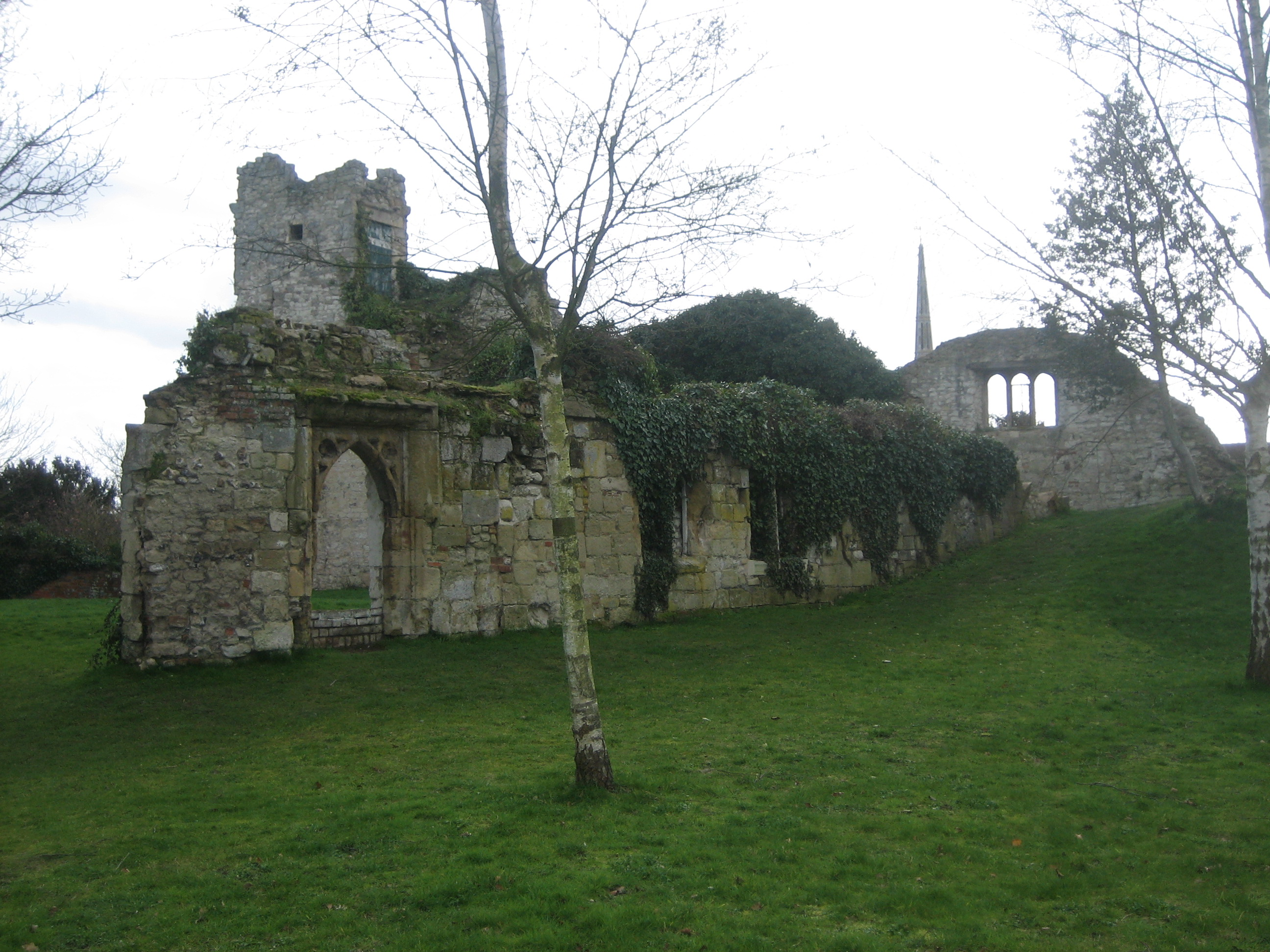
Wallingford Castle in Oxfordshire (previously Berkshire)

Ranulf died at Wallingford on 26 October 1232, aged sixty. His viscera were buried at Wallingford Castle, his heart at Dieulacres Abbey, which he had founded, and the remainder of his body at St Werburg's in Chester. Because he had no children, his estates passed to his four sisters: (1) Maud (Matilda), wife of David, Earl of Huntingdon, and mother of John of Scotland, Earl of Huntingdon; (2) Mabel, wife of William d'Aubigny, 3rd Earl of Arundel; (3) Agnes (Alice), wife of William de Ferrers, 4th Earl of Derby; and (4) Hawise of Chester, 1st Countess of Lincoln, wife of Robert de Quincy.

Ranulf's second sister Mabel and his eldest sister Matilda (Maud) shared the estates with their other sisters. Ranulf's third sister Agnes (Alice) inherited, along with a share in other estates with her sisters, lands between the Ribble and the Mercy rivers, Powis Castle near Welshpool in Wales, Chartley Castle, Staffordshire, and land at Bugbrooke, Northamptonshire. Ranulf's youngest sister Hawise inherited the honour and castle of Bolingbroke, other large estates such as Lindsey and Halland in Lincolnshire, and a share of other estates with her sisters.

Prior to Ranulf's death, however, he had also made Hawise, his youngest sister, an inter vivos gift, after receiving dispensation from the Crown, of the Earldom of Lincoln. In April 1231 he granted her the title by a formal charter under his seal which was confirmed by King Henry III. She was formally invested as suo jure 1st Countess of Lincoln on 27 October 1232, the day after Ranulf's death. She held the Earldom of Lincoln until less than a month later with the consent of the king she likewise gifted the earldom inter vivos to her daughter Margaret de Quincy and her son-in-law, John de Lacy, 2nd Earl of Lincoln. They were formally invested by King Henry III as Countess and Earl of Lincoln on 23 November 1232.

After his death, his nephew, John the Scot (son of his eldest sister Matilda (Maud) of Chester), was formally invested by King Henry III as Earl of Chester on 21 November 1232, which suggests a prior agreement.

== In popular culture ==
"Ranulf Earl of Chester" is mentioned in the same line as Robin Hood in Piers Plowman, the first definite reference to stories circulating about the latter figure.

As an important figure in the reigns of kings Richard I and John, Ranulf appears in novels set in the period.

Ranulf de Blondeville is a supporting character in James Goldman's 1979 novel Myself as Witness set in the reign of King John. Goldman's narrator describes Ranulf as the "only living Visigoth" and condemns him for killing many Welshman in his capacity as an Anglo-Norman lord of the Welsh Marches. He is represented as a brutal and aggressive opponent of all things, and people, Welsh.

He appears early in Sharon Kay Penman's novel Falls the Shadow, on the life and career of Simon de Montfort, 6th Earl of Leicester, when he promises to personally support Simon's appeal to the king to recognise his right to the impoverished Leicester earldom.

Ranulf makes a brief appearance in Lauren Johnson's 2013 novel The Arrow of Sherwood participating in the siege of Nottingham in 1194.

Ranulf is mentioned several times over the course of the 1980s television series Robin of Sherwood.

== Notes ==
Peerage of England
Preceded by (vacant)	Earl of Lincoln; 1217–1231	Succeeded by Hawise of Chester; Countess of Chester suo jure
Preceded by Hugh of Cyfeiliog	Earl of Chester; 1181–1232	Succeeded by John of Scotland, Earl of Huntingdon
