= Elen ferch Llywelyn =

- Countess of Huntingdon and Chester
- The arms of the Aberffraw House of Gwynedd were traditionally first used by Elen's grandfather, Iorwerth Drwyndwn.
- Born: c. 1207
- Died: 1253 (aged 46–47)
- Spouse: John of Scotland, Earl of Huntingdon; Sir Robert de Quincy
- Issue: Hawise de Quincy
- House: Aberffraw
- Father: Llywelyn the Great
- Mother: Joan, Lady of Wales

Elen ferch Llywelyn (c. 1207 – 1253) was the daughter of Llywelyn the Great of Gwynedd in North Wales by Joan, Lady of Wales, the illegitimate daughter of King John of England.

Elen married John of Scotland, 9th Earl of Huntingdon, in about 1222. He died aged thirty in 1237, and she was forced by King Henry III (her mother's half-brother) to marry Sir Robert de Quincy, the son of Saer de Quincy. Their daughter, Hawise, married Baldwin Wake, Lord Wake of Liddell. Hawise's granddaughter, Margaret Wake, was the mother of Joan of Kent, the first English Princess of Wales.

== Ancestry ==
Ancestors of Elen ferch Llywelyn

16. Gruffudd ap Cynan
8. Owain Gwynedd
17. Angharad ferch Owain ab Edwin
4. Iorwerth Drwyndwn
18. Llywarch ap Trahaearn
9. Gwladus ferch Llywarch
19. Dyddgu ferch Iorwerth
2. Llywelyn ab Iorwerth
20. Maredudd ap Bleddyn
10. Madog ap Maredudd
21. Hunydd ferch Einudd
5. Margred ferch Madog
22. Gruffudd ap Cynan
11. Susanna ferch Gruffudd
23. Angharad ferch Owain ab Edwin
1. Elen ferch Llywelyn
24. Geoffrey Plantagenet, Count of Anjou
12. Henry II of England
25. Empress Matilda
6. John, King of England
26. William X, Duke of Aquitaine
13. Eleanor, Duchess of Aquitaine
27. Aénor de Châtellerault
3. Joan, Lady of Wales (ill.)
7. Clemence

== Elen ferch Llywelyn in fiction ==
- Child of the Phoenix by Barbara Erskine
- Here Be Dragons by Sharon Kay Penman
- Falls the Shadow by Sharon Kay Penman: In Penman's version, Elen and Robert de Quincy are lovers, and she marries him immediately on John's death despite her father's opposition.
