= Hugh de Kevelioc, 5th Earl of Chester =

Anglo-French magnate (1147–1181)

Hugh de Kevilioc
- 5th Earl of Chester
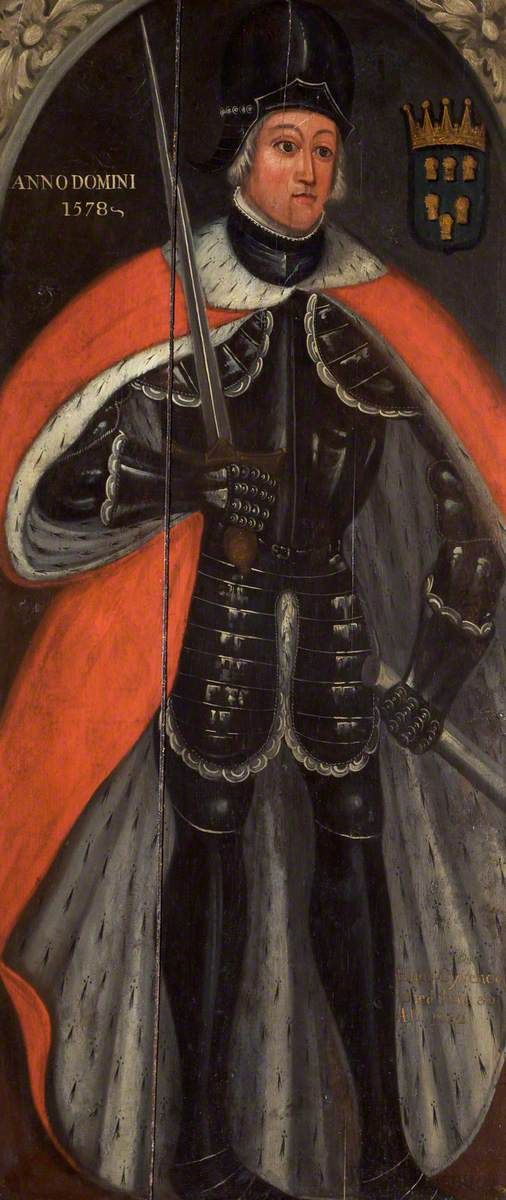
- Portrait of Hugh de Kevilioc, 5th Earl of Chester
- Tenure: 1153–1181
- Predecessor: Ranulf de Gernon, 4th Earl of Chester
- Successor: Ranulf de Blondeville, 6th Earl of Chester
- Born: 1147 possibly Cyfeiliog (a region in the county of Montgomeryshire, Powys), Wales
- Died: 30 June 1181 (aged 33–34); Leek, Staffordshire, England
- Buried: Chester Cathedral
- Spouse: Bertrade of Évreux
- Issue: Ranulf III of Chester; Maud of Chester; Mabel of Chester; Agnes of Chester; Hawise of Chester
- Father: Ranulf de Gernon, 4th Earl of Chester
- Mother: Maud of Gloucester

Hugh de Kevilioc, 5th Earl of Chester, (/kəˈvaɪliɒɡ/ kə-VY-lee-og, Welsh: [kəˈvɛiljɔɡ]; 1147 – 30 June 1181), also written Hugh of Cyfeiliog or Hugh de Kevilioc, was an Anglo-Norman magnate who was active in England, Wales, Ireland and France during the reign of King Henry II of England.

== Origins ==
Born in 1147, he was the son of Ranulf II, 4th Earl of Chester, and his wife Maud, daughter of Robert, 1st Earl of Gloucester, who was an illegitimate son of King Henry I of England. A later tradition claims he was born in the Cyfeiliog district of Wales.

== Career ==
On his father's death in 1153, he became heir to extensive estates. In France, these included the hereditary viscounties of Avranches, Bessin, and Val de Vire, as well as the honours of St Sever and Briquessart. In England and Wales, there was the earldom of Chester with its associated honours. Together, they made him one of the most important Anglo-Norman landholders when he was declared of age in 1162 and took possession. He quickly took his place among King Henry II's magnates, being present at Dover in 1163 for the renewal of the Anglo-Flemish alliance and in 1164 at the Council of Clarendon.

In 1173, however, he joined the revolt of the king's sons and led the rebels in Brittany. After sending an army of Brabantines, who forced the rebels to retreat into the castle of Dol, in August 1173 Henry arrived in person to lead the siege. Hugh and his companions, with no food left, surrendered after being promised no executions or mutilations. Held prisoner in various castles, he made his peace with Henry and was one of the witnesses of the Treaty of Falaise in October 1174 that ended hostilities.

At the Council of Northampton in January 1177 his lands were restored, but not his castles, and in March he was a witness to Henry's arbitration between the kings of Castile and Navarre. Then in May, at the Council of Windsor, Henry restored his castles and ordered him to Ireland. There is no record of him gaining any military successes or grants of land there.

He died on 30 June 1181 at Leek in Staffordshire and was buried beside his father on the south side of the chapter house of St Werburgh's Abbey in Chester, now Chester Cathedral. His successor was his only legitimate son.

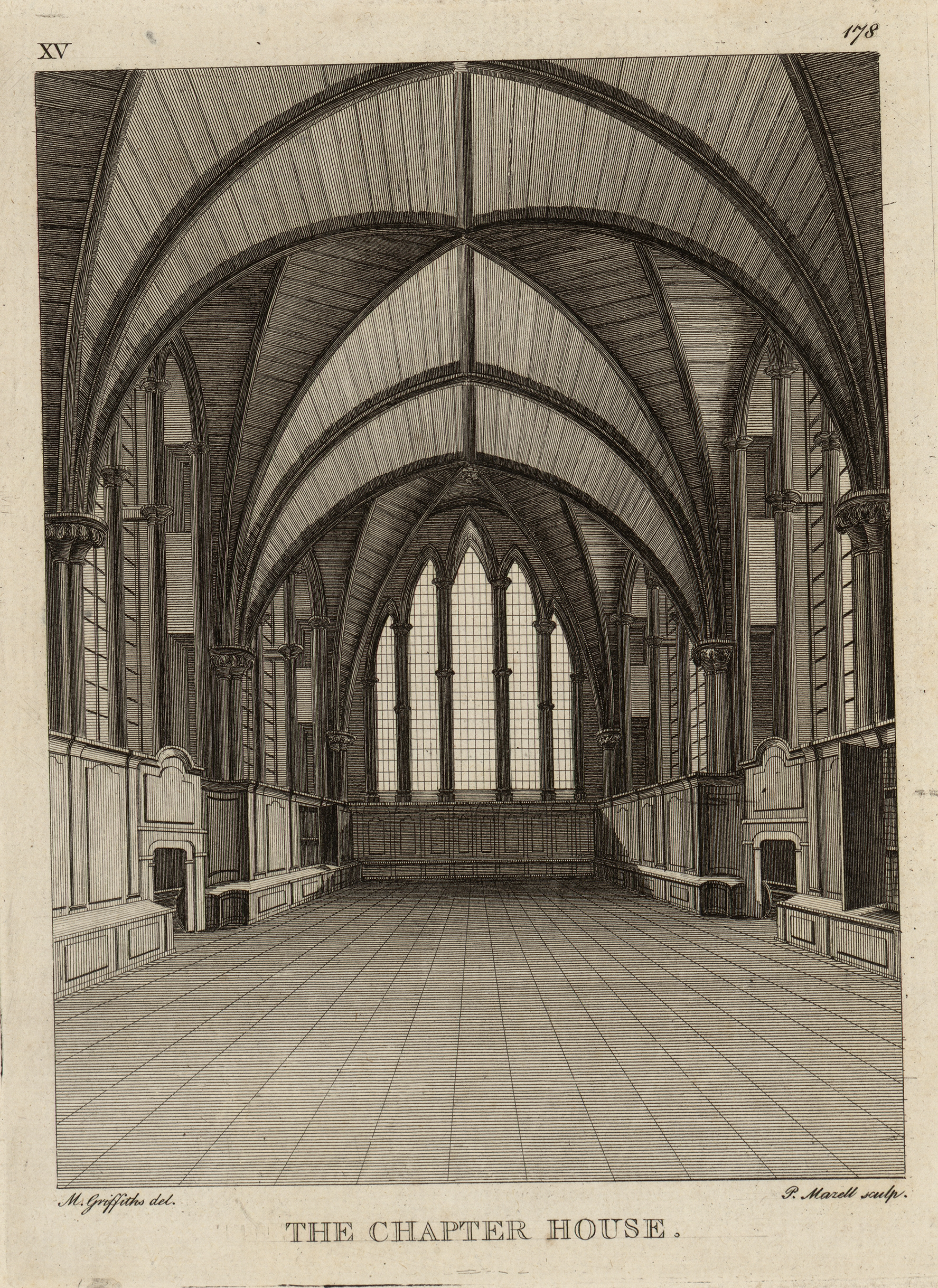
Chapter house of Chester Cathedral

== Benefactions ==
During his life he made grants to St Werburgh's Abbey at Chester, to Stanlow Abbey, to St Mary's Priory at Coventry, to Bullington Priory, to Greenfield Priory, to Trentham Priory, and to Bordesley Abbey. He also confirmed grants of his parents to Calke Abbey, to St Mary-on-the-Hill, Chester, and to the Abbey of Saint-Étienne, Caen, in Normandy.

== Family ==
In 1169 he married Bertrade, daughter of Simon III de Montfort, Count of Évreux, who in turn was the son of Amaury III of Montfort. Their children were:

- Ranulf III, who became 6th Earl of Chester but died childless in 1232, when his four legitimate sisters became his heirs.
- Maud, who married David of Scotland, 8th Earl of Huntingdon.
- Mabel, who married William d'Aubigny, 3rd Earl of Arundel.
- Agnes, who married William de Ferrers, 4th Earl of Derby.
- Hawise, who married Robert II de Quincy.

Known illegitimate children were: Pagan; Roger; Amice, who married Ranulf Mainwaring, justice of Chester; and an unknown daughter who married Richard Bacon, founder of Rocester Abbey. Other illegitimate daughters have been claimed: one called Beatrix was alleged to have married a William Belward, while another unnamed daughter was said to have married Llywelyn the Great.

Peerage of England
Preceded by Ranulf II de Gernon	Earl of Chester; 1153–1181	Succeeded by Ranulf III de Blondeville
