= Ranulf de Gernon, 4th Earl of Chester =

Anglo-Norman baron

Ranulf de Gernon
- Earl of Chester
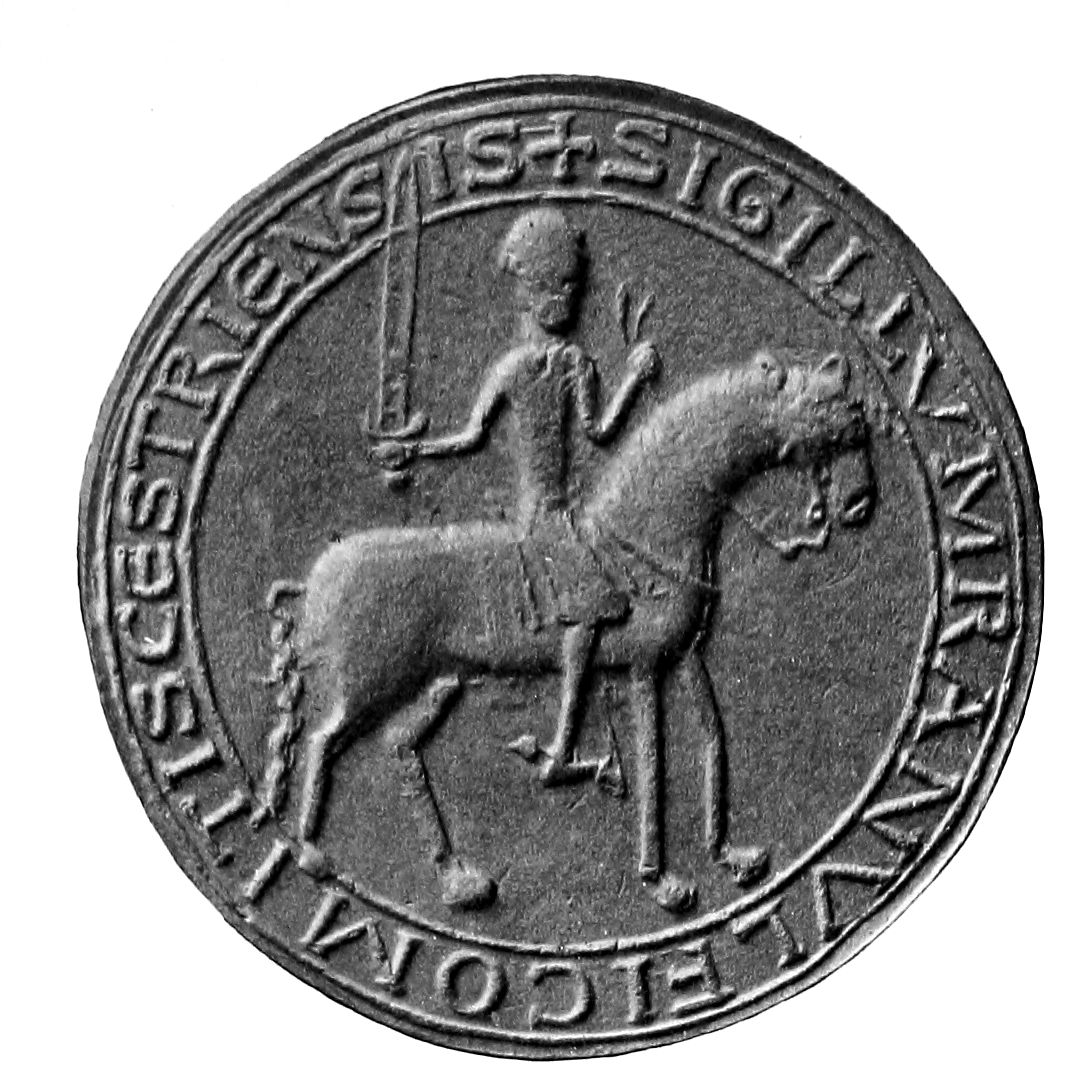
- Seal
- Tenure: 1128–1153
- Predecessor: Ranulf le Meschin, 3rd Earl of Chester
- Successor: Hugh of Cyfeiliog, 5th Earl of Chester
- Born: 1099; Guernon castle, Calvados, France
- Died: 16 December 1153 (aged 53–54); Cheshire, England
- Cause of death: Succumbed to poisoning
- Spouse: Maud of Gloucester
- Issue Detail: Hugh of Cyfeiliog, 5th Earl of Chester; Beatrice
- Father: Ranulf le Meschin, 3rd Earl of Chester
- Mother: Lucy of Bolingbroke

The arms of Ranulf de Gernon, 4th Earl of Chester

Ranulf II (also known as Ranulf de Gernon), 4th Earl of Chester (1099–1153), was an Anglo-Norman baron who inherited the honour of the palatine county of Chester and the viscountcy of Avranches upon the death of his father Ranulf le Meschin, 3rd Earl of Chester. He was descended from the Counts of Bessin in Normandy.

In 1136 David I of Scotland invaded England as far as Durham, which led Stephen of England to negotiate treaties that involved granting Ranulf's lands around Carlisle to Scotland. Thereafter, Ranulf allied himself to Matilda to further his cause. He took Lincoln Castle in 1141, which was retaken by Stephen in a siege in which Ranulf was forced to flee for his life. Ranulf enlisted the help of Robert, 1st Earl of Gloucester to retake the castle and succeeded when King Stephen surrendered to him at Lincoln. While Matilda ruled England, Stephen's queen Matilda of Boulogne managed to defeat Ranulf and his allies at Winchester, which eventually resulted in Stephen being able to resume the throne.

== Biography ==
=== Early life ===
Ranulf was born in Normandy at the Château Guernon, in 1099. He was the son of Ranulf Meschin, 3rd Earl of Chester and Lucy of Bolingbroke, who were both significant landowners with considerable autonomy within the county palatine. His father had begun a new lineage of the earldom of Chester. Ranulf married Maud, daughter of Robert, 1st Earl of Gloucester and inherited the earldom of Chester in 1128. Three years later he founded an abbey in North Wales, colonised by monks from the Norman Congregation of Savigny.

He and Maud had at least three children and possibly more:

- Hugh of Cyfeiliog, 5th Earl of Chester (1147 – 30 June 1181), married Bertrade de Montfort of Évreux
- possibly Richard of Chester (died 1170/1175), buried in Coventry
- Beatrice of Chester, married Raoul de Malpas
- possibly Ranulf of Chester; fought in the siege of Lisbon; granted the lordship of Azambuja by Afonso I of Portugal

=== Loss of northern lands to Scotland ===
In late January 1136, during the first months of the reign of Stephen of England, his northern neighbour, David I of Scotland, crossed the border into England. He took Carlisle, Wark, Alnwick, Norham, and Newcastle upon Tyne and struck towards Durham. On 5 February 1136, Stephen reached Durham with a large force of mercenaries from Flanders and forced David to negotiate a treaty by which the Scots were granted the towns of Carlisle and Doncaster, for the return of Wark, Alnwick, Norham, and Newcastle.

Lost from England to Scotland, along with Carlisle, was much of Cumberland and the honour of Lancaster, lands that belonged to Earl Ranulf's father and had been surrendered by agreement to Henry I of England in return for the Earldom of Chester. Ranulf claimed that his father had at that time been disinherited. When he heard of the concessions made to the Scottish King, Ranulf left Stephen's court in a rage.

In the second Treaty of Durham (1139), Stephen was even more generous to David, granting the Earldom of Northumbria (Carlisle, Cumberland, Westmorland, and Lancashire north of the Ribble) to his son, Prince Henry. Ranulf was prepared to revolt in order to win back his lordship of the north.

=== Capture of Lincoln ===
By this time Matilda, named as the future Queen by her father Henry I, had gathered enough strength to contest Stephen's usurpation. She was supported by her husband Geoffrey of Anjou and her half-brother Robert of Gloucester. Prince Henry was to attend the English court that Michaelmas and Ranulf planned to overwhelm him on his return to Scotland. Stephen's queen Matilda of Boulogne heard about the plot and persuaded Stephen to escort Henry back to Scotland. Ranulf then used subterfuge to seize Lincoln Castle. He and his half-brother, William de Roumare, sent their wives to visit the constable's wife there and then arrived (dressed in ordinary clothes and escorted by three knights), apparently to fetch the ladies. They then seized the weapons in the castle, admitted their own men, and ejected the royal garrison.

Stephen eventually made a pact with Ranulf and his half-brother and left Lincolnshire, returning to London before Christmas 1140, after making William de Roumare Earl of Lincoln and awarding Ranulf with administrative and military powers over Lincolnshire and the town and castle of Derby. The citizens of Lincoln sent Stephen a message complaining about the treatment they were receiving from Ranulf and asking the King to capture the brothers. The King immediately marched on Lincoln. One of his key pretexts was that according to the settlement, Lincoln Castle was to revert to royal ownership and that the half-brothers had reneged on this. He arrived on 6 January 1141 and found the place scantily garrisoned: the citizens of Lincoln admitted him into the city and he immediately laid siege to the castle, captured seventeen knights and began to batter down the garrison with his siege engines.

Ranulf managed to escape to his earldom, collect his Cheshire and Welsh retainers and appeal to his father-in-law Robert of Gloucester, whose daughter Maud was still besieged in Lincoln, possibly as a deliberate ploy to encourage her father's assistance. In return for Robert's aid, Ranulf agreed to promise fidelity to the Empress Matilda.

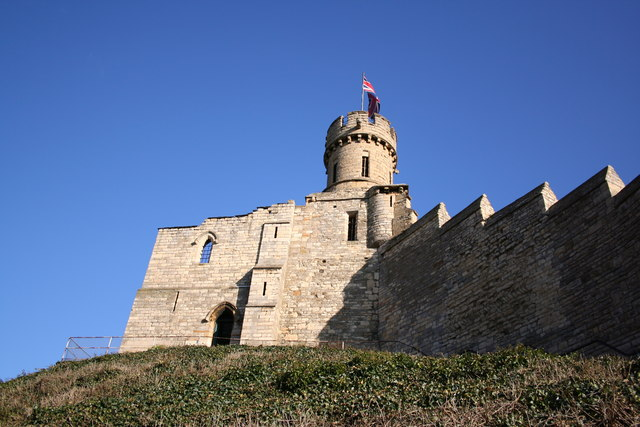
Lincoln castle

To Robert and the other supporters of the Empress, this was good news, as Ranulf was a major magnate. Robert swiftly raised an army and set out for Lincoln, joining forces with Ranulf on the way. Stephen held a council of war at which his advisors counselled that he leave a force and depart to safety, but Stephen disregarded the odds and decided to fight, but was obliged to surrender to Robert. Ranulf took advantage of the disarray amongst the king's followers and in the weeks after the fighting managed to take the Earl of Richmond's northern castles and capture him when he tried to ambush Ranulf. Richmond was put in chains and tortured until he submitted to Ranulf and did him homage.

Stephen had been effectively deposed and Matilda ruled in his place. In September 1141, Robert of Gloucester and Matilda besieged Winchester. The queen responded quickly and rushed to Winchester with her own army, commanded by the professional soldier William of Ypres. The queen's forces surrounded the army of the empress, commanded by Robert, who was captured as a result of deciding to fight his way out of the situation. The magnates following the empress were forced to flee or be taken captive. Earl Ranulf managed to escape and fled back to Chester. Later that year Robert was exchanged for Stephen, who resumed the throne.

=== Defection to Stephen ===
In 1144, Stephen attacked Ranulf again by laying siege to Lincoln Castle. He made preparations for a long siege but abandoned the attempt when eighty of his men were killed whilst working on a siege tower that fell and knocked them into a trench, suffocating them all.

In 1145 (or early 1146), Ranulf switched allegiance from the Empress Matilda to Stephen. Since 1141, King David had been allied to Matilda, so Ranulf could now take up his quarrel with David of Scotland regarding his northern lands. It is probable that Ranulf's brother-in-law Phillip, (the son of Earl Robert), acted as an intermediary as Phillip had defected to the king. Ranulf came to Stephen at Stamford, repented his previous crimes and was restored to favour. He was allowed to retain Lincoln Castle until he could recover his Norman lands. Ranulf demonstrated his goodwill by helping Stephen to capture Bedford from Miles de Beauchamp and bringing 300 knights to the siege of Wallingford.

Stephen welcomed Ranulf's support but some of the king's supporters, (especially William de Clerfeith, Gilbert de Gant, Alan, 1st Earl of Richmond, William Peverel the Younger, William d'Aubigny, 1st Earl of Arundel and John, Count of Eu), did not. Many of the magnates were alarmed when it was discovered that Ranulf wanted the king to take part in a campaign against the Welsh. Ranulf's opponents counselled the king that the earl might be planning treachery since he had offered no hostages or security and could easily be ambushed in Wales. Stephen contrived a quarrel with Ranulf at Northampton, provoked by an advisor who told the earl that the king would not assist him unless he restored all the property he had taken and rendered hostages. The earl refused these terms. He was accused of treason and was arrested and imprisoned in chains until his friends succeeded in coming to terms with the King on 28 August 1146. It was then agreed that the earl should be released, provided he surrendered all the royal lands and castles he had seized (Lincoln included), returned hostages and took a solemn oath not to resist the king in future.

Ranulf, arrested in contravention of the oath which the king had sworn to him at Stamford, revolted as soon as he regained his liberty and "burst into a blind fury of rebellion, scarcely discriminating between friend or foe”. He came with his army to Lincoln to recover the city but failed to break into its north gate and his chief lieutenant was slain in the fighting. Ranulf also tried to recover the castle at Coventry, by building a counter castle. The King came with a relief force to Coventry and although wounded in the fighting, drove Ranulf off and seized his hostages, including his nephew Gilbert fitz Richard de Clare, Earl of Hertford, whom Stephen refused to release unless Gilbert surrendered his own castles. Gilbert, while agreeing to the condition, revolted as soon as he was at liberty. This action pushed the Clares into a conflict from which they had previously remained aloof.

=== Agreement with King David ===
In May 1149, the young Henry FitzEmpress met the king of Scotland and Ranulf at Carlisle, where Ranulf resolved his territorial disputes with Scotland and an agreement was reached to attack York. Stephen hurried north with a large force and his opponents dispersed before they could reach the city. The southern portion of the honour of Lancaster (the land between the Ribble and the Mersey) was conceded to Ranulf, who in return resigned his claim on Carlisle. Hence the Angevin cause secured the loyalty of Ranulf.

Henry, whilst trying to escape south after the aborted attack on York, was forced to avoid the ambushes of Eustace, King Stephen's son. Ranulf assisted Henry, creating a diversion by attacking Lincoln, thus drawing Stephen to Lincoln and allowing Henry to escape.

=== Treaty with Robert, Earl of Leicester ===
The Earl's territory in Leicestershire and Warwickshire brought him face to face with Robert de Beaumont, 2nd Earl of Leicester, whose family (including his cousin Roger de Beaumont, 2nd Earl of Warwick and his brother Waleran de Beaumont, 1st Earl of Worcester) controlled a large part of the south Midlands. The two earls concluded an elaborate treaty between 1149 and 1153. The Bishops of Chester and Leicester were both entrusted with pledges that were to be surrendered if either party infringed the agreement.

=== Death ===
In 1153, Henry, by then Stephen's accepted heir, granted Staffordshire to Ranulf. That year, whilst Ranulf was a guest at the house of William Peverel the Younger, his host attempted to kill him with poisoned wine. Three of his men who had drunk the wine died, while Ranulf suffered agonizing pain. A few months later Henry became king and exiled Peverel from England as punishment. Ranulf succumbed to the poison on 16 December 1153: his son Hugh inherited his lands as held in 1135 (when Stephen took the throne), while other honours bestowed upon Ranulf were revoked.

Peerage of England
Preceded by Ranulf le Meschin	Earl of Chester; 1129–1153	Succeeded by Hugh of Cyfeiliog
