= Baron Greenwich =

Peerage of the United Kingdom

- Arms of Charles, Prince of Wales, before his accession as King Charles III
- Creation date: 20 November 1947
- Creation: Second
- Created by: George VI
- Peerage: Peerage of the United Kingdom
- First holder: Philip, Duke of Edinburgh
- Last holder: Charles, Prince of Wales
- Remainder to: the 1st Baron's heirs male of the body lawfully begotten
- Status: Merged in the Crown
- Extinction date: 8 September 2022
- Former seat: Clarence House

Baron Greenwich was a title in the Peerage of the United Kingdom that has been created twice in British history.

== History ==
King Charles II of England planned to create the title "Countess of Greenwich" for Nell Gwyn, one of his low-born mistresses. This was to follow Charles II bestowing the titles of Duchess of Cleveland, Countess of Castlemaine, Baroness Limerick, and Baroness Nonsuch upon his other mistress, Barbara Palmer; the title of Viscountess Shannon upon his first mistress, Elizabeth Killigrew; and the titles of Duchess of Portsmouth, Duchess of Aubigny, Countess of Fareham, and Baroness Petersfield to yet another mistress, Louise de Kérouaille. However, Charles died on 6 February 1685, having never followed through on his original plans to ennoble Gwyn.

The first official creation of a baronial peerage related to Greenwich came in the Peerage of Great Britain in 1767, when Lady Caroline Townshend was made Baroness Greenwich, in the County of Kent, with remainder to the male issue by her second husband, Charles Townshend. She was the daughter of Field Marshal John Campbell, 2nd Duke of Argyll, who had been created Earl of Greenwich in 1715 and Duke of Greenwich in 1719, titles which became extinct on his death in 1743. As Caroline's two sons by her second husband predeceased her, the title became extinct upon her death in 1794.

The second creation came in the Peerage of the United Kingdom in 1947 when Lieutenant Philip Mountbatten, on the morning of his wedding to Princess Elizabeth (who became Queen Elizabeth II), was made Baron Greenwich, of Greenwich in the County of London. He was made Duke of Edinburgh and Earl of Merioneth at the same time. Prince Philip died in 2021, and the title passed to his son Prince Charles, until it merged with the Crown when Charles became King in 2022.

== Baronesses Greenwich; First creation (1767) ==
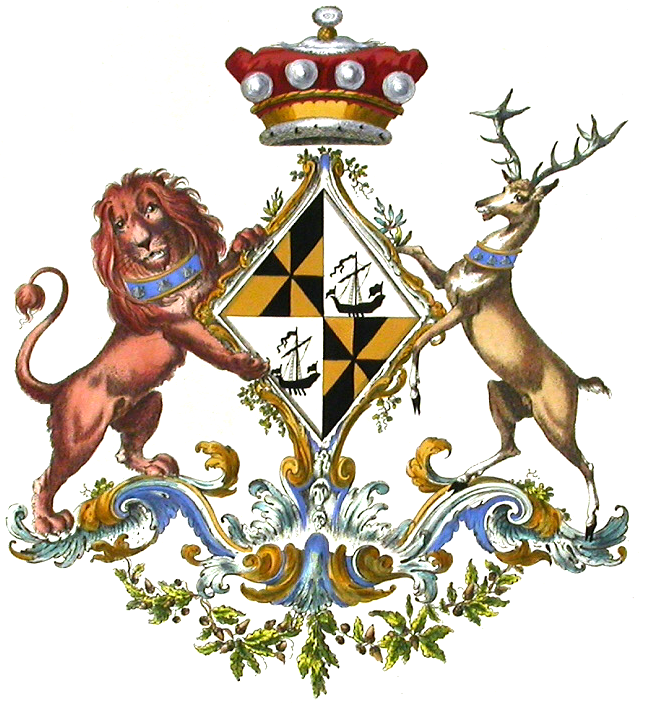
Coat of arms of the Baroness Greenwich (first creation).

- Caroline Townshend, 1st Baroness Greenwich (1717–1794)

== Barons Greenwich; Second creation (1947) ==
Coat of arms of the Baron Greenwich (second creation).

Earl	Portrait	Birth	Marriage(s)	Death
Prince Philip; Mountbatten; 1947–2021 also: Duke of Edinburgh and Earl of Merioneth (1947)	Prince Philip	10 June 1921; Mon Repos, Corfu son of Prince Andrew of Greece and Denmark and Princess Alice of Battenberg	Princess Elizabeth; 20 November 1947; 4 children	9 April 2021; Windsor Castle, Windsor aged 99
Prince Charles; House of Windsor; 2021–2022 also: Prince of Wales and Earl of Chester (1958), Duke of Cornwall, Duke of Rothesay (1952), Duke of Edinburgh and Earl of Merioneth (2021)	Prince Charles	14 November 1948; Buckingham Palace, London son of Prince Philip and Queen Elizabeth II	Lady Diana Spencer; 29 July 1981 – 28 August 1996; 2 children Camilla Parker Bowles; 9 April 2005	– now 78 years, 7 days old
Prince Charles succeeded as King Charles III on 8 September 2022 upon his mother's death, and his hereditary titles merged in the Crown.

== Other information ==
- Leigh Rayment's Peerage Pages
