= Earl of Merioneth =

Peerage of the United Kingdom

- Arms of Charles, Prince of Wales, before his accession
- Creation date: 20 November 1947
- Creation: First
- Created by: George VI
- Peerage: Peerage of the United Kingdom
- First holder: Philip, Duke of Edinburgh
- Last holder: Charles, Prince of Wales
- Remainder to: the 1st Earl's heirs male of the body lawfully begotten
- Status: Merged with crown
- Extinction date: 8 September 2022
- Former seat: Clarence House

Earl of Merioneth was a title in the Peerage of the United Kingdom created in 1947 along with the Duke of Edinburgh and the Baron Greenwich for Philip Mountbatten, later Prince Philip, upon his marriage to Princess Elizabeth, later Queen Elizabeth II.

Merionethshire is one of thirteen historic counties of Wales, a vice county and a former administrative county.

== Earls of Merioneth (1947) ==
Earl	Portrait	Birth	Marriage(s)	Death
Prince Philip; Mountbatten; 1947–2021 also: Duke of Edinburgh and Baron Greenwich (1947)	Prince Philip	10 June 1921; Mon Repos, Corfu son of Prince Andrew of Greece and Denmark and Princess Alice of Battenberg	Princess Elizabeth; 20 November 1947; 4 children	9 April 2021; Windsor Castle, Windsor aged 99
Prince Charles; House of Windsor; 2021–2022 also: Prince of Wales and Earl of Chester (1958), Duke of Cornwall, Duke of Rothesay (1952), Duke of Edinburgh and Baron Greenwich (2021)	Prince Charles	14 November 1948; Buckingham Palace, London son of Prince Philip and Queen Elizabeth II	Lady Diana Spencer; 29 July 1981 – 28 August 1996; 2 children Camilla Parker Bowles; 9 April 2005	– now 78 years, 7 days old
Prince Charles succeeded as Charles III in 2022 upon his mother's death, and his hereditary titles merged in the Crown.
