= Prince Philip, Duke of Edinburgh =

Consort of Elizabeth II from 1952 to 2021

Prince Philip
- Duke of Edinburgh
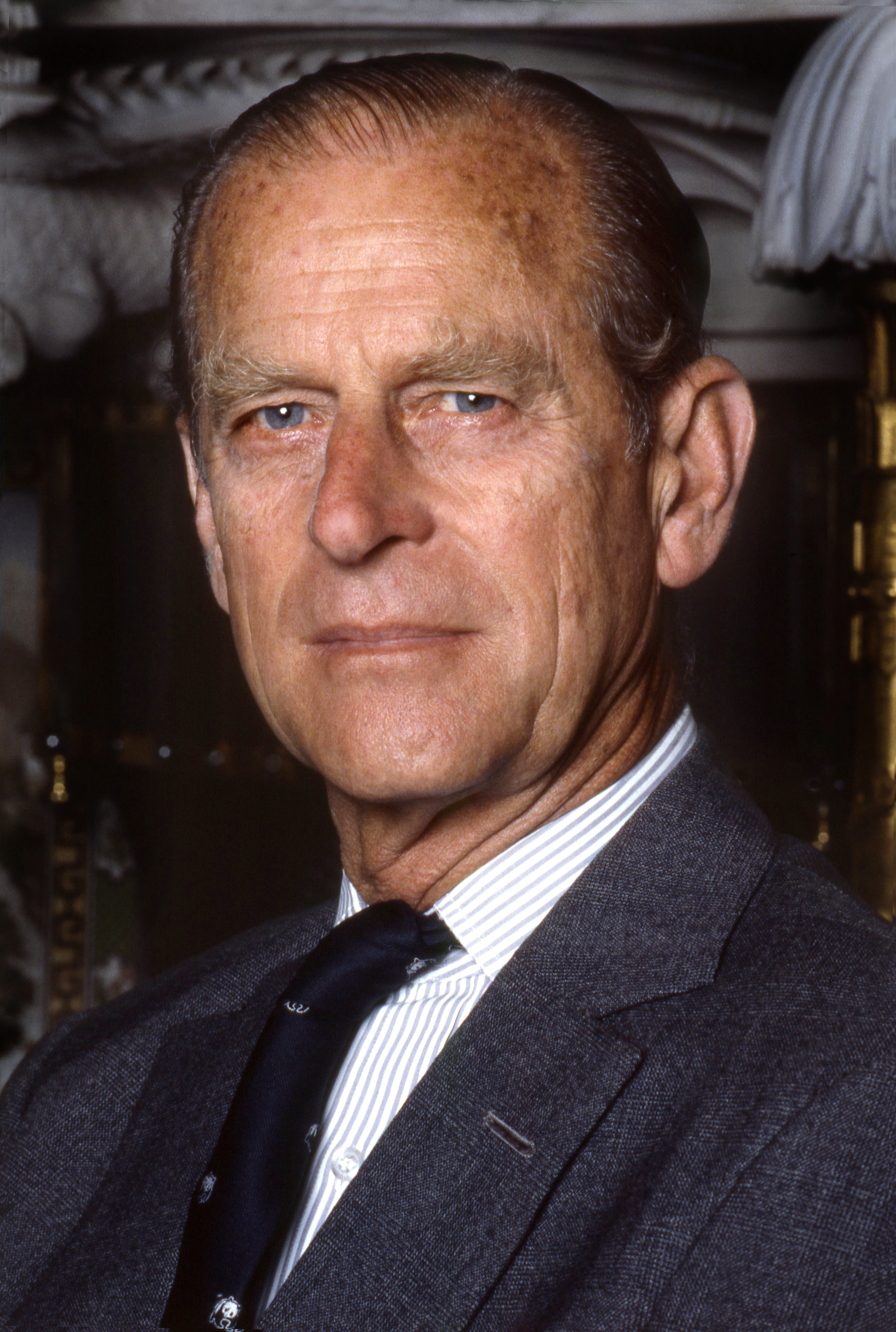
- Formal portrait, 1992

Consort of the British monarch
- Tenure: 6 February 1952 – 9 April 2021
- Born: Prince Philip of Greece and Denmark; 10 June 1921 (Note: Philip was born on 10 June 1921 according to the Gregorian calendar. Until March 1923, Greece used the Julian calendar, in which his birth date was 28 May 1921.); Mon Repos, Corfu, Greece
- Died: 9 April 2021 (aged 99); Windsor Castle, Windsor, England
- Burial: 17 April 2021 Royal Vault, St George's Chapel, Windsor Castle 19 September 2022 King George VI Memorial Chapel, St George's Chapel
- Spouse: Elizabeth II (m. 1947)
- Issue: Charles III; Anne, Princess Royal; Andrew Mountbatten-Windsor; Prince Edward, Duke of Edinburgh
- House: Glücksburg (by birth); Mountbatten (from 1947)
- Father: Prince Andrew of Greece and Denmark
- Mother: Princess Alice of Battenberg

Member of House of Lords
- Lord Temporal
- Hereditary peerage 21 July 1948 – 11 November 1999
- Preceded by: Seat established
- Succeeded by: Seat abolished
- Military career
- Allegiance: United Kingdom
- Branch: Royal Navy; British Army; Royal Air Force
- Years of active service: 1939–1952
- Rank: Full list
- Commands: HMS Magpie
- Conflicts: Second World War; Battle of Crete; Battle of Cape Matapan; Allied invasion of Sicily; Operation Dragoon; Operation Robson; Operation Lentil; Battle of Okinawa
- Awards: Mentioned in dispatches; Croix de Guerre with Palm; War Cross

Prince Philip, Duke of Edinburgh (born Prince Philip of Greece and Denmark, later Philip Mountbatten; 10 June 1921 – 9 April 2021), was the husband of Queen Elizabeth II and served as consort of the British monarch from her accession on 6 February 1952 until his death in 2021, making him the longest-serving royal consort in British history.

Philip was born in Greece into the Greek and Danish royal families. His family was exiled from the country when he was 18 months old. Educated in France, Germany, and the United Kingdom, he joined the Royal Navy in 1939 at the age of 18. In July 1939, he began corresponding with Princess Elizabeth, then aged 13, the elder daughter and heir presumptive of King George VI. During the Second World War, Philip served with distinction in the Mediterranean and Pacific fleets of the Royal Navy.

In the summer of 1946, King George VI granted Philip permission to marry Elizabeth, who was then 20. Prior to the official announcement of their engagement in July 1947, Philip renounced his Greek and Danish royal titles and styles, became a naturalised British subject, and adopted the surname Mountbatten from his maternal grandparents. In November 1947, he married Elizabeth, was granted the style "His Royal Highness", and was created Duke of Edinburgh, Earl of Merioneth, and Baron Greenwich. They had four children: Charles, Anne, Andrew, and Edward. Following Elizabeth's accession to the throne in 1952, Philip left active naval service, having attained the rank of commander. In 1957, he was formally created a British prince.

A keen sportsman, Philip played a significant role in the development of the equestrian discipline of carriage driving. He served as patron, president, or member of more than 780 organisations, including the World Wide Fund for Nature, and was chairman of The Duke of Edinburgh's Award, an international youth awards programme for people aged 14 to 24. Philip was the longest-lived male member of the British royal family. He retired from public duties in 2017 at the age of 96, having completed 22,219 solo engagements and delivered 5,493 speeches since 1952. He died at Windsor Castle in April 2021, aged 99.

== Early life and education ==
=== Family, infancy and exile from Greece ===
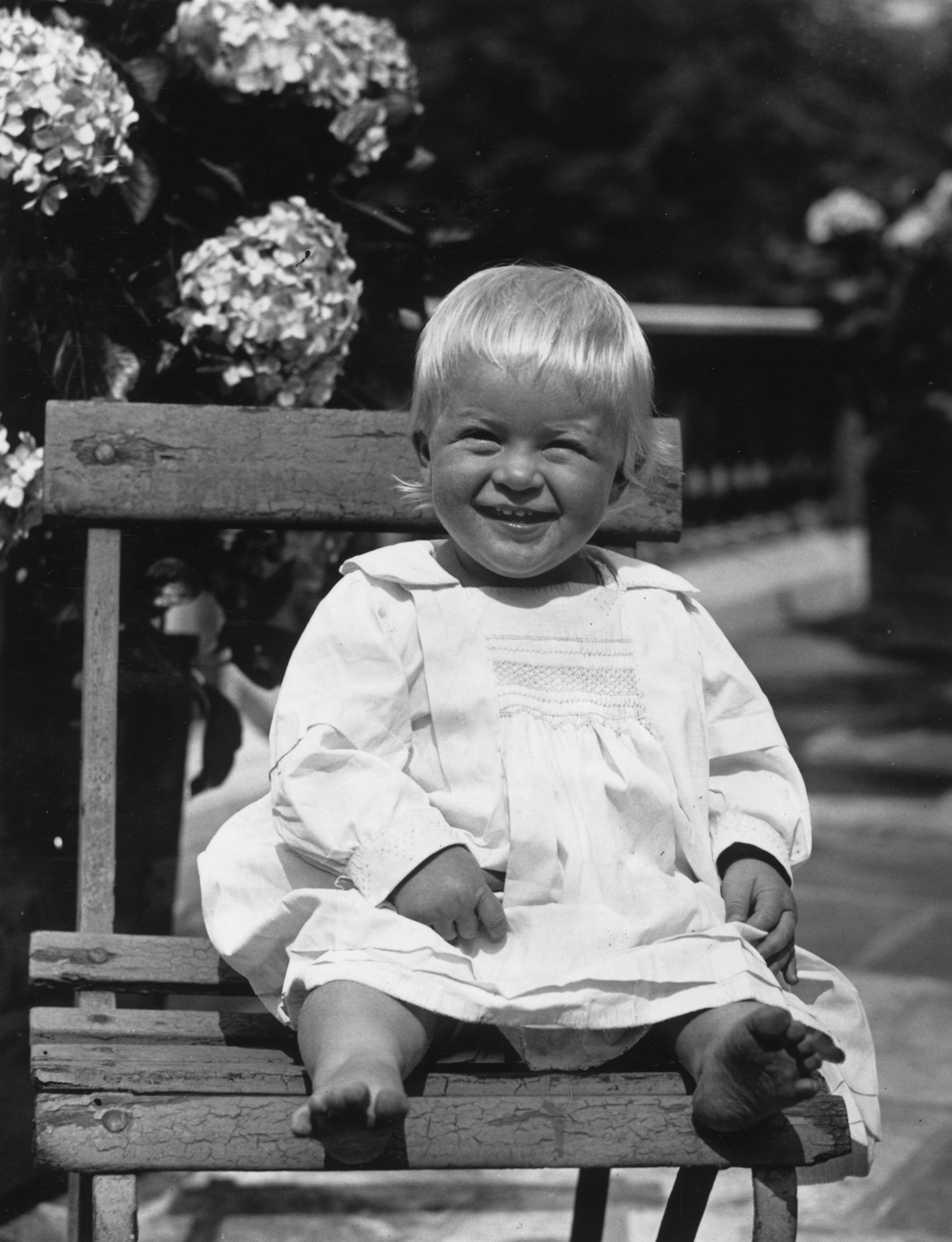
At age one, July 1922

Philip (Greek: Φίλιππος, romanised: Phílippos) was born on 10 June 1921 on the dining room table at Mon Repos, a villa on the Greek island of Corfu. He was the only son and the fifth and final child of Prince Andrew of Greece and Denmark and his wife, Princess Alice of Battenberg. Philip's father was the fourth son of King George I and Queen Olga of Greece, and his mother was the eldest child of Louis Mountbatten, 1st Marquess of Milford Haven, and Victoria Mountbatten, Marchioness of Milford Haven (formerly Prince Louis of Battenberg and Princess Victoria of Hesse and by Rhine). A member of the House of Glücksburg, Philip was a prince of both Greece and Denmark by virtue of his patrilineal descent from George I of Greece and George's father, Christian IX of Denmark; he was from birth in the line of succession to both thrones. (Note: The Danish Act of Succession 1953 removed the succession rights of his branch of the family in Denmark.) Philip's four elder sisters were Margarita, Theodora, Cecilie, and Sophie. He was baptised in the Greek Orthodox rite at St. George's Church in the Old Fortress in Corfu. His godparents were his paternal grandmother, Queen Olga of Greece; his cousin George, Crown Prince of Greece; his uncle Lord Louis Mountbatten; and the municipality of Corfu, represented by its mayor, Alexandros Kokotos, and by the president of the council, Stylianos Maniarizis.

Shortly after Philip's birth, his maternal grandfather died in London. The Marquess of Milford Haven was a naturalised British subject who, after a career in the Royal Navy, had renounced his German titles and adopted the surname Mountbatten – an Anglicised form of Battenberg – during the First World War owing to anti-German sentiment in the United Kingdom. After attending his grandfather's memorial service in London, Philip and his mother returned to Greece, where Andrew had remained to command a Greek Army division in the Greco-Turkish War.

Greece suffered significant losses in the conflict, while the Turkish forces made substantial gains. Philip's uncle, King Constantine I, who was high commander of the Greek expeditionary force, was blamed for the defeat and forced to abdicate in September 1922. The new military government arrested Andrew and several others. General Georgios Hatzianestis, the army's commanding officer, and five senior politicians were tried and executed in the Trial of the Six. Andrew's life was also believed to be in danger, and Alice was placed under surveillance. In December, a revolutionary court banished Andrew from Greece for life. The British naval vessel HMS Calypso evacuated Andrew's family, with the infant Philip carried to safety in a fruit box.

=== Upbringing in France, Britain and Germany ===
Philip's family settled in a house in the Paris suburb of Saint-Cloud lent to them by his wealthy aunt Princess George of Greece and Denmark. He was first educated at The Elms, an American school in Paris run by Donald MacJannet, who described him as a "know-it-all smarty person, but always remarkably polite". In 1930, Philip was sent to Britain to live with his maternal grandmother at Kensington Palace and with his uncle George Mountbatten, 2nd Marquess of Milford Haven, at Lynden Manor in Bray, Berkshire. He was then enrolled at Cheam School. Over the next three years, his four sisters married German princes and moved to Germany, his mother was diagnosed with schizophrenia and placed in an asylum, and his father settled in Monte Carlo. Philip had little contact with his mother for the remainder of his childhood.

In 1933, Philip was sent to Schule Schloss Salem in Germany, which had the "advantage of saving school fees", because it was owned by the family of his brother-in-law Berthold, Margrave of Baden. With the rise of Nazism, Salem's Jewish founder, Kurt Hahn, fled persecution and established Gordonstoun School in Scotland, to which Philip transferred after two terms at Salem. In 1937, his sister Cecilie; her husband, Georg Donatus, Hereditary Grand Duke of Hesse; their two sons; and Georg Donatus's mother were killed in an air crash at Ostend. Philip, then 16, attended the funeral in Darmstadt. Cecilie and Georg Donatus were members of the Nazi Party. The following year, Philip's uncle and guardian Lord Milford Haven died of bone marrow cancer. Milford Haven's younger brother, Lord Louis, assumed parental responsibility for Philip for the remainder of his youth.

Philip did not speak Greek because he had left Greece as an infant. In 1992, he said that he "could understand a certain amount". He stated that he considered himself Danish and spoke mostly English, while his family was multilingual. Known for his charm in his youth, Philip was linked to several women, including Osla Benning.

== Naval and wartime service ==
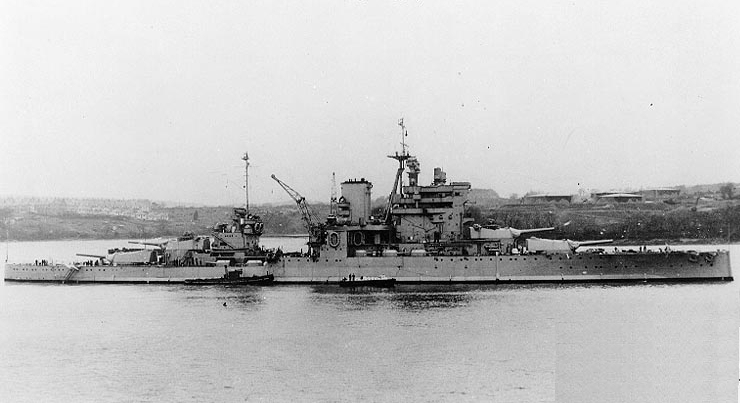
Philip served aboard HMS Valiant in the Battle of the Mediterranean.

After leaving Gordonstoun in early 1939, Philip completed a term as a cadet at the Royal Naval College, Dartmouth, then repatriated to Greece, living with his mother in Athens for a month in mid-1939. At the behest of King George II of Greece, his first cousin, he returned to Britain in September to resume training for the Royal Navy. He graduated from Dartmouth the next year as the best cadet in his course. During the Second World War, he continued to serve in the British forces, while two of his brothers-in-law, Prince Christoph of Hesse and Berthold, Margrave of Baden, fought on the opposing German side. Philip was appointed as a midshipman in January 1940. He spent four months on the battleship HMS Ramillies, protecting convoys of the Australian Expeditionary Force in the Indian Ocean, followed by shorter postings on HMS Kent, on HMS Shropshire, and in British Ceylon. After the invasion of Greece by Italy in October 1940, he was transferred from the Indian Ocean to the battleship HMS Valiant in the Mediterranean Fleet.

Philip was commissioned as a sub-lieutenant on 1 February 1941 after a series of courses at Portsmouth, in which he gained the top grade in four out of five sections of the qualifying examination. Among other engagements, he was involved in the Battle of Crete and was mentioned in dispatches for his service during the Battle of Cape Matapan, in which he controlled the battleship's searchlights. He was also awarded the Greek War Cross. In June 1942, he was appointed to the destroyer HMS Wallace, which was involved in convoy escort duties on the east coast of Britain, as well as the Allied invasion of Sicily.

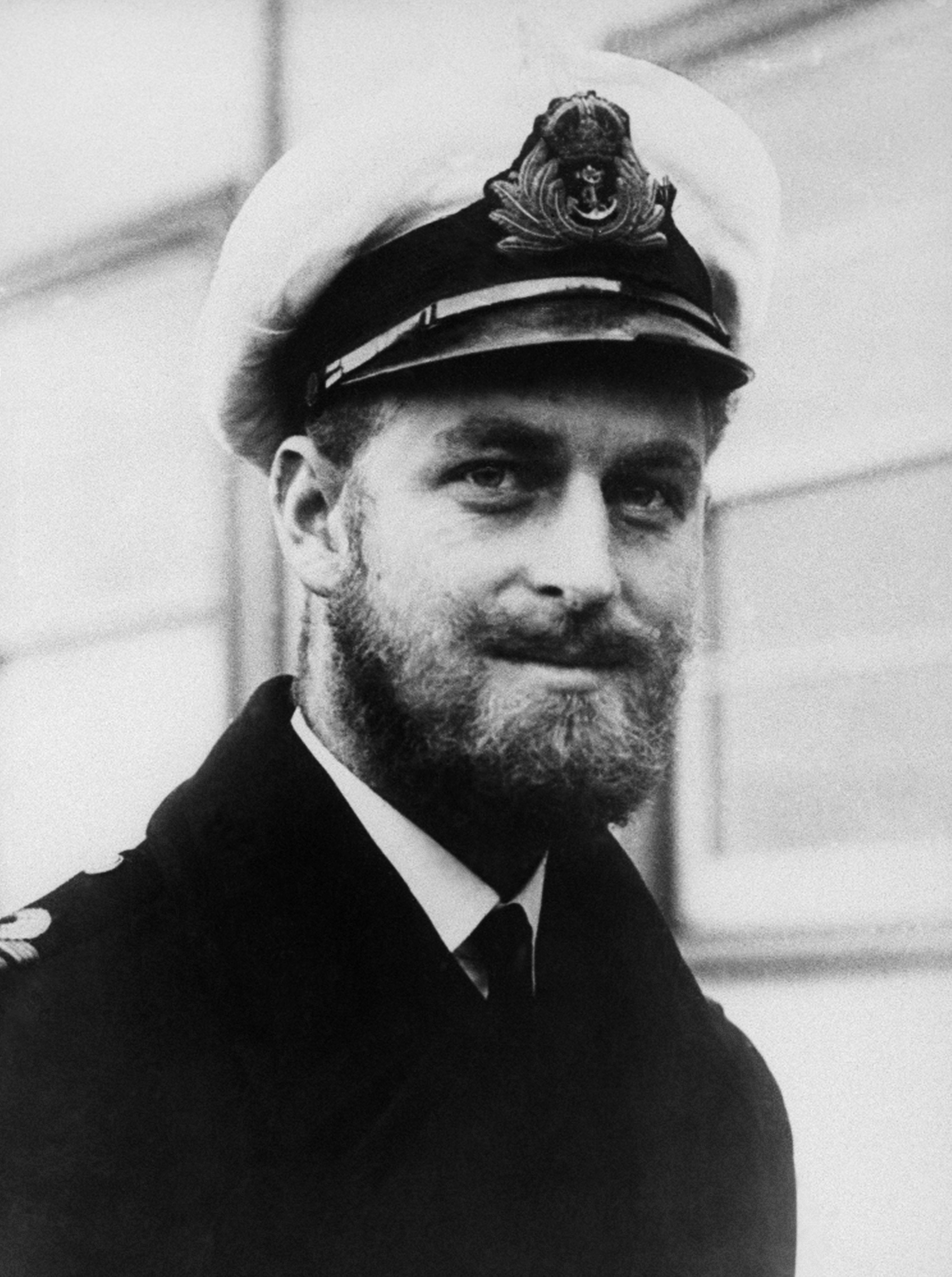
In Melbourne, 1945

Promotion to lieutenant followed on 16 July 1942. That October Philip, aged 21, became first lieutenant of HMS Wallace, one of the youngest first lieutenants in the Royal Navy. During the invasion of Sicily in July 1943, he was second-in-command of Wallace. The ship was attacked at night by German aircraft, which were expected to return to finish off the damaged vessel; it was saved by Philip's devising a plan to launch a raft with smoke floats that successfully decoyed the bombers, allowing the ship to slip away unnoticed. In 1944, he moved to the new destroyer HMS Whelp, where he saw service with the British Pacific Fleet in the 27th Destroyer Flotilla. He was present in Tokyo Bay when the Japanese Instrument of Surrender was signed. Philip returned to the United Kingdom on Whelp in January 1946 and was posted as an instructor at HMS Royal Arthur, the Petty Officers' School in Corsham, Wiltshire.

== Marriage ==
In 1939, the British King George VI and Queen Elizabeth toured the Royal Naval College, Dartmouth. During the visit, the Queen and Lord Louis Mountbatten asked his nephew Philip to escort the royal couple's daughters, 13-year-old Princess Elizabeth and 9-year-old Princess Margaret, who were Philip's third cousins through Queen Victoria of the United Kingdom and second cousins once removed through King Christian IX of Denmark. Philip and Elizabeth had first met as children in 1934 at the wedding of Elizabeth's uncle Prince George, Duke of Kent, to Philip's first cousin Princess Marina of Greece and Denmark. After their 1939 meeting, Elizabeth fell in love with Philip, and they began to exchange letters.

In the summer of 1946, Philip asked George VI for his daughter's hand in marriage. The King granted his request, provided that any formal engagement be delayed until Elizabeth's 21st birthday the following April. By March 1947, Philip had adopted the surname Mountbatten from his mother's family and had stopped using his Greek and Danish royal titles upon becoming a naturalised British subject. The engagement was announced to the public on 9 July 1947.

The engagement attracted some controversy; Philip had no financial standing, was foreign-born, and had sisters who had married German noblemen with Nazi links. Marion Crawford wrote: "Some of the King's advisors did not think him good enough for her. He was a prince without a home or kingdom. Some of the papers played long and loud tunes on the string of Philip's foreign origin." Later biographies reported that Elizabeth's mother had reservations about the union initially and teased Philip as "the Hun". In later life, however, she told the biographer Tim Heald that Philip was "an English gentleman".

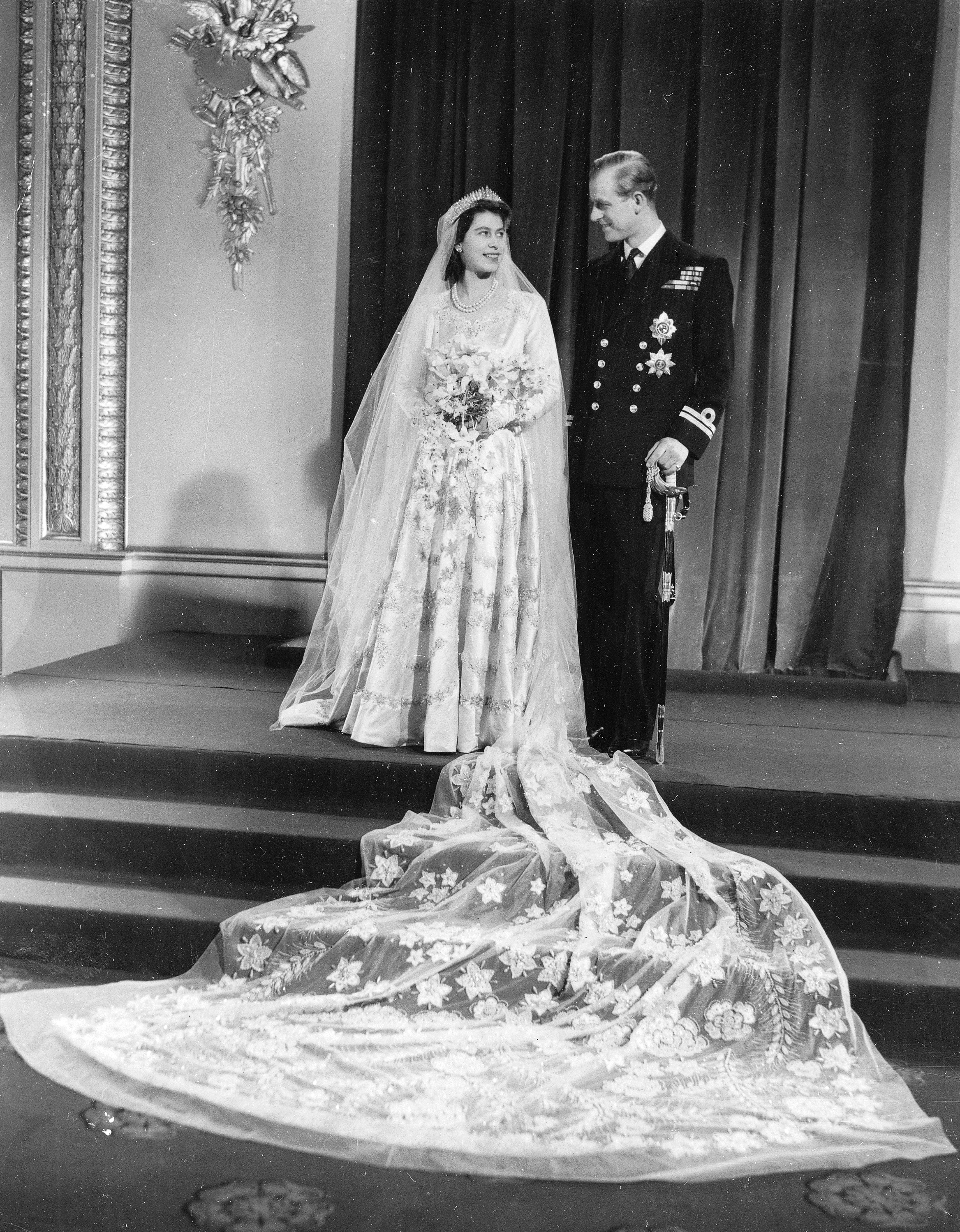
Wedding portrait of Philip and Elizabeth

Although Philip appeared "always to have regarded himself as an Anglican", and he had attended Anglican services with his classmates and relations in England and throughout his Royal Navy career, he had been baptised in the Greek Orthodox Church. The archbishop of Canterbury, Geoffrey Fisher, wanted to "regularise" Philip's position by officially receiving him into the Church of England, which he did in October 1947. The day before the wedding, the King bestowed the style of "Royal Highness" on Philip, and on the morning of the wedding, 20 November 1947, he was created Duke of Edinburgh, Earl of Merioneth, and Baron Greenwich of Greenwich in the County of London. Consequently, being already a Knight of the Garter, between 19 and 20 November 1947 he bore the unusual style Lieutenant His Royal Highness Sir Philip Mountbatten, and is so described in the letters patent of 20 November 1947. Concerned by her father's poor health, Elizabeth insisted that Philip give up smoking, which he did on their wedding day.

Philip and Elizabeth were married in a ceremony at Westminster Abbey, recorded and broadcast by BBC radio to 200 million people around the world. In post-war Britain, it was unacceptable for any of Philip's German relations, including his three surviving sisters, to be invited to the wedding. After their marriage, Philip and Elizabeth took up residence at Clarence House. Their first two children were born before Elizabeth's accession in 1952: Prince Charles in November 1948 and Princess Anne in August 1950.

Philip was introduced to the House of Lords on 21 July 1948, immediately before his uncle Louis Mountbatten, who had been created Earl Mountbatten of Burma. Philip is not recorded as having spoken in the House. He, his sons, and other hereditary peers in the royal family ceased to be members following the House of Lords Act 1999, although all peers whose titles were of the first creation were offered life peerages. The only member of the royal family to accept was Philip's former brother-in-law, Antony Armstrong-Jones, 1st Earl of Snowdon, who therefore remained in the Lords.

== Early duties ==
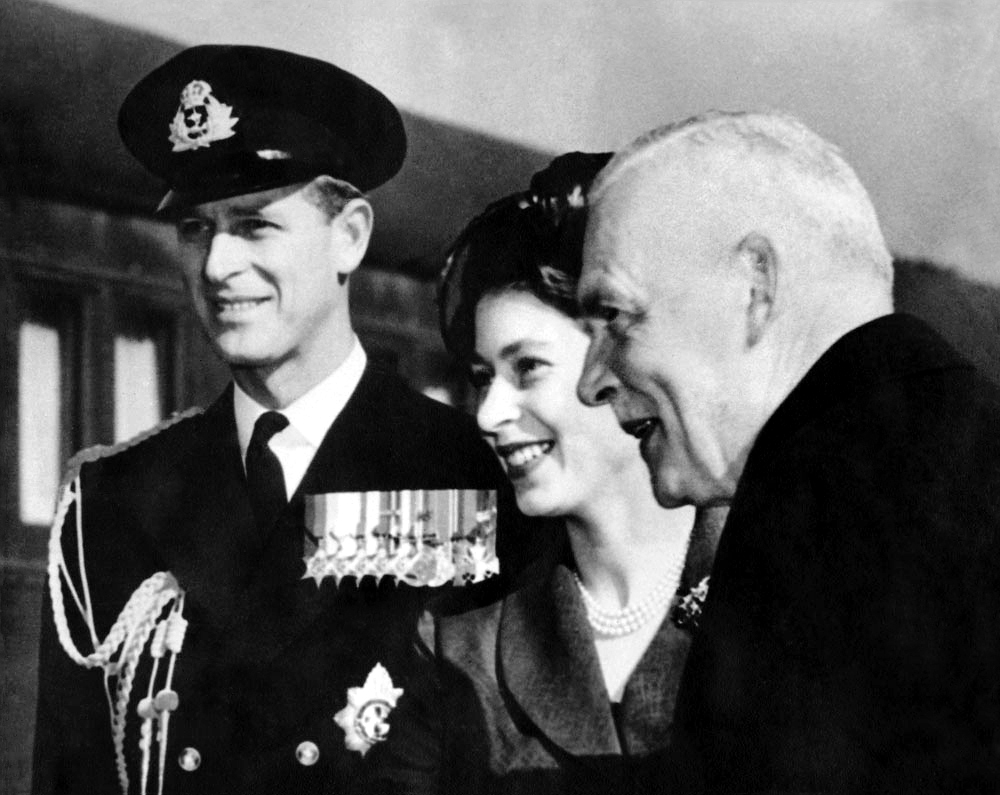
With Elizabeth on their 1951 tour of Canada, meeting Prime Minister Louis St. Laurent (right)

After their honeymoon at the Mountbatten family home, Broadlands, Philip returned to the navy, at first in a desk job at the Admiralty and later on a staff course at the Naval Staff College, Greenwich. From 1949 he was stationed in Malta (residing at Villa Guardamangia) after being posted as first lieutenant of the destroyer HMS Chequers, the lead ship of the 1st Destroyer Flotilla in the Mediterranean Fleet. He was promoted to lieutenant commander on 16 July 1950 and given command of the frigate HMS Magpie. Philip was promoted to commander on 30 June 1952, although his active naval career had ended in July 1951.

With the King in ill health, Elizabeth and Philip were both appointed to the Privy Council on 4 November 1951, after a coast-to-coast tour of Canada. At the end of January 1952, the couple set out on a tour of the Commonwealth. They were in Kenya when Elizabeth's father died on 6 February 1952, and she became queen. Philip broke the news to Elizabeth at Sagana Lodge, and the royal party immediately returned to the United Kingdom.

In December 1952, Philip was initiated into Freemasonry by the Worshipful Master of Navy Lodge No 2612, honouring a commitment he had made to George VI, who had made it clear that he expected Philip to maintain the tradition of royal patronage of Freemasonry. However, according to one journalist writing in 1983, Philip's mother-in-law and his uncle Lord Mountbatten held unfavourable views of Freemasonry; after his initiation, Philip took no further part in the organisation. Although, as the consort of the Queen, he might in time have been made Grand Master of British Freemasonry, Elizabeth's cousin Prince Edward, Duke of Kent, assumed that role in 1967. Philip's son Charles apparently never joined Freemasonry.

== Consort of the Queen ==
=== Royal house ===
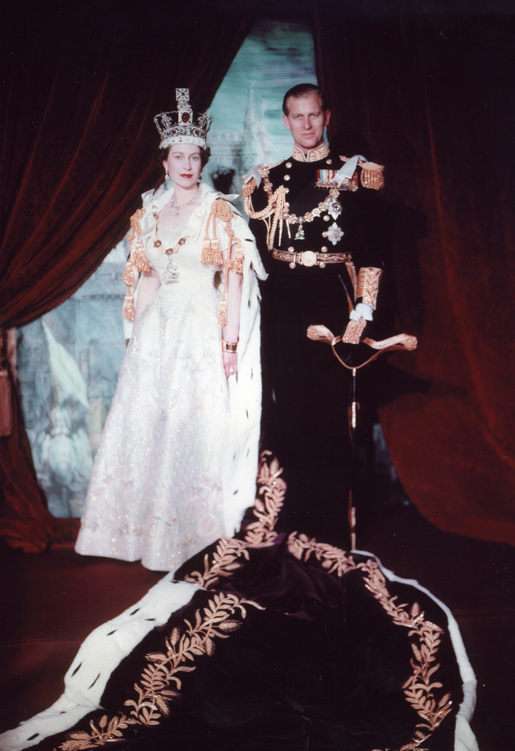
Coronation portrait of Elizabeth II with Philip, June 1953, by Cecil Beaton

Elizabeth's accession to the throne raised the question of the name of the royal house, as she would typically have taken Philip's surname upon marriage. Lord Mountbatten advocated the name "House of Mountbatten", while Philip suggested "House of Edinburgh" after his ducal title. When Elizabeth's grandmother Queen Mary heard of this, she informed Winston Churchill, who later advised Elizabeth to issue a royal proclamation declaring that the royal house was to remain known as the House of Windsor. Philip privately complained, "I am nothing but a bloody amoeba. I am the only man in the country not allowed to give his name to his own children."

In February 1960, the Queen issued an Order in Council declaring that Mountbatten-Windsor would be the surname of the couple's male-line descendants who are not styled as "Royal Highness" or titled as prince or princess. Although Elizabeth had "absolutely set her heart" on such a change and had considered it for some time, it occurred only 11 days before the birth of their third child, Prince Andrew, and only after three months of protracted correspondence between English constitutional expert Edward Iwi – who argued that, without such a change, the royal child would be born with "the Badge of Bastardy" – and Harold Macmillan, who had attempted to refute Iwi's arguments. Philip and Elizabeth's fourth child, Prince Edward, was born in March 1964.

Six months after she acceded to the throne, Elizabeth announced that Philip was to have "place, pre-eminence and precedence" next to her "on all occasions and in all meetings, except where otherwise provided by act of parliament". She also intervened to ensure that Philip would serve as regent for their son Charles in the event of her unexpected death. Parliament passed a bill to that effect in 1953. Contrary to rumours over the years, Elizabeth and Philip were said by insiders to have had a strong relationship throughout their marriage, despite the challenges of Elizabeth's reign. Elizabeth referred to Philip in a speech on the occasion of her Diamond Jubilee in 2012 as her "constant strength and guide".

Philip received a Parliamentary annuity (of £359,000 from 1990 (Note: The amount was set by the Civil List (Increase of Financial Provision) Order 1990. It was initially set at £40,000 in the Civil List Act 1952, raised to £65,000 by the Civil List Act 1972, and raised to £165,000 by the Civil List (Increase of Financial Provision) Order 1984.)) to meet official expenses in carrying out public duties. The annuity was unaffected by the reform of royal finances under the Sovereign Grant Act 2011. Any part of the allowance that was not used to meet official expenditure was liable for tax. In practice, the entire allowance was used to fund his official duties.

=== Supporting the Queen ===
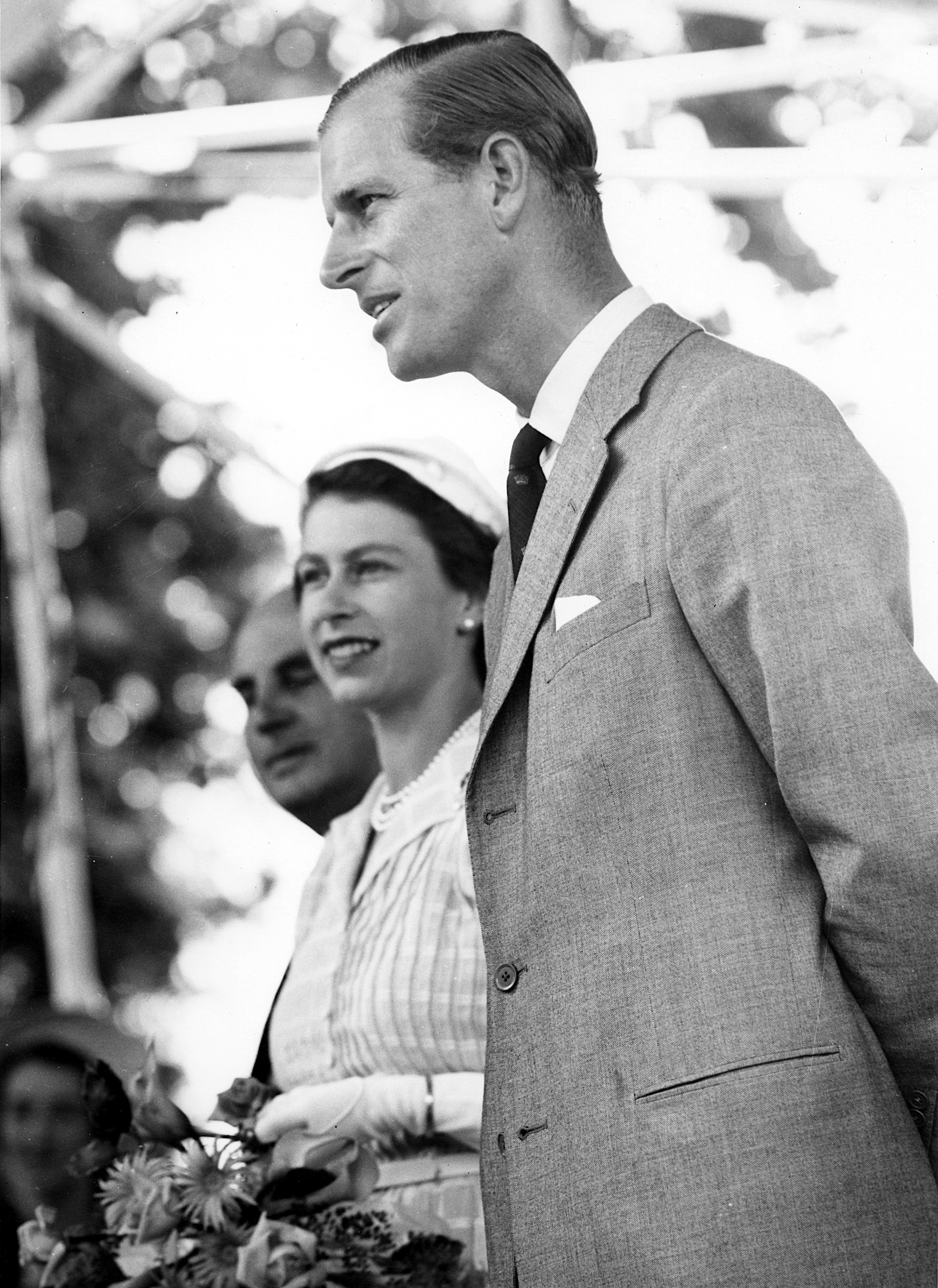
With Elizabeth in New Zealand, 1954

As consort, Philip supported his wife in her duties as sovereign, accompanying her to ceremonies such as the State Opening of Parliament in various countries, state dinners, and tours abroad. As chairman of the Coronation Commission, he became the first member of the royal family to fly in a helicopter, visiting the troops that were to take part in the ceremony. Philip was not himself crowned in the coronation service, but knelt before Elizabeth, with her hands enclosing his, and swore to be her "liege man of life and limb". For six months, spanning 1953 and 1954, they toured the Commonwealth; as was customary during previous tours, the children remained in Britain.

In the early 1950s, Philip's sister-in-law, Margaret, considered marrying a divorced older man, Peter Townsend. The press accused Philip of being hostile to the match, to which he replied: "I haven't done anything." Eventually, Margaret and Townsend parted. In 1960, Margaret married Antony Armstrong-Jones, who was created Earl of Snowdon the following year. They divorced in 1978; Margaret did not remarry.

In 1956, Philip and Kurt Hahn founded The Duke of Edinburgh's Award to give young people "a sense of responsibility to themselves and their communities". In the same year, he also established the Commonwealth Study Conferences. From 1956 to 1957, he travelled around the world aboard the newly commissioned HMY Britannia, during which he opened the 1956 Summer Olympics in Melbourne and visited the Antarctic, becoming the first royal to cross the Antarctic Circle. Elizabeth and the children remained in Britain. On the return leg of the journey, Philip's private secretary, Mike Parker, was sued for divorce by his wife. As with Townsend, the press still portrayed divorce as a scandal, and Parker eventually resigned. He later said that Philip had been very supportive and "the Queen was wonderful throughout. She regarded divorce as a sadness, not a hanging offence." In a public show of support, Elizabeth created Parker a Commander of the Royal Victorian Order.

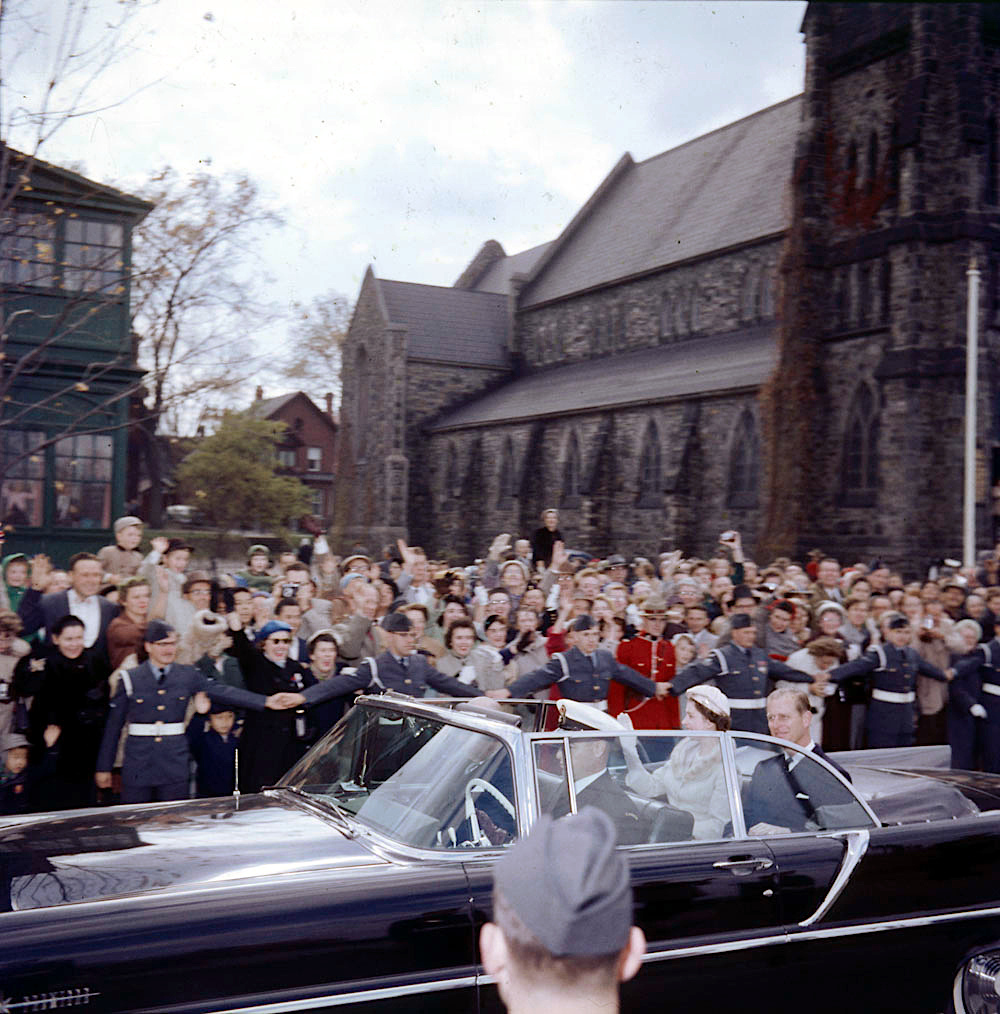
With Elizabeth in Ottawa, 1957

Further press reports claimed that the royal couple were drifting apart, which enraged Philip and dismayed Elizabeth, who issued a strongly worded denial. She granted him the style and title of a Prince of the United Kingdom by Letters Patent on 22 February 1957; it was gazetted that Philip was to be known as "His Royal Highness The Prince Philip, Duke of Edinburgh". Philip was appointed to the Queen's Privy Council for Canada on 14 October 1957, taking his Oath of Allegiance before the Queen in person at her Canadian residence, Rideau Hall. Remarks he made two years later to the Canadian Medical Association on the subject of youth and sport were taken as a suggestion that Canadian children were out of shape. This was at first considered "tactless", but Philip was later admired for his encouragement of physical fitness.

While in Canada in 1969, he spoke about his views on republicanism:

It is a complete misconception to imagine that the monarchy exists in the interests of the monarch. It doesn't. It exists in the interests of the people. If at any time any nation decides that the system is unacceptable, then it is up to them to change it.

In 1960, Philip attended the National Eisteddfod of Wales wearing a long green robe, where he was initiated as an Honorary Ovate by the Archdruid of Wales, Edgar Phillips, through his bardic name Philip Meirionnydd, reflecting his title of Earl of Merioneth. In 1961, he became the first member of the royal family to be interviewed on television, appearing on Panorama to answer questions by Richard Dimbleby about the Commonwealth Technical Training Week, an initiative of which he was patron. In 1969, he made a similar appearance on Meet the Press during a tour of North America.

When, in 1965, the prime minister of Southern Rhodesia, Ian Smith, enacted his illegal Unilateral Declaration of Independence from the United Kingdom, the British diplomat Michael Palliser suggested to Foreign Office Minister George Thomson that Elizabeth appoint Philip as governor-general of Rhodesia and have him arrive with a detachment of Coldstream Guards to dismiss Smith and the Rhodesian Front government. Palliser and Thomson decided the plan was not feasible, both because it would draw the royal family into politics and because of the risk to Philip's safety.

In October 1994, Philip became the first member of the British royal family to visit Israel. He travelled to Jerusalem to attend a ceremony at Yad Vashem honouring his mother, Princess Alice of Battenberg, who had been recognised as one of the Righteous Among the Nations for sheltering members of a Jewish family during the Nazi occupation of Greece.

=== Charities and patronages ===
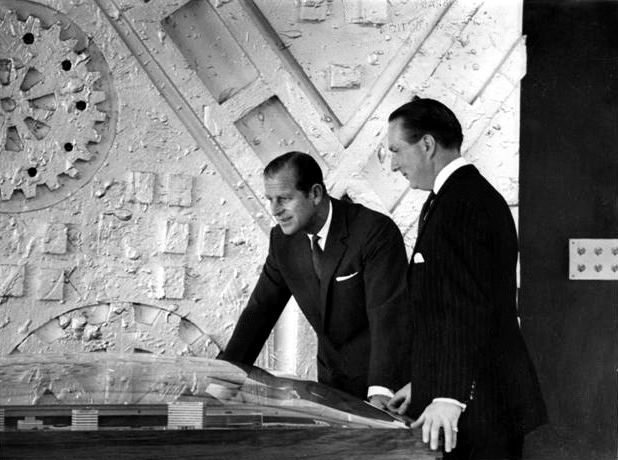
Visiting Salford University, 1967

Philip was patron of some 800 organisations, particularly focused on the environment, industry, sport, and education. His first solo engagement as Duke of Edinburgh was in March 1948, presenting prizes at the boxing finals of the London Federation of Boys' Clubs at the Royal Albert Hall. He was president of the National Playing Fields Association (now known as Fields in Trust) for 64 years, from 1947 until his grandson Prince William took over the role in 2013. He was appointed a fellow of the Royal Society in 1951. In 1952, he became patron of The Industrial Society (since renamed The Work Foundation). In the same year, following his father-in-law's death, he took over the role of the Ranger of Windsor Great Park, overseeing its protection and maintenance. From 1955 to 1957, Philip was president of The Football Association and also served two terms as president of the Marylebone Cricket Club, with his tenures beginning in 1949 and 1974, respectively. In the same decade, he became the first patron of Lord's Taverners, a youth cricket and disability sports charity, for which he organised fundraising events.

Between 1959 and 1965, Philip was president of BAFTA. He helped found the Australian Conservation Foundation in 1963 and the World Wildlife Fund in 1961, serving as the latter's UK president from 1961 to 1982, international president from 1981, and president emeritus from 1996. He was also president of the Zoological Society of London for two decades and was appointed an honorary fellow in 1977. Despite his involvement in initiatives for conserving nature, he was criticised for practices such as fox hunting, shooting of game birds, and the killing of a tiger in India in 1961. He was president of the International Equestrian Federation from 1964 to 1986. In 1980, he became world champion in four-in-hand driving with the British national team. He served as chancellor of the universities of Cambridge, Edinburgh, Salford, and Wales.

In 1965, at the suggestion of Harold Wilson, Philip became chair of a scheme established to recognise industrial innovation, which later became known as The Queen's Awards for Enterprise. In the same year, he became president of the Council of Engineering Institutions and, in that capacity, assisted with the inception of the Fellowship of Engineering (later the Royal Academy of Engineering), of which he later became the senior fellow. He also commissioned the Prince Philip Designers Prize and the Prince Philip Medal to recognise designers and engineers who made exceptional contributions. In 1970, he was involved in the founding of The Maritime Trust for restoring and preserving historic British ships. In 2017, the British Heart Foundation thanked Philip for being its patron for 55 years, during which time, in addition to organising fundraisers, he "supported the creation of nine BHF-funded centres of excellence". He was an honorary fellow of St Edmund's College, Cambridge.

=== Charles and Diana ===
At the beginning of 1981, Philip wrote to his son Charles counselling him to make up his mind to either propose to Lady Diana Spencer or to end their courtship. Charles felt pressured by his father to make a decision and did so, proposing to Diana in February. They married five months later. By 1992, the marriage had broken down. Philip and Elizabeth hosted a meeting between Charles and Diana in an attempt to effect a reconciliation, but without success. Philip wrote to Diana, expressing his disappointment at both Charles's and her extra-marital affairs and asking her to examine their behaviour from each other's point of view. She found the letters difficult but appreciated that he acted with good intent. Charles and Diana separated in 1992 and divorced in 1996.

A year after the divorce, Diana was killed in a car crash in Paris on 31 August 1997. At the time, Philip was on holiday at Balmoral with the extended royal family. In their grief, Diana's sons, Princes William and Harry, wished to attend church, so Philip and Elizabeth took them that morning. For five days, the royal couple shielded their grandsons from the intense press interest by keeping them at Balmoral, where they could grieve in private. The royal family's seclusion caused public dismay, but the mood shifted after a live broadcast made by Elizabeth on 5 September. Unsure whether they should walk behind their mother's coffin during the funeral procession, William and Harry hesitated. Philip told William, "If you don't walk, I think you'll regret it later. If I walk, will you walk with me?" On the day of the funeral, Philip, William, Harry, Charles, and Diana's brother, Earl Spencer, walked through London behind her gun carriage. Over the next few years, Mohamed Al-Fayed, whose son Dodi Fayed was also killed in the crash, claimed that Philip had ordered Diana's death and that the accident was staged. The inquest into Diana's death concluded in 2008 that there was no evidence of a conspiracy.

=== Longevity ===
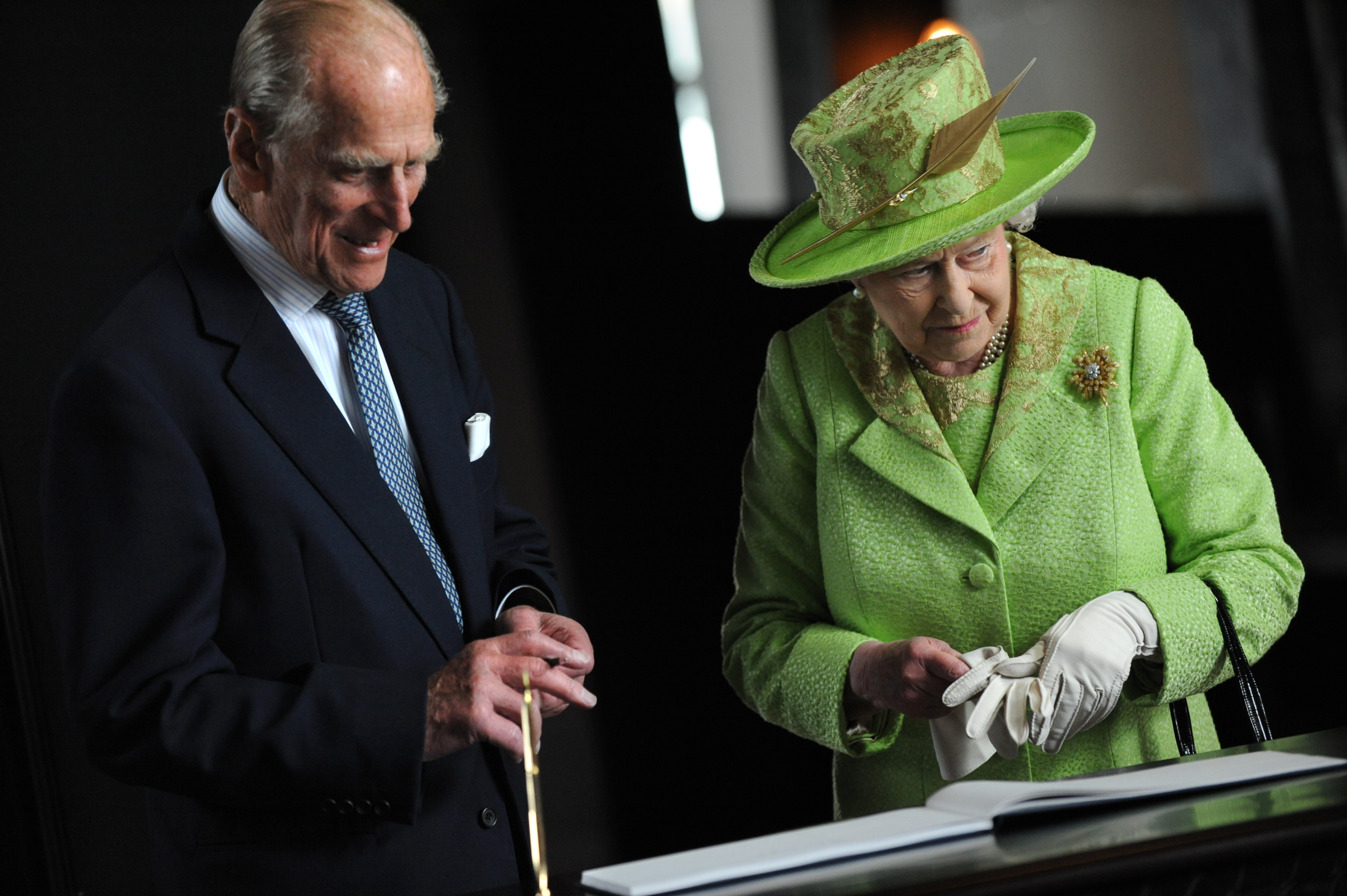
With Elizabeth during a visit to Titanic Belfast, June 2012

In April 2009, Philip became the longest-serving British royal consort, surpassing Queen Charlotte. He became the oldest-ever male British royal in February 2013, and in April 2019 he became the third-longest-lived member of the British royal family, after Princess Alice, Duchess of Gloucester, and Queen Elizabeth the Queen Mother. Personally, he was not enthused about living an extremely long life; in a 2000 interview, when he was 79, he said he could not "imagine anything worse" and had "no desire whatsoever" to become a centenarian, remarking that "bits of me are falling off already".

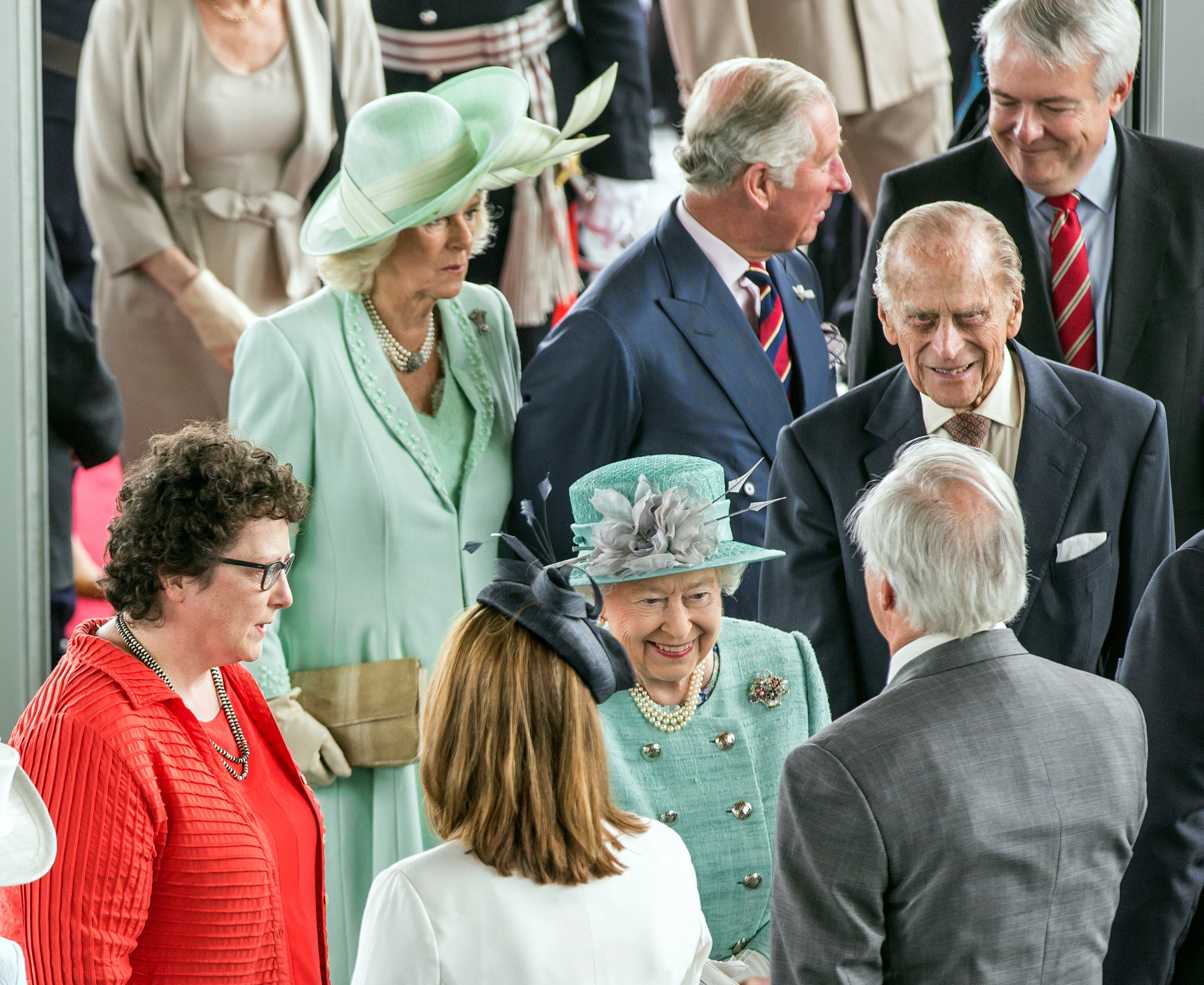
At the official opening of the Fifth Assembly of the Senedd in Cardiff, 2016. Clockwise and facing from left to right: Senedd speaker Elin Jones, Philip's daughter-in-law Camilla, his son Charles, Welsh first minister Carwyn Jones, Philip and Elizabeth

In 2008, Philip was admitted to King Edward VII's Hospital, London, for a chest infection. He walked into the hospital unaided, recovered quickly, and was discharged three days later. After the Evening Standard reported that Philip had prostate cancer, Buckingham Palace – which usually refused to comment on health rumours – denied the story, and the paper retracted it.

In June 2011, in an interview marking his 90th birthday, Philip said that he would now slow down and reduce his duties, stating that he had "done [his] bit". The Queen appointed him Lord High Admiral for his 90th birthday. While staying at Sandringham House in December 2011, Philip suffered chest pains and was taken to the cardio-thoracic unit at Papworth Hospital, Cambridgeshire, where he underwent successful coronary angioplasty and stenting. He was discharged a few days later.

In June 2012, during the celebrations marking his wife's diamond jubilee, Philip was taken from Windsor Castle to King Edward VII's Hospital suffering from a bladder infection. He was subsequently discharged. After a recurrence of infection in August 2012, while staying at Balmoral Castle, he was admitted to Aberdeen Royal Infirmary for five nights as a precaution. In June 2013, Philip was admitted to the London Clinic for an exploratory operation on his abdomen, spending 11 days in hospital. In May 2014, he appeared in public with a bandage on his right hand after a "minor procedure" at Buckingham Palace the previous day. In June 2017, Philip was taken from Windsor to London and admitted to King Edward VII's Hospital after being diagnosed with an infection. He spent two nights in hospital and was unable to attend the State Opening of Parliament, and Royal Ascot.

=== Final years and retirement ===
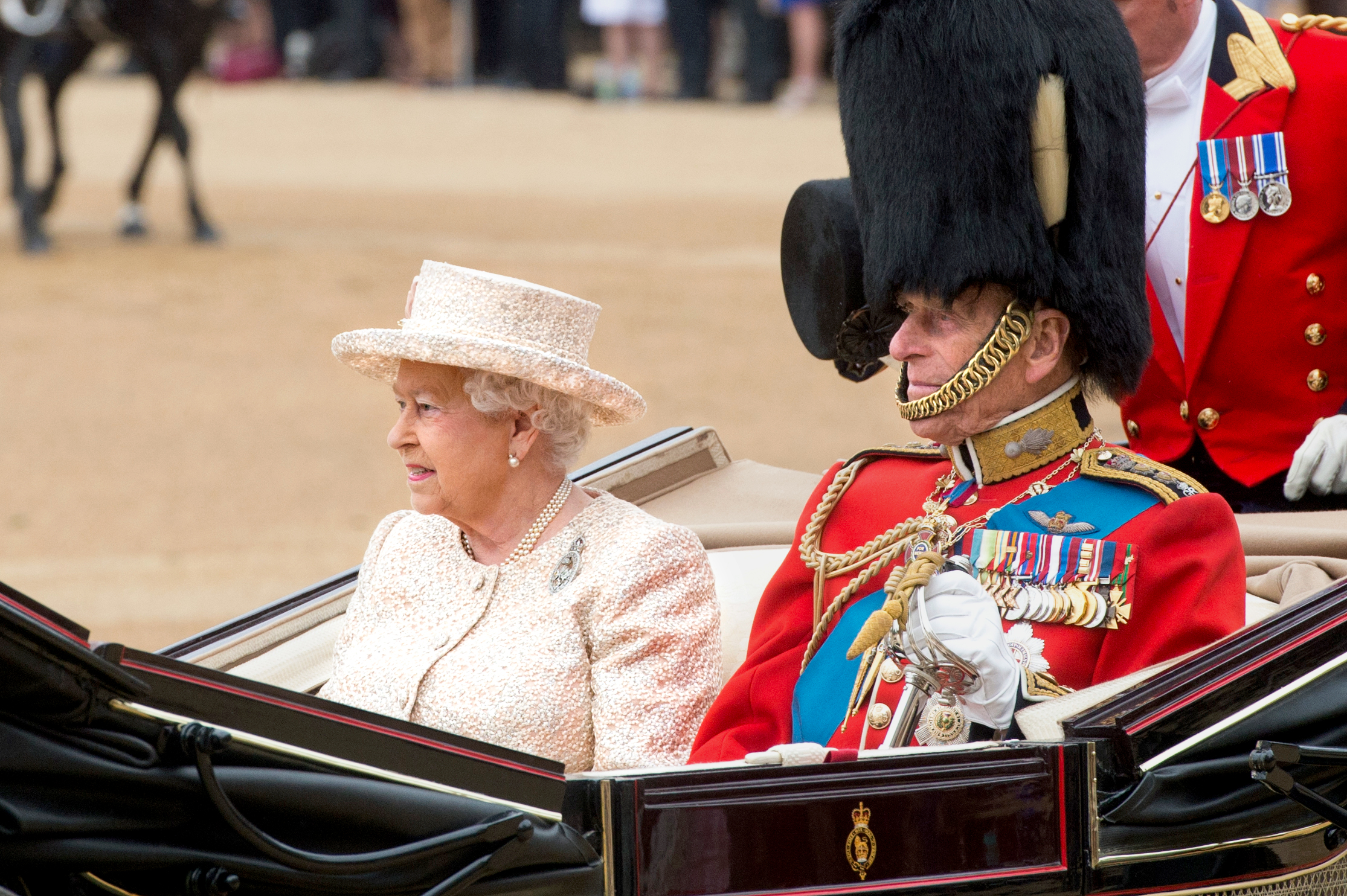
Trooping the Colour, 2015

Philip retired from royal duties on 2 August 2017, meeting Royal Marines in his final solo public engagement at the age of 96. Since 1952, he had completed 22,219 solo engagements. British prime minister Theresa May thanked him for "a remarkable lifetime of service". On 20 November 2017, he celebrated his 70th wedding anniversary with Elizabeth, making her the first British monarch to mark a platinum wedding anniversary.

In April 2018, Philip was admitted to King Edward VII's Hospital for a planned hip replacement, having missed the annual Maundy and Easter Sunday services. His daughter Anne visited him for about 50 minutes afterwards and said her father was "on good form". He was discharged the next day. In May that year, he attended the wedding of his grandson Harry and Meghan Markle and was able to walk with Elizabeth unaided. In October, he accompanied Elizabeth to the wedding of their granddaughter Princess Eugenie of York and Jack Brooksbank, with The Telegraph reporting that Philip decided whether to attend events on a "wake up and see how I feel" basis.

In January 2019, Philip was involved in a car collision as he drove onto a main road near the Sandringham Estate. An official statement said he was uninjured. An eyewitness who helped him from his car said there was "a little bit of blood". The driver and a passenger from the other car were injured and taken to hospital. Philip attended hospital the next morning as a precaution. He apologised, and three weeks later voluntarily surrendered his driving licence. In February, the Crown Prosecution Service announced that prosecuting him would not be in the public interest. He was still permitted to drive on private estates, and was seen behind the wheel in the grounds of Windsor Castle in April 2019.

In December 2019, Philip stayed at King Edward VII's Hospital and received treatment for a "pre-existing condition" in what Buckingham Palace described as a "precautionary measure". He had not been seen in public since attending Lady Gabriella Windsor's wedding in May 2019. A photograph of Philip and Elizabeth while they isolated at Windsor Castle during the COVID-19 pandemic was released ahead of his 99th birthday in June 2020. In July 2020, he stepped down as Colonel-in-Chief of The Rifles, a position he had held since 2007, and was succeeded by his daughter-in-law Camilla, Duchess of Cornwall.

In January 2021, Philip and Elizabeth were vaccinated against COVID-19 by a household doctor at Windsor Castle. In February 2021, Philip was admitted to King Edward VII's Hospital as a "precautionary measure" after feeling unwell; he was visited by his son Charles. Buckingham Palace confirmed that Philip was "responding to treatment" for an infection. In March, Philip was transferred by ambulance to St Bartholomew's Hospital to continue treatment for the infection and to undergo "testing and observation" relating to a pre-existing heart condition. He underwent a successful procedure for the heart condition and was transferred back to King Edward VII's Hospital. He was discharged a week later and returned to Windsor Castle.

== Death ==
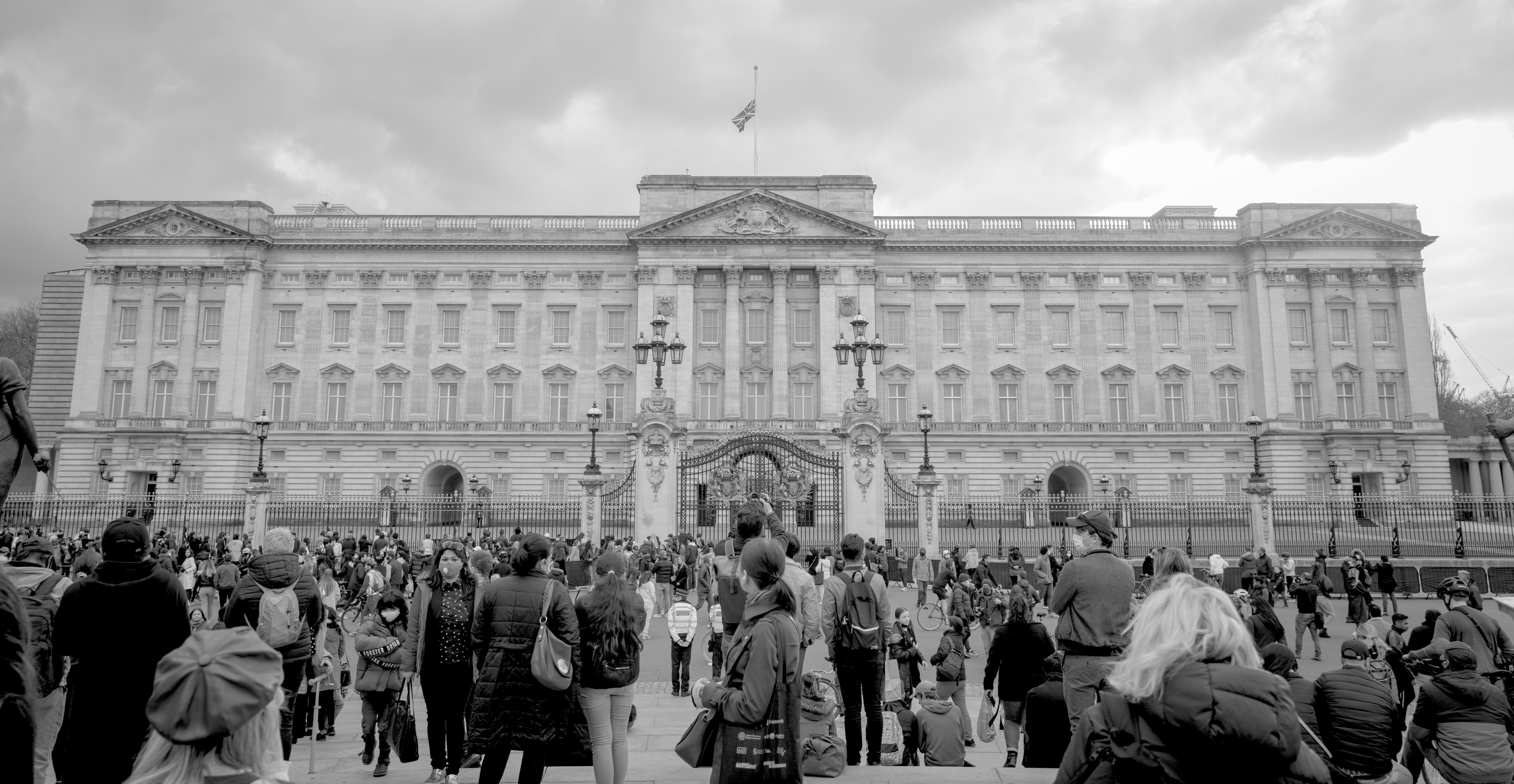
Buckingham Palace on 9 April 2021; the Union Flag is flown at half-mast as crowds gather.

Philip died of "old age" (Note: In England and Wales, "old age" may be given as a cause of death for a decedent aged 80 or older by a doctor who has "cared for the deceased over a long period" and "observed a gradual decline in [the] patient's general health", if there is no known "identifiable disease or injury that contributed to the death".) on the morning of 9 April 2021 at Windsor Castle, aged 99. According to biographer Hugo Vickers, he had been suffering from inoperable pancreatic cancer since 2013. He was the longest-serving royal consort in world history. Elizabeth was reported by her son Andrew to have said that Philip's death had "left a huge void in her life".

The palace said that Philip died peacefully, a description confirmed by his daughter‑in‑law Sophie, Countess of Wessex, who told the press it was "so gentle. It was just like somebody took him by the hand and off he went." His death triggered Operation Forth Bridge, the plan for publicly announcing his death and organising his funeral. The usual public ceremonial could not take place because COVID-19 regulations restricted the number of mourners to 30; it was later reported that Elizabeth had rejected a government offer to relax the rules. The funeral took place on 17 April 2021 at St George's Chapel, Windsor Castle, and Philip was temporarily interred alongside 25 other coffins, including that of George III, in the Royal Vault inside St George's. Representatives of countries around the world sent condolences to the royal family upon his death.

As with other senior members of the royal family, Philip's last will and testament will be sealed for at least 90 years, according to a High Court ruling that deemed it necessary to protect the Sovereign's "dignity and standing". This led to speculation that the will might contain material harmful to the reputation of the royal family. The order was made by the President of the Family Division after a private hearing in July 2021; he said that he had neither seen the will nor been informed of any of its contents. In January 2022, The Guardian challenged the judge's decision to exclude the press from the hearing, arguing that he had "erred by failing to consider any lesser interference with open justice than a private hearing", and the newspaper was granted leave to appeal. In July 2022, the Court of Appeal dismissed the newspaper's arguments, stating that the press could not have been informed of the hearing "without risking the media storm that was feared". The court added that "a perceived lack of transparency might be a matter of legitimate public debate, but the (Non-Contentious Probate Rules) allow wills and their values to be concealed from the public gaze in some cases".

A service of thanksgiving for Philip's life took place on 29 March 2022 at Westminster Abbey, attended by Elizabeth, foreign royalty, and politicians. Elizabeth died on 8 September 2022, and the couple's bodies were interred in the King George VI Memorial Chapel at St George's on the evening of 19 September after her state funeral.

== Legacy ==
=== Interests ===
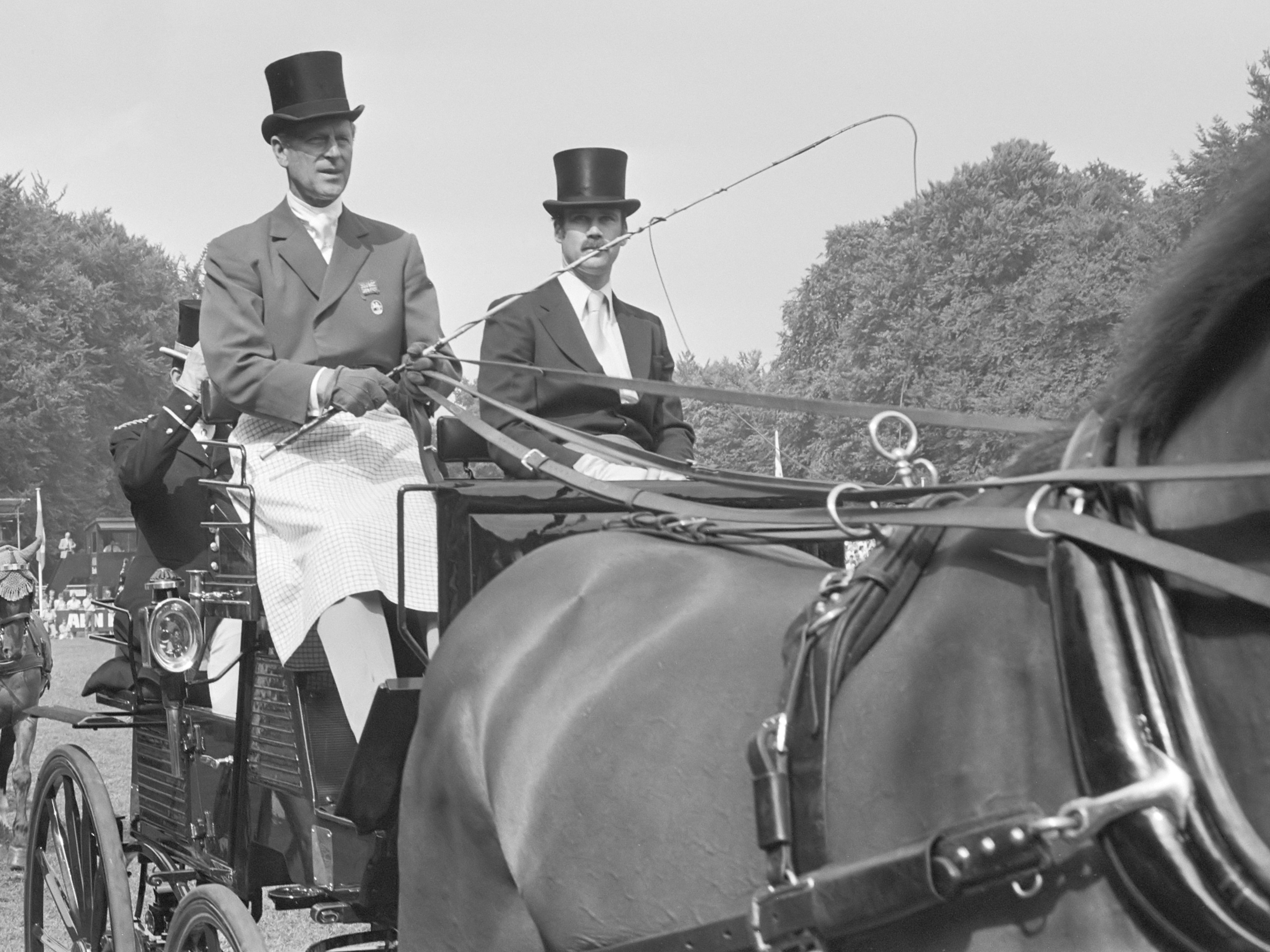
At the World Championship Coach-and-fours, 1982

Philip played polo until 1971, when he began competing in carriage driving, a sport he helped to expand; its early rule book was drafted under his supervision. He was also a keen yachtsman and struck up a friendship in 1949 with boat designer and sailing enthusiast Uffa Fox in Cowes.

Philip's first airborne flying lesson took place in 1952, and by his 70th birthday he had accrued 5,150 pilot hours. He was presented with Royal Air Force wings in 1953, helicopter wings with the Royal Navy in 1956, and his private pilot's licence in 1959. After 44 years as a pilot, he retired in August 1997 with 5,986 hours in 59 different aircraft. In April 2014, it was reported that a British Pathé newsreel had been discovered showing Philip's two‑month flying tour of South America in 1962. Sitting alongside him at the aircraft's controls was his co-pilot, Captain Peter Middleton, the grandfather of Philip's granddaughter-in-law Catherine. In 1959, Philip flew solo in a Druine Turbulent, becoming the first and, as of April 2021, the only member of the royal family to have flown a single‑seat aircraft.

Her Majesty the Queen at Breakfast painted by Philip in 1957. His biographer Robert Lacey described the painting as "a tender portrayal, impressionistic in style, with brushstrokes that are charmingly soft and fuzzy".

Philip painted with oils and collected artworks, including contemporary cartoons, which hang at Buckingham Palace, Windsor Castle, Sandringham House, and Balmoral Castle. Hugh Casson described Philip's own artwork as "exactly what you'd expect ... totally direct, no hanging about. Strong colours, vigorous brushstrokes." He was patron of the Royal Society of Arts from 1952 until 2011. He was "fascinated" by cartoons about the monarchy and the royal family, and was a patron of The Cartoon Museum.

=== Personality and image ===
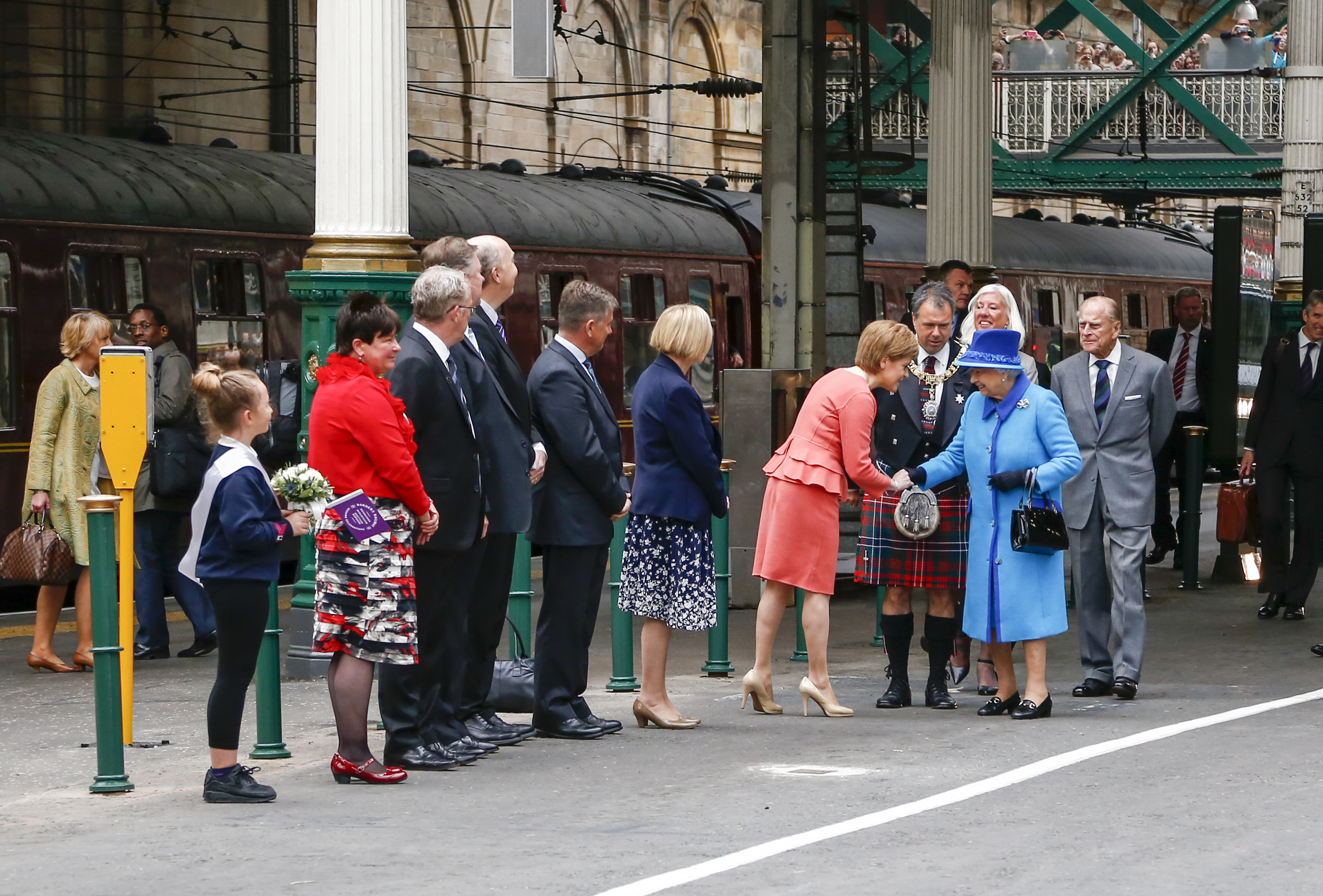
Philip typically walked a few steps behind Elizabeth in public.

Philip's down-to-earth manner was attested to by a White House butler, who recalled that, during a visit in 1976, Philip engaged him and a fellow butler in conversation and poured them drinks. (Note: The elderly retired butler quoted in the Guardian article was mistaken: the Queen and the Duke visited the White House in July 1976, during the term of President Ford, not President Carter.) As well as having a reputation for bluntness and plain speaking, Philip was noted for occasionally making observations and jokes that were construed as funny or typical for someone of his age and background by some, but as gaffes, awkward, politically incorrect, or even offensive by others. In an address to the General Dental Council in 1960, he jokingly coined a new word for his blunders: "Dontopedalogy is the science of opening your mouth and putting your foot in it, a science which I have practised for a good many years." Later in life, he suggested that his comments may have contributed to the perception that he was "a cantankerous old sod".

In a private conversation with British students from Xi'an's Northwest University during a state visit to China in 1986, Philip joked: "If you stay here much longer, you'll go slit-eyed." The British press reported the remark as indicative of racial intolerance, but the Chinese authorities were reportedly unconcerned. Chinese students studying in the UK, an official explained, were often told in jest not to stay away too long, lest they go "round-eyed". His comment did not affect Sino-British relations, but it shaped his reputation. Philip also made comments on the eating habits of Cantonese people, stating: "If it has four legs and is not a chair, has wings and is not an airplane, or swims and is not a submarine, the Cantonese will eat it." In Australia, he asked an Indigenous Australian entrepreneur: "Do you still throw spears at each other?"

In 2011, historian David Starkey described Philip as a kind of "HRH Victor Meldrew". For example, in May 1999, British newspapers accused Philip of insulting deaf children at a pop concert in Wales by saying: "No wonder you are deaf listening to this row." Philip later wrote: "The story is largely invention. It so happens that my mother was quite seriously deaf and I have been Patron of the Royal National Institute for the Deaf for ages, so it's hardly likely that I would do any such thing." When he and Elizabeth met Stephen Menary, an army cadet blinded by a Real IRA bomb, and Elizabeth asked how much sight he retained, Philip quipped: "Not a lot, judging by the tie he's wearing." Menary later said: "I think he just tries to put people at ease by trying to make a joke. I certainly didn't take any offence." Philip's comparison of prostitutes and wives was also perceived as offensive after he reportedly stated: "I don't think a prostitute is more moral than a wife, but they are doing the same thing."

=== Centenary ===
To mark the centenary of Philip's birth in June 2021, the Royal Collection Trust held an exhibition at Windsor Castle and the Palace of Holyroodhouse. Titled Prince Philip: A Celebration, it showcased around 150 personal items related to him, including his wedding card, wedding menu, midshipman's logbook from 1940 to 1941, Chair of Estate, and the coronation robes and coronet he wore at his wife's coronation in 1953. George Alexis Weymouth's portrait of Philip in the ruins of Windsor Castle after the fire of 1992 formed part of a focus on Philip's involvement in the subsequent restoration.

The Royal Horticultural Society also marked Philip's centenary by breeding a new rose in his honour, christened "The Duke of Edinburgh Rose", created by British rose breeder Harkness Roses. Elizabeth, as patron of the society, was given the deep pink commemorative rose in honour of her husband, and she remarked that "It looks lovely". A Duke of Edinburgh Rose has since been planted in the mixed rose border of Windsor Castle's East Terrace Garden. Philip played a major role in the garden's design.

In September 2021, the Royal National Lifeboat Institution honoured Philip by naming a new Shannon-class lifeboat Duke of Edinburgh. The tribute had initially been planned to mark his 100th birthday. In the same month, a documentary originally intended for his centenary was broadcast on BBC One under the title Prince Philip: The Royal Family Remembers, with contributions from his children, their spouses, and seven of his grandchildren.

=== Portrayals ===
Philip has been portrayed by several actors, including Stewart Granger (The Royal Romance of Charles and Diana, 1982), Christopher Lee (Charles & Diana: A Royal Love Story, 1982), David Threlfall (The Queen's Sister, 2005), James Cromwell (The Queen, 2006), and Finn Elliot, Matt Smith, Tobias Menzies, and Jonathan Pryce (The Crown, 2016-2023). He also appears as a fictional character in Nevil Shute's In the Wet (1952), Paul Gallico's Mrs. 'Arris Goes to Moscow (1974), Tom Clancy's Patriot Games (1987), and Sue Townsend's The Queen and I (1992).

== Books ==
Philip authored:

- Selected Speeches – 1948–55 (1957; revised paperback edition published by Nabu Press, 2011), ISBN 978-1-245-67133-0
- Selected Speeches – 1956–59 (1960)
- Birds from Britannia (1962; published in the United States as Seabirds from Southern Waters), ISBN 978-1-163-69929-4
- Wildlife Crisis with James Fisher (1970), ISBN 978-0-402-12511-2
- The Environmental Revolution: Speeches on Conservation, 1962–1977 (1978), ISBN 978-0-8464-1453-7
- Competition Carriage Driving (1982; published in France, 1984; second edition, 1984; revised edition, 1994), ISBN 978-0-85131-594-2
- A Question of Balance (1982), ISBN 978-0-85955-087-1
- Men, Machines and Sacred Cows (1984), ISBN 978-0-241-11174-1
- A Windsor Correspondence with Michael Mann (1984), ISBN 978-0-85955-108-3
- Down to Earth: Collected Writings and Speeches on Man and the Natural World 1961–87 (1988; paperback edition, 1989; Japanese edition, 1992), ISBN 978-0-8289-0711-8
- Survival or Extinction: A Christian Attitude to the Environment with Michael Mann (1989), ISBN 978-0-85955-158-8
- Driving and Judging Dressage (1996), ISBN 978-0-85131-666-6
- 30 Years On, and Off, the Box Seat (2004), ISBN 978-0-85131-898-1

Forewords to:

- Royal Australian Navy 1911–1961 Jubilee Souvenir issued by authority of the Department of the Navy, Canberra (1961)
- The Concise British Flora in Colour by William Keble Martin, Ebury Press / Michael Joseph (1965)
- Birds of Town and Village by William Donald Campbell and Basil Ede (1965)
- Kurt Hahn by Hermann Röhrs and Hilary Tunstall-Behrens (1970)
- The Doomsday Book of Animals by David Day (1981)
- Saving the Animals: The World Wildlife Fund Book of Conservation by Bernard Stonehouse (1981)
- The Art of Driving by Max Pape (1982), ISBN 978-0-85131-339-9
- Yachting and the Royal Prince Alfred Yacht Club by Graeme Norman (1988), ISBN 978-0-86777-067-4
- National Maritime Museum Guide to Maritime Britain by Keith Wheatley (2000)
- The Royal Yacht Britannia: The Official History by Richard Johnstone-Bryden, Conway Maritime Press (2003), ISBN 978-0-85177-937-9
- 1953: The Crowning Year of Sport by Jonathan Rice (2003)
- British Flags and Emblems by Graham Bartram, Tuckwell Press (2004), ISBN 978-1-86232-297-4
- Chariots of War by Robert Hobson, Ulric Publication (2004), ISBN 978-0-9541997-1-5
- RMS Queen Mary 2 Manual: An Insight into the Design, Construction and Operation of the World's Largest Ocean Liner by Stephen Payne, Haynes Publishing (2014)
- The Triumph of a Great Tradition: The Story of Cunard's 175 Years by Eric Flounders and Michael Gallagher, Lily Publications (2014), ISBN 978-1-906608-85-9

== Titles, styles, honours, and arms ==
Royal monogram

Philip held many titles throughout his life. Originally a prince of Greece and Denmark, he abandoned these titles before his marriage and was thereafter created a British duke, among other noble titles. In 1957, Elizabeth formally issued letters patent making him a British prince.

=== Honours and honorary military appointments ===
Philip received medals from Britain, France, and Greece for his service during the Second World War, as well as medals commemorating the coronations of George VI and Elizabeth II, and the silver, gold, and diamond jubilees of Elizabeth. George VI appointed him to the Order of the Garter on the eve of his wedding on 19 November 1947. Thereafter, Philip received 17 appointments and decorations within Commonwealth and 48 from foreign states. The inhabitants of several villages on the island of Tanna, Vanuatu, worship Philip as a god-like spiritual figure; they keep portraits of him and hold feasts on his birthday.

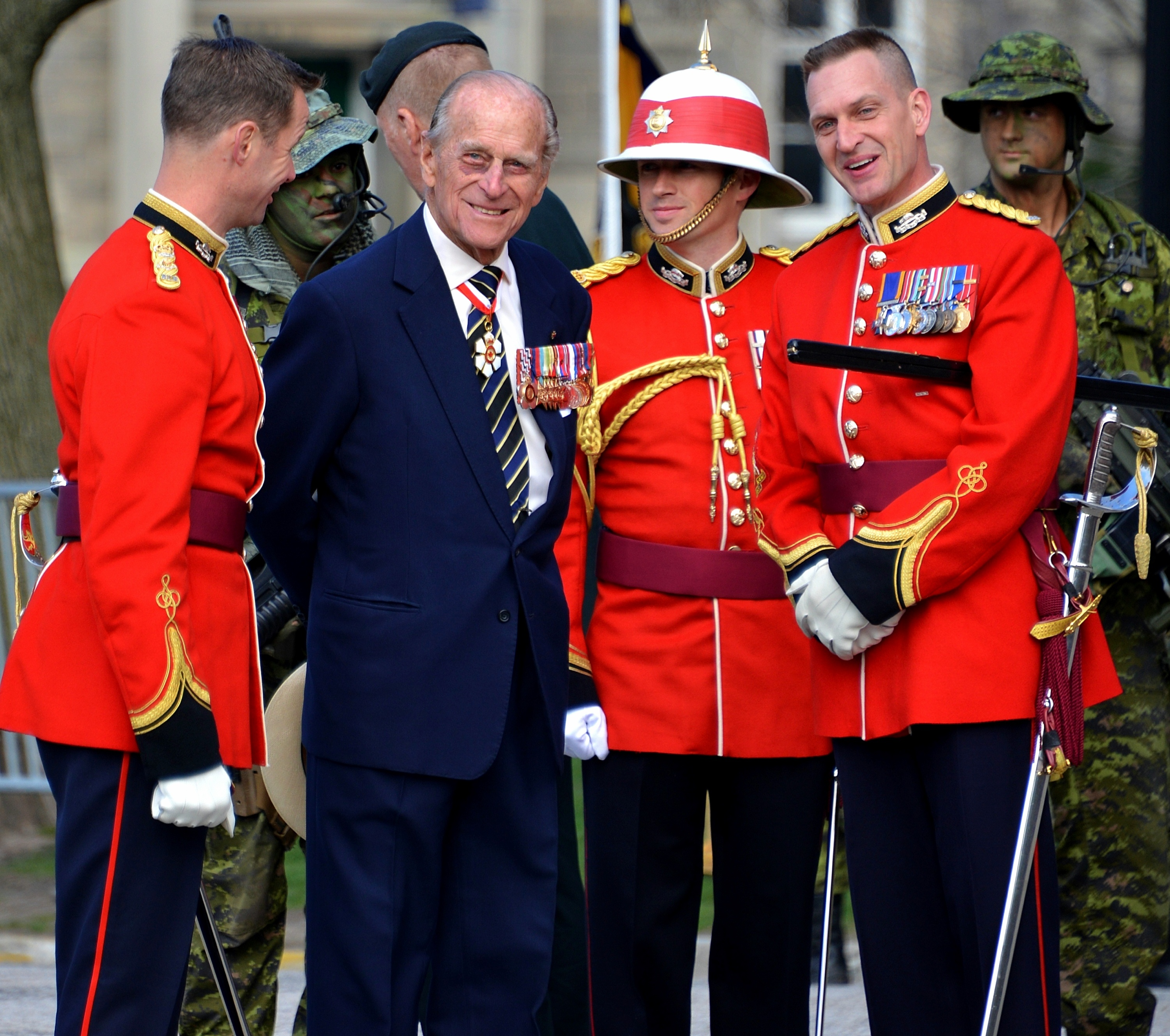
Presenting the 3rd Battalion with their regimental colours as Colonel-in-Chief of the Royal Canadian Regiment in Toronto, 2013

Upon his wife's accession to the throne in 1952, Philip was appointed Admiral of the Sea Cadet Corps, Colonel-in-Chief of the British Army Cadet Force, and Air Commodore-in-Chief of the Air Training Corps. The following year, he was appointed to the equivalent positions in Canada and made Admiral of the Fleet, Captain General Royal Marines, field marshal, and Marshal of the Royal Air Force in the United Kingdom. Subsequent military appointments were made in New Zealand and Australia. In 1975, he was appointed colonel of the Grenadier Guards, a position he handed over to his son Andrew in 2017. On 16 December 2015, he relinquished his role as Honorary Air Commodore-in-Chief and was succeeded by his granddaughter-in-law Catherine, then Duchess of Cambridge, as Honorary Air Commandant.

To mark Philip's 90th birthday, Elizabeth appointed him Lord High Admiral, as well as to the highest ranks available in all three branches of the Canadian Armed Forces. On their 70th wedding anniversary, 20 November 2017, she appointed him Knight Grand Cross of the Royal Victorian Order, making him the first British national since his uncle Lord Mountbatten to be entitled to wear the breast stars of four orders of chivalry in the United Kingdom.

=== Arms ===
Coat of arms of Prince Philip, Duke of Edinburgh
Adopted 1949 Crest A plume of ostrich feathers alternately sable and argent issuant from a ducal coronet or. Torse Mantled or and ermine. Escutcheon From 1949: Quarterly: First: Or semée of hearts gules, three lions passant in pale azure ducally crowned or (for Denmark), Second: Azure a cross argent (for Greece), Third: Argent two pallets sable (for Battenberg and Mountbatten), Fourth: Argent upon a rock proper a castle triple towered sable masoned argent windows port turret-caps and vanes gules (for Edinburgh). Supporters Dexter, a savage crowned with a chaplet of oak leaves girt about the loins with a lion skin and supporting in the dexter hand a club proper (from the royal Greek arms); Sinister, a lion queue fourché ducally crowned or and gorged with a naval coronet azure (based on Battenberg arms). Motto GOD IS MY HELP Orders The Order of the Garter ribbon HONI SOIT QUI MAL Y PENSE (Anglo-Norman for 'Shamed be he who thinks evil of it') Banner A banner of Philip's arms was used as his personal standard. Symbolism The arms of Denmark and Greece, as well as Mountbatten, represent the Duke of Edinburgh's familial lineage. The arms of the City of Edinburgh represent Philip's dukedom. The naval crown collar alludes to Philip's naval career. Previous versions Before 1947: "Coat of arms as a Greek & Danish Prince; Arms of Greece surmounted by an inescutcheon of the lesser arms of Denmark; the shield ensigned with a princely coronet of crosses pattée and fleurs-de-lis." During 1947: "Arms of Greece surmounted by an inescutcheon of the arms of Denmark; and over all in the first quarter the arms of Princess Alice, daughter of Queen Victoria, viz, the Royal Arms differenced with a label of three points argent, the middle point charged with a rose gules and each of the others with an ermine spot." From 1947 to 1949: "Arms of Greece surmounted by an inescutcheon of the arms of Denmark; and over all in the first quarter the arms of Princess Alice, daughter of Queen Victoria, viz, the Royal Arms differenced with a label of three points argent, the middle point charged with a rose gules and each of the others with an ermine spot. The shield is encircled by the Garter and ensigned with a princely coronet of crosses pattée and fleurs-de-lis, above which is placed a barred helm affronte, and thereon the crest; out of a ducal coronet or, a plume of five ostrich feathers alternately sable and argent. The supporters are, dexter, the figure of Hercules proper, and sinister, a lion queue fourché ducally crowned or, gorged with a naval coronet azure." Other versions Scottish version of Philip's arms as a Knight of the Order of the Thistle.

== Genealogy ==
Both Philip and Elizabeth were great-great-grandchildren of Queen Victoria, Elizabeth by descent from Victoria's eldest son, King Edward VII, and Philip by descent from Victoria's second daughter, Princess Alice. Both were also descended from King Christian IX of Denmark. Philip was also related to the House of Romanov through all four of his grandparents. His paternal grandmother, Olga Constantinovna of Russia, was the granddaughter of Emperor Nicholas I of Russia. His maternal grandmother, Princess Victoria of Hesse and by Rhine, was a sister of Empress Alexandra of Russia. In 1993 scientists were able to confirm the identity of the remains of several members of the Romanov family, more than seventy years after their murder in 1918, by comparing their mitochondrial DNA to living matrilineal relatives, including Philip. Philip, Alexandra, and her children were all descended from Princess Alice through a purely female line.

Relationship of Prince Philip with European royal families

Queen Victoria of the United Kingdom	Prince Albert of Saxe-Coburg and Gotha	King Christian IX of Denmark	Queen Louise of Denmark
King Edward VII of the United Kingdom	Queen Alexandra of the United Kingdom	King Frederick VIII of Denmark	King George I of Greece	Queen Olga of Greece	Prince Alexander of Hesse and by Rhine	Princess Julia of Battenberg	Grand Duchess Alice of Hesse	Grand Duke Louis IV of Hesse	Empress Maria of Russia
King George V of the United Kingdom	Queen Mary of the United Kingdom	Queen Maud of Norway	King Haakon VII of Norway	King Constantine I of Greece	Prince Nicholas of Greece and Denmark	Prince Louis of Battenberg	Princess Victoria of Hesse and by Rhine	Empress Alexandra of Russia	Emperor Nicholas II of Russia
King George VI of the United Kingdom	Queen Elizabeth the Queen Mother	Prince George, Duke of Kent	Princess Marina, Duchess of Kent	King George II of Greece	Prince Andrew of Greece and Denmark	Princess Alice of Battenberg	Queen Louise of Sweden	George Mountbatten, 2nd Marquess of Milford Haven	Louis Mountbatten, 1st Earl Mountbatten of Burma
Queen Elizabeth II of the United Kingdom	Princess Margaret, Countess of Snowdon	Margarita, Princess of Hohenlohe-Langenburg	Theodora, Margravine of Baden	Cecilie, Hereditary Grand Duchess of Hesse and by Rhine	Princess Sophie of Greece and Denmark	Prince Philip, Duke of Edinburgh

== Notes ==
British royalty
Preceded by Elizabeth Bowes-Lyon as queen consort	Consort of the British monarch 6 February 1952 – 9 April 2021	Vacant Title next held by Camilla Shand as queen consort
Peerage of the United Kingdom
New creation	Duke of Edinburgh; 1947–2021	Succeeded by The Prince of Wales
Academic offices
Preceded by The Marquess of Linlithgow	Chancellor of the University of Edinburgh; 1953–2010	Succeeded by The Princess Royal
New institution	Chancellor of the University of Salford; 1967–1991	Succeeded by The Duchess of York
Preceded by The Lord Adrian	Chancellor of the University of Cambridge; 1976–2011	Succeeded by The Lord Sainsbury of Turville
Honorary titles
Preceded by Queen Mary	Grand Master of the Order of the British Empire; 24 March 1953 – 9 April 2021	Vacant Title next held by Queen Camilla
Preceded by King George VI	Air Commodore-in-Chief of the Air Training Corps; 1953–2015	Succeeded by The Duchess of Cambridge as Air Commandant
New title	Colonel-in-Chief of The Rifles; 2007–2020	Succeeded by The Duchess of Cornwall
Military offices
Preceded by The Queen	Lord High Admiral; 10 June 2011 – 9 April 2021	Succeeded by The Queen
