= Men, Machines and Sacred Cows =

Collection of essays by Prince Philip, Duke of Edinburgh

Men, Machines and Sacred Cows is a 1984 collection of essays by Prince Philip, Duke of Edinburgh, many originally delivered as lectures. It was published by Hamish Hamilton in 1984.

Many of the essays in the book were delivered as lectures by Philip to various learned societies and professional associations of which he was an honorary member, including the British Association, Royal Aeronautical Society, the Association for Science Education and the Institute of Radio Engineers.

It was reviewed by the botanist Eric Ashby in New Scientist magazine in March 1984. Ashby felt the essays demonstrated Philip's "mastering this minor art form" of lecturing to associations, professional bodies, and institutes. Ashby highlights the first essay in the collection which is a "witty but robust defence of individuality" that rebukes those who place "political theories and economic and educational systems into a higher priority than the people these things are supposed to serve".

Jon Nordheimer, in the New York Times, wrote that the Prince "uses aplomb and humor to paint broad pictures of British politicians, ecologists and polo players, among others" and the book gave him the chance to "cast a sardonic eye on his own foibles as well as those of others". Nordheimer wrote that there had been no critical reaction to the book and felt that Philip's "...strong views and penchant for offering advice to the experts have annoyed some people, particularly those who see a contradiction in the environmentalist who hunts wildlife or the social critic who views the world from the back seat of a Rolls-Royce or astride a polo pony". One essay, "On the Abolition of Helicopters" satirically calls for the abolition of the helicopter, concluding that if abolished "then we shall all be able to hold our heads high – as we march steadily back towards the caves our ancestors so foolishly vacated such a long time ago" and that the expediency afforded by using helicopters for business executives has led to "a significant danger that they might be able to accomplish more work and they might even be able to make a bigger profit than their competitors. This is an extremely worrying situation as it implies that these excess profits are made by shamelessly exploiting the consumer".

Philip acknowledges the risks of using humour in making political points feeling that "Trying to be funny is a great deal more difficult than trying to be serious. What may strike me as a witty comment can easily turn out to be painfully tactless".

Excerpts from the book were published by The Times in February 1984.
