= Fruit beer =

Beer flavored with fruit

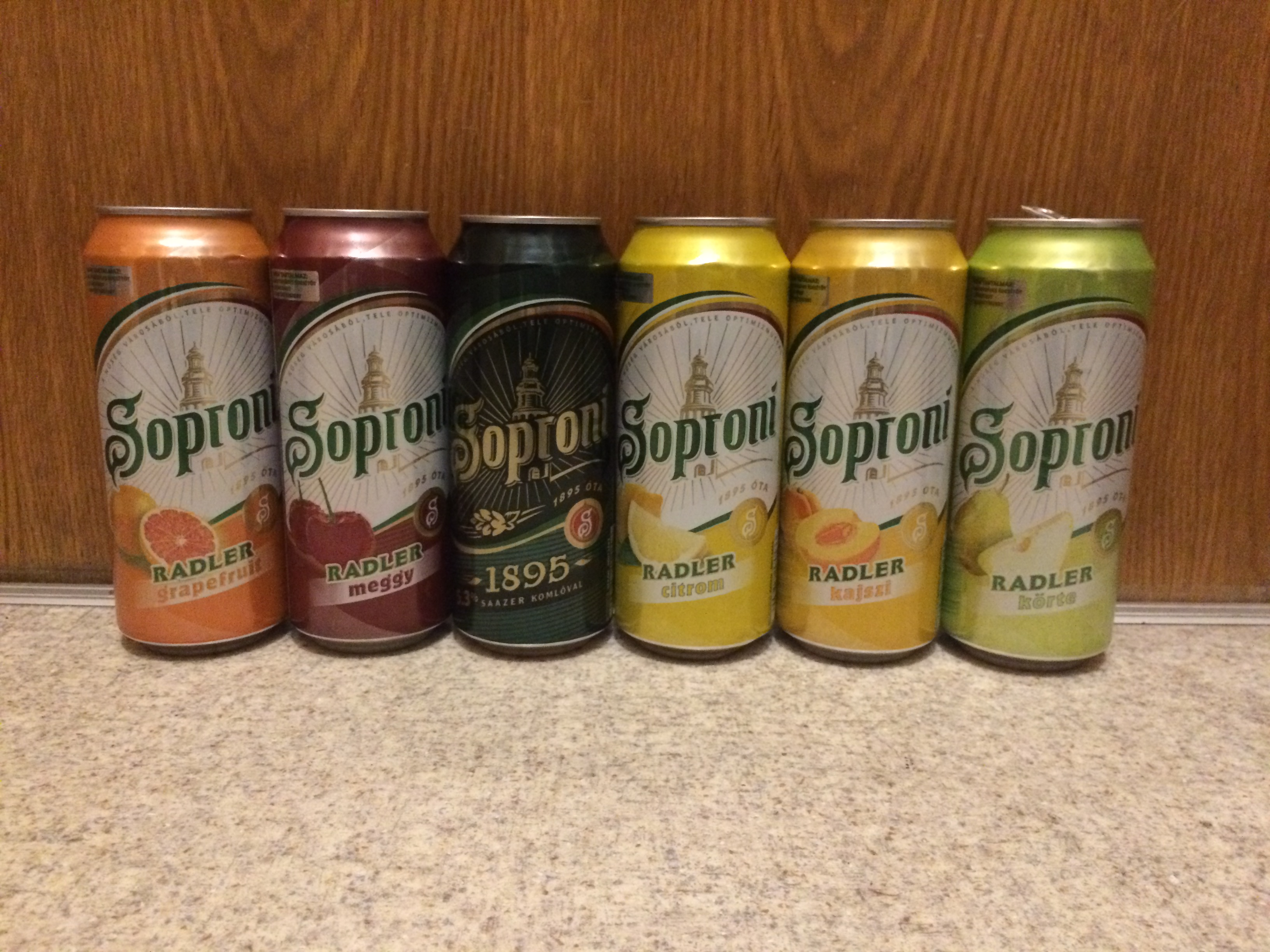
A variety of fruit beers

Fruit beer is beer made with fruit added as an adjunct or flavouring.

It can be made for example with strawberries, plums, raspberries, or cherries. It's an additive- or flavoring-containing form. Initially manufactured in Belgium, fruit beer is now available worldwide.

Lambic beers, originating in the Zenne valley in Belgium, may be refermented with cherries to make kriek, or fermented with raspberries to make framboise.

Flemish old brown beers go through a multiple stage fermentation process. After the first fermentation of the wort, sugar is added and the beer is refermented in wooden casks. Fruit beer can be made from them by using fruit instead of sugar.

Fruit beer generally has an alcohol percentage of around 4-8%, best served cold.

Elderberry juice is mentioned as an ingredient in some old porter recipes. The juice probably served as colouring agent. In England, elderberry beer (also called ebulum) was made by boiling elderberries in the first and strongest wort. The London and Country Brewer (1737) states that it has been often "preferr'd to Port-Wine, for its pleasant Taste and healthful Quality". The author of the aforesaid book also gives a recipe for blackberry ale.

The English writer John Evelyn states in his Sylva (1670) that ale and beer brewed with the ripe berries of quickbeam (mountain-ash) is an incomparable drink.

Elizabeth Moxon gives a recipe for orange ale in her 1775 edition of English Housewifery. The beverage was made by infusing sliced Seville oranges with raisins in ale for about a month.

== See also ==
- Adjuncts § Fruit or vegetable
- Kriek lambic
- Framboise
- Fruit lambic
- Banana beer
