= Old Town Hall, Pontefract =

Municipal building in Pontefract, West Yorkshire, England

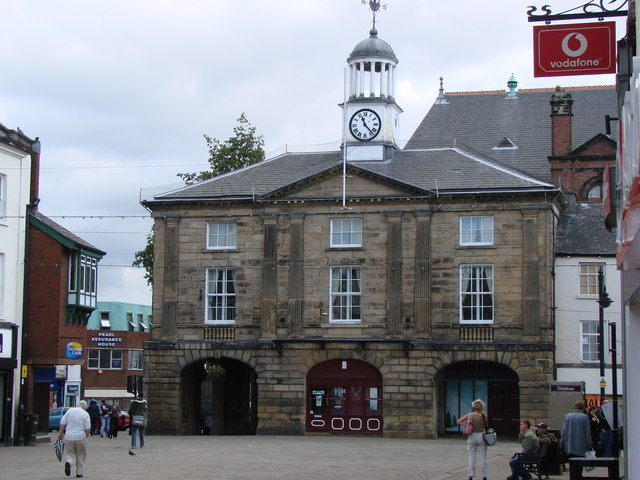
- Old Town Hall, Pontefract

- Shown in West Yorkshire
- 53.6924°N 1.3093°W
- Location: Market Place, Pontefract

History
- Built: 1785

Site notes
- Architect: Bernard Hartley I
- Architectural style: Classical style

Listed Building – Grade II*
- Designated: 15 November 1988
- Reference no.: 1299877

The Old Town Hall is a historic town hall in Market Place in Pontefract, West Yorkshire, England. It was completed in 1785 and was replaced by Pontefract Town Hall which was completed in 1882. It was designated a Grade II* listed building in 1950.

== History ==
The first building on the site was a saxon moot hall which was destroyed during the English Civil War; this was replaced by a later building in 1656 which was demolished to make way for the current structure. The current structure, now known as the "old town hall", was designed by Bernard Hartley of Pontefract in the Classical style as a municipal building with market room and gaol on the ground floor and assembly room (now known as the "Nelson Room") on the first floor; it was completed in 1785.

In 1855, Benjamin Oliveira MP, attended the town hall to donate the original plaster cast relief (i.e. the mold) from which the final bronze relief of "The Death of Nelson at Trafalgar" found on the pedestal of Nelson's Column had been made in 1849. The secret ballot was first used in the United Kingdom, and the result announced at the town hall, on 15 August 1872 to re-elect Hugh Childers as MP for Pontefract in a ministerial by-election following his appointment as Chancellor of the Duchy of Lancaster.

The assembly rooms were built to the east of the old town hall in 1882. The old Town Hall remained the meeting place of the civic leaders and magistrates until they moved into the assembly rooms in the early 20th century.

== Architectural style ==
=== Exterior ===
The building is constructed of sandstone ashlar, with a pitched Welsh-slate roof. There are three storeys with a lower two-storey gaol to the rear. The elevation facing onto the marketplace has three bays, the middle one having been altered in the twentieth century by the installation of a glass front. The first floor elevation is decorated with six large Tuscan order pilasters: the windows are twelve-pane sashes, with a wrought iron balcony in the centre, while the second floor windows have smaller six-pane windows. There is a flagpole on the front, and a small wooden central clocktower above with a lead cupola above with weathervane.

=== Interior ===
The Nelson Room, which is situated on the first floor has a large white-marble fireplace with a sleeping lion centrepiece. There is a magistrates' bench with coat of arms above. At the opposite end is the full-size plaster cast of John Edward Carew's bronze relief of The Death of Nelson. The Hartley Suite, named after the architect of the building, is located on the ground floor.

== See also ==
- Grade II* listed buildings in West Yorkshire
- Listed buildings in Pontefract
