= Listed buildings in Pontefract =

Pontefract is a town in the metropolitan borough of the City of Wakefield, West Yorkshire, England. In the town and surrounding area are 66 listed buildings that are recorded in the National Heritage List for England. Of these, one is listed at Grade I, the highest of the three grades, eight are at Grade II*, the middle grade, and the others are at Grade II, the lowest grade. Most of the listed buildings are houses and cottages, shops and offices. The other listed buildings include churches, public buildings, public houses and hotels, the remains of a former underground hermitage, the socket stone of a former wayside cross, market buildings, a former windmill, the former gateway to a military depot, a former workhouse, and two mileposts.

== Key ==
Grade	Criteria
I	Buildings of exceptional interest, sometimes considered to be internationally important
II*	Particularly important buildings of more than special interest
II	Buildings of national importance and special interest

== Buildings ==
Name and location	Photograph	Date	Notes	Grade
Stump cross 53.70543°N 1.29036°W		12th century (possible)	The socket stone of a medieval wayside cross, it is in limestone, with a rectangular plan. On the top is a large square socket and on each side are three recessed round-topped panels, forming an arcade. The cross base is enclosed by railings.	II
All Saints' Church; 53.69609°N 1.30086°W		14th century	The church was badly damaged in 1644–45 and is largely in ruins, in 1831–33 the transepts and crossing were converted into a church by R. D. Chantrell, and in 1967 G. G. Pace built a brick and concrete nave within the original nave. The church is built in sandstone with Welsh slate roofs. It has a cruciform plan, consisting of a nave with a clerestory, north and south aisles, north and south porches, north and south transepts, a chancel with an aisle, and a tower at the crossing. The tower has clock faces on the west and east fronts, and a pierced parapet with corner pinnacles, which is surmounted by an octagon with an embattled parapet and pinnacles.	II*
The Malt Shovel Public House; 53.69155°N 1.31312°W		14th century	The oldest part is the cellar, with the public house built in the late 19th century. The cellar has two bays of sexpartite vaulting, with chamfered ribs and bosses, one carved with a mask. The public house has two storeys, the ground floor is faced in glazed tiles, the upper has applied timber framing, and the roof is in Welsh slate. In the ground floor is a doorway with a fanlight, to the left is a bow window, to the right is a passageway, and the upper floor contains casement windows.	II*
The Hermitage; 53.69057°N 1.30997°W	—	1386	The hermitage consists of two chambers hewn out of sandstone, side by side, but at different levels. From the eastern chamber, a passage with twelve steps leads to a spiral staircase with 52 steps and three niches for candles, ending at a shallow basin at the level of the water table.	I
33 and 35 Market Place; 53.69127°N 1.31107°W		Late 16th or early 17th century (probable)	A pair of shops with a timber framed core, rendered on the exterior, and with a cornice and a stone slate roof. There are three storeys, and a U-shaped plan; each shop has one bay, between them is a narrow bay containing a passage entry, and at the rear are later wings. In the ground floor are 20th-century shop fronts. The middle floor contains four Doric half-columns carrying a jettied top floor. In each shop is a segmental bow window, and between them is a sash window. The top floor contains sash windows in architraves.	II
Cottages in Swales Yard; 53.69149°N 1.31350°W		16th or 17th century (probable)	A row of three or four cottages of different builds, they are timber framed and largely rendered, with roofs of Welsh slate and stone slate. There are two storeys, with the upper storey jettied, and most of the windows are sashes, some sliding.	II
2–6 Castle Chain; 53.69455°N 1.30414°W		17th century or earlier	A row of houses, later altered and extended, in rusticated sandstone, the sides and rear rendered, with tile roofs. There are two storeys and a basement, a continuous hood mould, stepped in places, and the windows are mullioned. The left section is the earliest, and contains a basket-arched doorway over which is a coat of arms, and in the roof is a dormer. To the right is a circular turret with slit windows, and to its right is the tallest section, with a corbel table, and containing another doorway with a coat of arms above. The right section is later and lower, and contains a doorway with a chamfered surround and a triangular head.	II
3–9 Cornmarket; 53.69165°N 1.31332°W		17th century (probable)	A row of three houses, later shops and offices, that were refronted in the 19th century. They are in red-brown brick, with a parapet and a Welsh slate roof. There are two storeys and attics, and eight bays. In the ground floor on the left is a passageway, and to the right are 20th-century shop fronts. The upper floor contains sash windows, some replaced by casements, some with voussoired wedge lintels, and some with quoined jambs. In the roof are four gabled dormers.	II
11–15 Cornmarket; 53.69176°N 1.31361°W		17th century or earlier	A pair of houses, later shops and offices, refronted in the 18th century, they are in rendered brick with stone dressings, an eaves band, a parapet with moulded coping, and a slate roof with a coped gable on the left. There are two storeys and six bays. In the ground floor is a passageway between 20th-century shop fronts, and the upper floor contains sash windows. At the rear the passageway has a segmental arch, No. 13 has a bowed end, and No. 15 has a semicircular-headed window.	II
Former Solicitor's Office; 53.69168°N 1.30870°W	—	17th century	A house, later used for other purposes, it was refronted in the 19th century. It is in red brick with a Welsh slate roof. There are two storeys, two bays, and a single storey bay on the left. The doorway has a fanlight, to the left is a shop window, to the right is a small window, and in the upper floor are sash windows; all the openings have segmental-arched heads. In the left bay is a sash window with a blind oculus above.	II
2 and 4 Gillygate; 53.69199°N 1.30974°W		Late 17th or early 18th century	A house, later a shop, it is rendered, and has a sill band, and a Welsh slate roof with crested ridge tiles, and coping on the right. There are three storeys and three bays. In the ground floor is a 20th-century shop front, the middle floor contains casement windows, and in the top floor are sash windows.	II
24 and 24A Market Place; 53.69152°N 1.31122°W		Early 18th century	A house, later shops, the building is in painted brick with stone dressings, rusticated quoins, a moulded and modillioned cornice and blocking course, and a slate roof. There are three storeys and five bays. The ground floor contains shop windows, and entrances with moulded architraves, rusticated surrounds, and moulded cornices on fluted brackets. In the upper floors are sash windows, with two blind windows in the top floor. All the openings have moulded architraves and sills, raised keystones, and brackets with gadrooned tops.	II
25 and 27 Market Place; 53.69143°N 1.31083°W	—	Early 18th century (probable)	A pair of houses, later shops, in rendered and painted brick with a Welsh slate roof. There are two storeys and attics, and each shop has two bays. In the ground floor are modern shop fronts. The left shop has a bay window in the middle floor, and in the attic are two gabled dormers. The upper floors of the right shop contain sash windows, a frieze, a dentilled cornice, and a parapet with a cornice, and in the attic are two flat-roofed dormers.	II
45 Ropergate; 53.68975°N 1.31371°W		Early 18th century (probable)	A stone house that was refronted in the 19th century, it has a plinth, a sill band, a moulded cornice, and a slate roof with a coped gable on the left. There are two storeys and three bays. The doorway has panelled jambs, moulded imposts, a semicircular fanlight, and a moulded cornice on tall consoles. The windows are sashes with plain lintels.	II
St Giles' Church; 53.69158°N 1.31170°W		Early 18th century	The tower was added in 1790–91, and the church was extended in 1792–94. It is built in gritstone and sandstone, and has roofs of stone slate and lead. The church consists of a nave and a chancel under one roof, with continuous north and south aisles, a sanctuary, and a west tower. The windows and doorways have round-arched heads with Gibbs surrounds, impost bands, and archivolts with keystones. The tower has three stages, with an oculus in a keyed architrave in the middle stage, and round-headed bell openings in the top stage. Above, it broaches into an octagon, with urn finials on the corners and clock faces in the north and south broaches. On top of this is a cupola with round-headed openings, a balustraded parapet, and an open crown with urn finials on the corners and the apex.	II*
Butter Cross and pump 53.69132°N 1.31162°W		1734	The market building is in stone on a shallow podium, and has a rectangular plan, a single storey, sides of one and three bays. It is rusticated in the lower part, and has a moulded cornice and a hipped stone slate roof. On the sides are three semicircular arches, each with a moulded archivolt, a raised keystone, and an impost band. The ends contain a similar arch, flanked by smaller semicircular arches with radiating voussoirs and impost blocks, and above are semicircular-headed niches with moulded sills, pilastered jambs, and keyed archivolts. Attached to the southwest of the building is a pump with lead and wooden casing.	II*
15–21 Market Place; 53.69155°N 1.31063°W	—	Early to mid 18th century	A terrace of four houses, later altered and used for other purposes, in rendered brick with stone dressings, a rusticated pilaster strip on the left, moulded sill bands, an egg and dart and moulded cornice, and a slate roof. There are three storeys and seven bays. In the ground floor are two passage entries and modern shop fronts, and the upper floors contain sash windows.	II
23 Market Place; 53.69150°N 1.31072°W		Early to mid 18th century	A house, later an office, in painted brick with stone dressings, rusticated pilaster strips, a moulded gutter, and a slate roof. There are three storeys and three bays. In the ground floor is a modern shop front, and the upper floors contain sash windows with segmental brick arches, raised double keystones and moulded sills.	II
18 and 20 Beast Fair; 53.69165°N 1.31267°W		Mid 18th century	A house, later a shop, it is in rendered brick with painted stone dressings, rusticated quoins, a moulded band, a moulded cornice, and a Welsh slate roof with a coped gable on the right. There are three storeys and three bays. In the ground floor is a late 19th-century shop front and a doorway with a fanlight on the right. In the centre is a recessed doorway flanked by canted windows with fluted pilasters and a moulded cornice. The windows have Gibbs surrounds, double keystones, and moulded sills.	II
10 Market Place; 53.69192°N 1.31049°W	—	18th century	A house, later a shop, in red brick with stuccoed stone dressings, a slate roof, and three storeys. In the ground floor is a 20th-century shop front. The upper floors contain sash windows with wedge lintels, incised voussoirs and fluted keystones; there are two in the middle floor, and one in the top floor.	II
11 Market Place; 53.69168°N 1.31036°W		Mid 18th century	A house, later an office, in painted brick, with a stepped and cogged eaves band, and a slate roof with brick copings, rendered on the right. There are three storeys and two bays. In the ground floor is a 20th-century shop front, and the upper floors contain sash windows.	II
17 Cornmarket; 53.69182°N 1.31376°W		Mid 18th century	A house, later a shop, in rendered brick on a plinth, with stone dressings, a floor band, a moulded and bracketed stone cornice, and a hipped slate roof. There are two storeys and four bays. The left bay contains a rusticated semicircular-arched passageway, with an architrave, radiating voussoirs, a pulvinated frieze, and a moulded cornice, and to the right is a 20th-century shop front. In the upper floor are sash windows, the outer ones with cornices, and the central window with an architrave and a cornice on fluted consoles. At the rear is a two-storey bow window.	II
The Horse Vaults Public House; 53.69249°N 1.30883°W		Mid 18th century	The public house is in painted brick, with chamfered rusticated quoins, a moulded cornice and blocking course, and a Welsh slate roof with coped gables. There are two storeys, and an L-shaped plan, consisting of a front range of five bays, and a lower two-storey rear wing. In the ground floor is a doorway with a Tuscan surround and a fanlight, flanked by square bay windows, all under a continuous fascia. The upper floor contains sash windows with voussoired wedge lintels and dropped fluted keystones.	II
Barclays Bank and railings 53.69176°N 1.31013°W		c. 1750–55	A house, later a bank, it is stuccoed with stone dressings, on a plinth, with a sill band, moulded cornices, and a Welsh slate roof with coped gables. There are three storeys and a basement, and four bays. The three bays on the left have a central semicircular-headed recessed arch, and above is an open pediment. In its centre is a doorway with pilasters, a rectangular fanlight, and an entablature, and this is flanked by tripartite bow windows. In the right bay is a doorway with pilasters, impost blocks, a frieze, a moulded cornice and a blocking course. The upper floors contain sash windows, the window above the main doorway with an architrave, a frieze and a pediment. In front of the basement areas are low walls and railings with alternating plain and wavy bars.	II*
6 Beast Fair; 53.69141°N 1.31225°W		Mid to late 18th century	A house, later a shop, in red-brown brick, that has a Welsh slate roof with a coped gable and shaped kneeler on the left. There are three storeys and two bays. In the ground floor is a 19th-century shop front with a doorway on the left, and a canted plate glass window on the right. In the middle floor are casement windows, the top floor contains sash windows, and all the windows have wedge lintels with voussoirs and dropped fluted keystones.	II
7 Beast Fair; 53.69109°N 1.31211°W		Late 18th century	A house, later a shop, in painted brick with stone dressings, quoins on the left, a moulded cornice, a bracketed cornice with a moulded gutter, and a Welsh slate roof. There are three storeys and three bays. In the ground floor is a modern shop front with a passageway on the right. The upper floors contain sash windows with flat arches and fluted keystones.	II
24 Front Street; 53.69203°N 1.31572°W		Late 18th century	A house, later offices, it is in painted pebbledashed brick with stone dressings, on a stone plinth, with a dentilled cornice, and a hipped Welsh slate roof. There are three storeys and five bays. In the centre is a doorway with an architrave, pilasters, a semicircular fanlight, and a moulded open pediment on fluted consoles. The windows in the lower two floors are casements, and in the upper floor they are sashes.	II
1 Market Place; 53.69186°N 1.30992°W		Late 18th century	A house on a corner site, later used for other purposes, in painted brick with stone dressings, a sill band, a moulded cornice, a blocking course, and a tile roof. There are three storeys and three bays. In the ground floor is a 20th-century shop front, and the upper floors contain sash windows with flat gauged brick arches.	II
3 Market Place; 53.69182°N 1.31001°W		Late 18th century	A house later used for other purposes, in rendered brick with painted stone dressings, a coved eaves band, a modillion cornice, a blocking course with raised panels, and a slate roof. There are three storeys and three bays. In the ground floor to the left is a round-headed doorway with a fanlight, and to the right a shop front with Tuscan pilasters, an entablature, a frieze with paterae, and a moulded cornice with a stepped blocking course. The windows in the middle floor are sashes, in the top floor they are pivoting windows, and all have architraves.	II
4 and 6 Market Place; 53.69202°N 1.31025°W		Late 18th century	A house, later shops and offices, the building is in rendered brick, with a moulded stone cornice, and a stone slate roof with a coped gable. There are three storeys and five bays. In the ground floor are 20th-century shop fronts, and the upper floors contain sash windows with projecting sills.	II
8 Market Place; 53.69196°N 1.31038°W		Late 18th century (probable)	A house, later a public house, it is in red brick with stuccoed dressings, with rusticated quoins, moulded sill bands, an eaves band, and a slate roof with a coped gable on the left. There are three storeys and four bays. The ground floor is recessed, and in the centre is a semicircular-headed doorway with a moulded architrave and a fanlight. In front of it are two columns carrying a fascia, and flanking the doorway are bow windows on brick plinths with wooden cornices. In the upper floors are sash windows in quoined surrounds with corniced keystones, those in the middle floor also with plain friezes and pediments.	II
4 and 6 Ropergate; 53.69079°N 1.31203°W		Late 18th century	A house, later two shops, in brick, No. 6 painted, with dentilled eaves, and a slate roof with coped gables. There are three storeys, No. 4 has two bays, and No. 6 has one. In the ground floor are 20th-century shop fronts, and the upper floors contain sash windows with segmental brick arches and keystones.	II
37–41 Ropergate; 53.69003°N 1.31315°W		Late 18th century	Three houses, later shops and offices, in painted brick with a Welsh slate roof, coped gables and shaped kneelers. There are three storeys and five bays. In the centre is a segmental archway with voussoirs and a fluted keystone. This is flanked by 19th-century shop fronts that have pilasters with capitals of small volutes, friezes and cornices. Above the arch is a Venetian window, and the other windows are sashes with voussoired wedge lintels.	II
3–7 Woolmarket; 53.69249°N 1.31057°W	—	Late 18th century	A pair of houses, later shops and offices, the building is in red brick with stone dressings, sill bands, a moulded eaves cornice, and a slate roof. There are three storeys, the left house has five bays, and the right house has three. In the ground floor are 20th-century shop fronts. The upper floors of the left house contain sash windows, the central window in each floor with an architrave. The right house is slightly recessed, the windows in the middle floor are casements, in the top floor they are sashes, and all have flat stone arches and incised voussoirs.	II
The Green Dragon Public House; 53.69201°N 1.31313°W		Late 18th century	The public house is in rendered brick on a plinth, with bands, a moulded cornice and blocking course, and a Welsh slate roof with coped gables. There are three storeys and five bays. The doorway has a portico with Doric columns carrying an entablature with a plain frieze, a moulded cornice and a blocking course, and is flanked by two storey-bow windows. The left bay contains a carriage entrance with a segmental arch, rusticated jambs and incised voussoirs, above which is a bow window. In the top floor are five small sash windows.	II
Red Lion Hotel; 53.69183°N 1.31064°W		1776	The hotel, which was remodelled by Robert Adam, is in red brick on a plinth, painted on the ground floor, with stone dressings, bands, a moulded cornice, and a slate roof, hipped to the right. There are three storeys, five bays, the middle bay projecting under a pediment, and a lower three-storey bay to the right. The entrance in the centre has four engaged Tuscan columns carrying an entablature with a plain frieze and a moulded cornice. The doorway has a fanlight and side lights. Above, in the middle floor, are Ionic columns with an entablature, a fluted frieze with paterae, and a dentilled cornice, and in front is a balcony. The windows are sashes. In the bay to the right is a carriage entrance with Tuscan columns and an entablature. Above is a recessed round arch containing sash windows, the window in the middle floor with a moulded architrave, and a pediment on moulded consoles.	II*
Old Town Hall; 53.69209°N 1.30985°W		1785	The former town hall is in sandstone, with sill bands, a modillion cornice, and a hipped Welsh slate roof. There are three storeys, a front of three bays, two bays on the sides, and a two-storey range at the rear. The ground floor has chamfered rustication, and contains three segmental arches on plinths, the middle bay closed, with an impost band and dropped keystones. In the upper floors are giant fluted Tuscan pilasters. The middle bay projects slightly under a pediment with a wrought iron balcony. The windows in the middle floor are sashes, those in the outer bays with baluster aprons, and in the top floor they are casements. On the roof is a wooden clock tower with a cupola, a lead-covered dome, and a weathervane.	II*
1 Beastfair; 53.69092°N 1.31186°W		Late 18th or early 19th century	A house, later a shop, on a corner site, in painted brick, with sill bands, paired gutter brackets with paterae on the ends, and a Welsh slate roof, hipped on the corner. There are three storeys, three bays on Ropergate, and one in Beast Fair. In the ground floor is a modern shop front, and the upper floors contain sash windows with wedge lintels incised to imitate voussoirs and keystones.	II
22 and 24 Beastfair; 53.69172°N 1.31273°W		Late 18th or early 19th century	Two houses, later shops, on a corner site, they are in painted brick with a Welsh slate roof, hipped on the left. There are three storeys, two bays on Beastfair, and three on Cornmarket. In the ground floor are 20th-century shop fronts. The upper floors contain a mix of sash windows and casements, with voussoired wedge lintels.	II
13 Market Place; 53.69163°N 1.31043°W		Late 18th or early 19th century	A house, later a shop and a club, it is rendered with a Welsh slate roof. There are three storeys and two bays. In the ground floor, on the left is the round-arched entrance to the club, with Doric half-columns, a frieze, a cornice, and a doorway with a fanlight, and to the right is a modern shop front. The upper floors contain casement windows that have wedge lintels with voussoirs and fluted keystones.	II
2 and 2A Ropergate; 53.69086°N 1.31193°W		Late 18th or early 19th century	A house, later two shops, in brown brick, with paired gutter brackets and a Welsh slate roof. There are three storeys and three bays. The ground floor contains 20th-century shop fronts, and in the upper floors are sash windows with voussoired wedge lintels and fluted dropped keystones.	II
49 Ropergate and railings 53.68966°N 1.31379°W		Late 18th or early 19th century	A house, later an office, in painted brick on a stone plinth, with stone dressings, a bracketed cornice, and a slate roof, coped on the left. There are two storeys on the front, three at the rear, a basement, and three bays. Steps lead up to a central doorway, with a moulded architrave, a rectangular fanlight, and a moulded cornice. The windows are sashes with flat arches and incised voussoirs. Enclosing the basement areas are dwarf stone walls with iron railings.	II
Ropergate House; 53.68982°N 1.31357°W		Late 18th or early 19th century	A house that was later extended and then used as offices, it is in brown brick on a stone plinth, with stone dressings, a moulded and modillioned cornice and pediment, and a slate roof with coped gables. There are three storeys and a basement, and eight bays. The doorcase has engaged Tuscan columns, a frieze, and a moulded pediment, and the doorway has a fanlight in an archivolt on moulded imposts. The windows are sashes with wedge lintels, incised voussoirs, and dropped fluted keystones.	II
St Joseph's Church and presbytery 53.69162°N 1.31671°W		1806	A Roman Catholic church with a presbytery and former schoolroom below, it is in rendered brick with a roof of Welsh slate and stone slate. There are two storeys and six bays, a staircase wing at the north west, and a two-storey three-bay extension at the east. In the upper floor on the south side are tall round-arched windows, with keystones. Elsewhere, are sash and casement windows, and there are two quatrefoils on the north side.	II*
Former Court House; 53.69214°N 1.31463°W		1807	The former court house is in stone, rusticated at the front, on a plinth, with a moulded cornice, a blocking course, and a hipped Welsh slate roof. There are two storeys, nine bays, the outer two bays projecting, and a lower two-storey bay on the left. In the middle three bays is a portico with four Ionic columns, and an entablature with a plain frieze, and a pediment containing the Royal coat of arms. The doorway has a fanlight, and a cornice on consoles, and the windows are sashes. At the rear the middle five bays are bowed, and these are flanked by full-height canted bay windows. Steps lead up to a central doorway with panelled jambs, a fanlight, and a cornice on consoles.	II
Dandy Mill; 53.70182°N 1.29359°W		1819	A windmill, later used for other purposes, it is in red brick, and consists of a six-storey tapering circular tower. The mill contains doorways and windows, most with segmental heads. On the west side is a window with an inscribed and dated lintel.	II
9 Market Place; 53.69171°N 1.31028°W		Early 19th century	A house, later a shop, in pebbledashed brick with stone dressings, a moulded gutter, and a slate roof. There are three storeys and three bays. In the ground floor is a modern shop front, and the upper floors contain sash windows with incised voussoirs and dropped fluted keystones.	II
Kings Croft; 53.68415°N 1.32975°W		Early 19th century (probable)	A house, later a hotel, in sandstone, with a cornice and blocking course, and a Welsh slate roof. There are two storeys and an attic, a double-depth plan, and a front of three bays. The central round-arched doorway has a fanlight and a canopy on elongated consoles, and above it is a sash window. The outer bays contain two-storey bow windows. In the right return is a canted bay window, a modillion cornice, a round-headed staircase window, and a round-headed window in the gable.	II
Transhelf House; 53.69223°N 1.31707°W	—	Early 19th century (probable)	A house in red brick on a plinth, with stone dressings, a band, and a slate roof with coped gables. There are two storeys and an attic, and a symmetrical front of three bays. The middle bay has a recessed arch containing a round-headed doorway with a moulded architrave, pilasters, a semicircular fanlight, imposts, a frieze, and a cornice on reeded consoles. The doorway is flanked by bow windows, and in the upper floor are sash windows with wedge lintels incised with voussoirs, the middle window also with a panelled apron. In the gable ends are round-headed attic windows.	II
15 Beast Fair; 53.69132°N 1.31254°W		Early to mid 19th century	A rendered house, later used for other purposes, with a cornice and a Welsh slate roof. There are three storeys and three bays. In the ground floor is a modern shop front with a passageway on the left. The upper floors contain sash windows with segmental-arched heads, architraves with scrolled bases, and tripartite keystones. The middle window in the top floor is blind.	II
15 Beast Fair (part); 53.69136°N 1.31268°W		Early to mid 19th century (probable)	A house, later a shop, in painted brick, with a cornice and a Welsh slate roof. There are two storeys and four bays. In the ground floor is a 20th-century shop front, and the upper floor contains sash windows with flat heads.	II
6 and 8 Camp Mount; 53.69245°N 1.32009°W	—	c.1850	A pair of stuccoed houses with hipped Welsh slate roofs. There are two storeys, attics and cellars, a main block of four bays, recessed wings, and single-storey kitchen wings at the rear. In the centre of the garden front are two round-arched doorways with a Tuscan surround, fanlights, archivolts and keystones, above which is a balcony with wrought iron railings. The wings have giant pilasters with acanthus-leaved capitals, and canted bay windows. The front facing the road has rusticated quoins, and openings with rusticated surrounds.	II
3 and 5 Bridge Street; 53.69239°N 1.30987°W		Mid 19th century (probable)	A pair of shops on a corner site in painted brick with Welsh slate roofs, hipped on the corner. There are two storeys, three bays on Bridge Street, four on Finkle Street, and a canted bay on the corner. In the ground floor are 20th-century shop fronts, and the upper floor contains sash windows, those on Bridge Street with segmental-arched heads.	II
15 Woolmarket; 53.69233°N 1.31008°W		Mid 19th century (or earlier)	A house, later a shop, on a corner site, it is in painted brick with a Welsh slate roof, hipped on the corner. There are two storeys, and two bays on each front. The doorway is in an angled corner, and in the ground floor are shop fronts with pilasters. The upper floor contains sash windows and one fixed window.	II
Gateway and lodges, Old Military Depot; 53.69411°N 1.31021°W		c. 1859	The gateway and lodges, later used for other purposes, are in sandstone with Welsh slate roofs. The building consists of a central arch, flanked by projecting square turrets, and attached lodges. They are canted on a corner site, and all have embattled parapets, The arch is pointed and has a Lombard frieze, the turrets contain slits, and have triple-corbelled machicolations to the parapet, and the lodges have hipped roofs.	II
Market Hall; 53.69169°N 1.31081°W		1859–60	The frontage of the market hall is in stone, with three bays, each containing a round-headed arch with a carved keystone, above which is a modillioned cornice. The middle bay is flanked by paired giant Corinthian columns on vermiculated bases and moulded plinths. Above it is a tall parapet with a moulded arch containing a coat of arms, with a bull's head keystone, over which is a modillion pediment. Above each outer bay is a balustraded parapet and a corner urn finial.	II
Mortuary chapel 53.69453°N 1.31163°W		c. 1860	The building consists of two chapels, between which are vestibules and a central archway. It is in stone with Welsh slate roofs and ridge tiles, and in Decorated style. Each chapel and each vestibule has coped gables. The archway has a pointed arch, a parapet pierced with trefoils, gargoyles, and a broach spire with vents.	II
Former Northgate Lodge Hospital; 53.69504°N 1.30966°W		1864	A workhouse, then a hospital, converted into flats in 1994, it is in orange-red brick on a stone plinth, with dressings in stone and polychromic brick, quoins treated as pilasters, impost bands, a modillion cornice, and hipped Welsh slate roofs. There are three storeys and 15 bays, the middle three and the outer bays projecting under pediments. In the centre, steps lead up to a round-arched doorway with Corinthian pilasters, roundels containing the date above, and a moulded cornice and blocking course. This is flanked by square bay windows, each containing two round-headed lights and an oculus in the tympanum. The windows have round heads and polychromatic arches, and in the central gable is a lunette. At the rear, the 6th and 10th bays project as turrets.	II
Milepost, Hardwick Road; 53.67335°N 1.30850°W		Mid to late 19th century	The milestone is on the northeast side of Hardwick Road (A639 road) and is in sandstone with cast iron overlay. It has a triangular section and a rounded top. On the top is inscribed "BARNSDALE & LEEDS ROAD" and "CARLETON", and on the sides are the distances to Doncaster, Pontefract, Boroughbridge, Wetherby, Leeds, and Aberford.	II
Milepost, Park Road; 53.69723°N 1.32249°W		Mid to late 19th century	The milestone is on the northwest side of Park Road (A639 road) and is in sandstone with cast iron overlay. It has a triangular section and a rounded top. On the top is inscribed "BARNSDALE & LEEDS ROAD" and "PONTEFRACT", and on the sides are the distances to Doncaster, Pontefract Market Cross, Boroughbridge, Wetherby, Leeds, Aberford, and Castleford.	II
Former Barracks Public House; 53.68540°N 1.32630°W		1878	Originally an armoury, guard house and store, at one time a public house, and later offices, the building is in red brick on a plinth with dressings in black brick, a cornice, an embattled parapet, and a flat stone roof. It has a square plan, with towers at the front corners and in the centre at the rear. The main part has three storeys and six bays, and the towers have four storeys. In the main part, the windows have segmental heads and metal frames. The towers have slit windows, and at the top are sunken panels, false machicolations, and a cornice, and the corners are raised.	II
Town Hall; 53.69218°N 1.30961°W		1882	The town hall, later used for other purposes, is in red brick on a plinth, with dressings in red sandstone, bands, a dentilled cornice, and a hipped Welsh slate roof. There are two storeys and four bays, the right bay recessed and lower. On the front is a round-arched portal with an archivolt and corbels, and above it is a datestone. Over this is a three-light window with a decorative surround, containing two transoms, and a Diocletian window at the top, over which is a pediment. The right bay contains a two-light window, and above it is an oculus with a pediment.	II
37 and 39 Market Place; 53.69121°N 1.31122°W		1894	A shop in beige terracotta, with a Welsh slate roof, three storeys and an attic, and four bays. The left bay is narrow, and contains an arched passage entrance, above which are transomed windows, under a cornice and a cusped parapet. In the centre of the other bays is a round-arched portal, above which is a canted bay window in each upper floor, and an attic window with a pediment. The flanking bays contain shop windows in the ground floor, basket-arched windows in the middle floor, and two-light windows in the top floor. Over this is a frieze containing lettered panels, a cornice with an egg and dart motif, and a panelled parapet with pierced panels and ball and urn finials.	II
Queen's Hotel; 53.69280°N 1.31928°W		1898–1901	The hotel is in red brick on a plinth, with yellow terracotta dressings, and Westmorland slate roofs. There are three storeys, a cellar and attics, and a front of nine bays. The end bays project as canted turrets with spirelets. The centre bay also projects, it is canted, and has a Dutch gable, behind which is a pyramidal roof with cresting. The windows and doorways in the ground floor have round-arched heads with voussoirs and keystones. In the middle floor are cross windows, the top floor contains paired round-arched sash windows, and there are two dormers.	II
Pontefract Museum; 53.69206°N 1.31203°W		1904	Originally a Carnegie library, the museum is in red brick with cream terracotta dressings and a Welsh slate roof, and is in Art Nouveau style. There are two storeys and three bays, the outer bays projecting as gabled wings with corner pilasters. In the centre is a gabled porch with a round-arched opening, voussoirs, a keystone and a hood mould. To the sides and above are casement windows. The wings contain Venetian windows with voussoirs, keystones and hood moulds; the right wing is larger, and the window is divided horizontally. In the gable of the left wing is an inscribed plaque.	II
Holy Family Church; 53.68495°N 1.29944°W		1961–64	The church was designed by Derek Walker, and is in ivory-coloured brick and concrete, and most of the roofs are flat. There is a tall rectangular central hall forming a nave and a sanctuary, the nave with a clerestory, and there is a lantern over the altar. On the sides are ranges for a Lady Chapel, confessionals, and a sacristy.	II
