= St Giles' Church, Pontefract =

St. Giles Church
- Church of Saint Giles
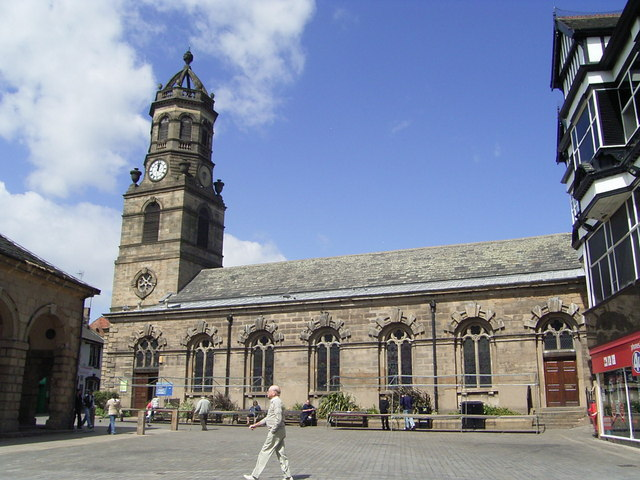
- St. Giles Church
- 53°41′30″N 1°18′42″W
- OS grid reference: SE 45550 21898
- Location: Market Place, Pontefract, West Yorkshire
- Country: England
- Denomination: Anglican
- Website: https://www.cofe-pontefract.co.uk/st-giles/

History
- Status: Parish church

Architecture
- Completed: early 18th century

Administration
- Province: York
- Diocese: Leeds
- Archdeaconry: Pontefract
- Deanery: Pontefract
- Benefice: Benefice of Pontefract
- Parish: Pontefract

Clergy
- Bishop(s): Rt. Rev. Malcolm Chamberlain, Bishop of Wakefield
- Abbot: Karen Glynn Barbara Sessford; Bruce Dalgleish Bridget Sowerby
- Vicar: The Rev'd Ian Bullock

The Church of St. Giles' in Pontefract, West Yorkshire, England is an active Anglican parish church in the archdeaconry of Leeds and the Diocese of Leeds. The church is Grade II* listed. St Giles is one of two Anglican churches in the town centre; the other being All Saints' which united into one benefice in June 2019. The current priest is Ian Bullock.

== History ==
The church was rebuilt in the early 18th century; though additions have since been added later in the 18th century. The building was Grade II* listed on 29 July 1950.

== Architectural style ==
=== Exterior ===
The church is built of Ashlar gritstone and sandstone with pitches slate and lead roofs. The church has a west tower with nave and chancel under a continuous roof. There are seven bays of round-arched windows with three-light windows. There is a pedimented sundial above the panelled door. The octagonal bell tower was rebuilt in the 1786 and is of three stages and has a south doorway and clock faces to the south and north. It was designed by Thomas Atkinson, who worked for John Carr of York.

=== Interior ===
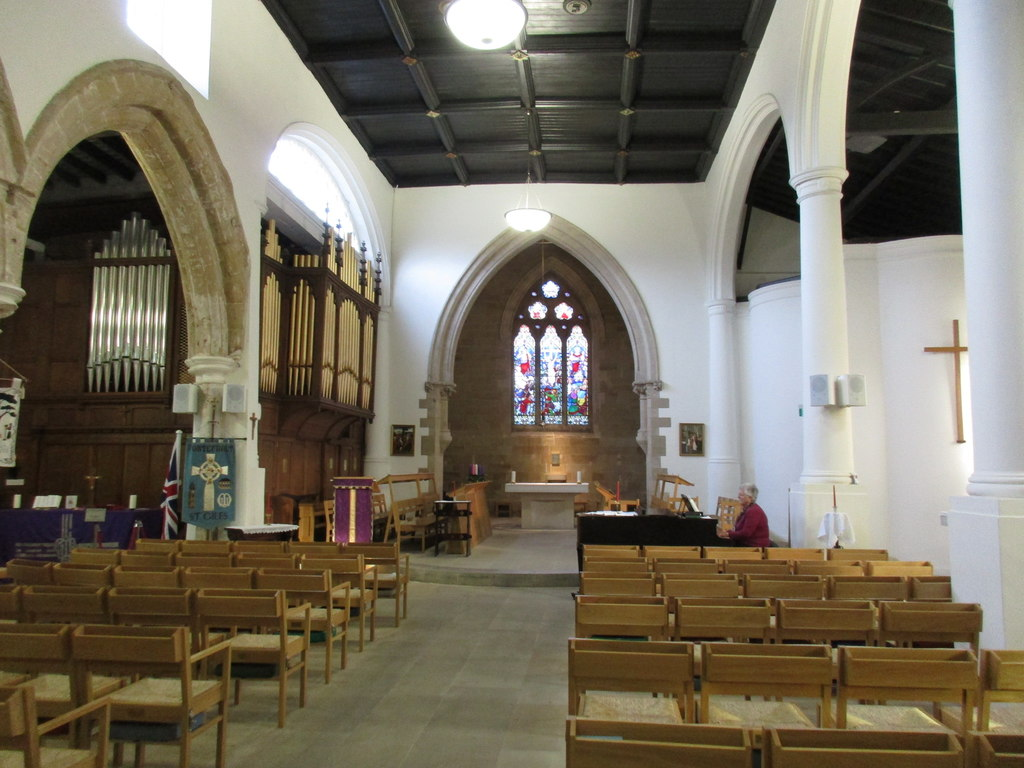
Interior of St. Giles'

The entrance from the west tower has a round-arched doorway leading into a vestibule with two flights of stairs. A pointed-arched doorway separated the vestibule from the nave and lesser doors lead to the north and south aisles. The nave has a six-bayed south arcade with Doric columns decorated with lion masks. There is a pointed arch in front of the sanctuary with a stone rederos and the east window designed by C. E. Kempe installed in 1879. It depicts the Crucifixion, the Resurrection and the Assention. The west wall is decorated with the coat of arms of George I of Great Britain.

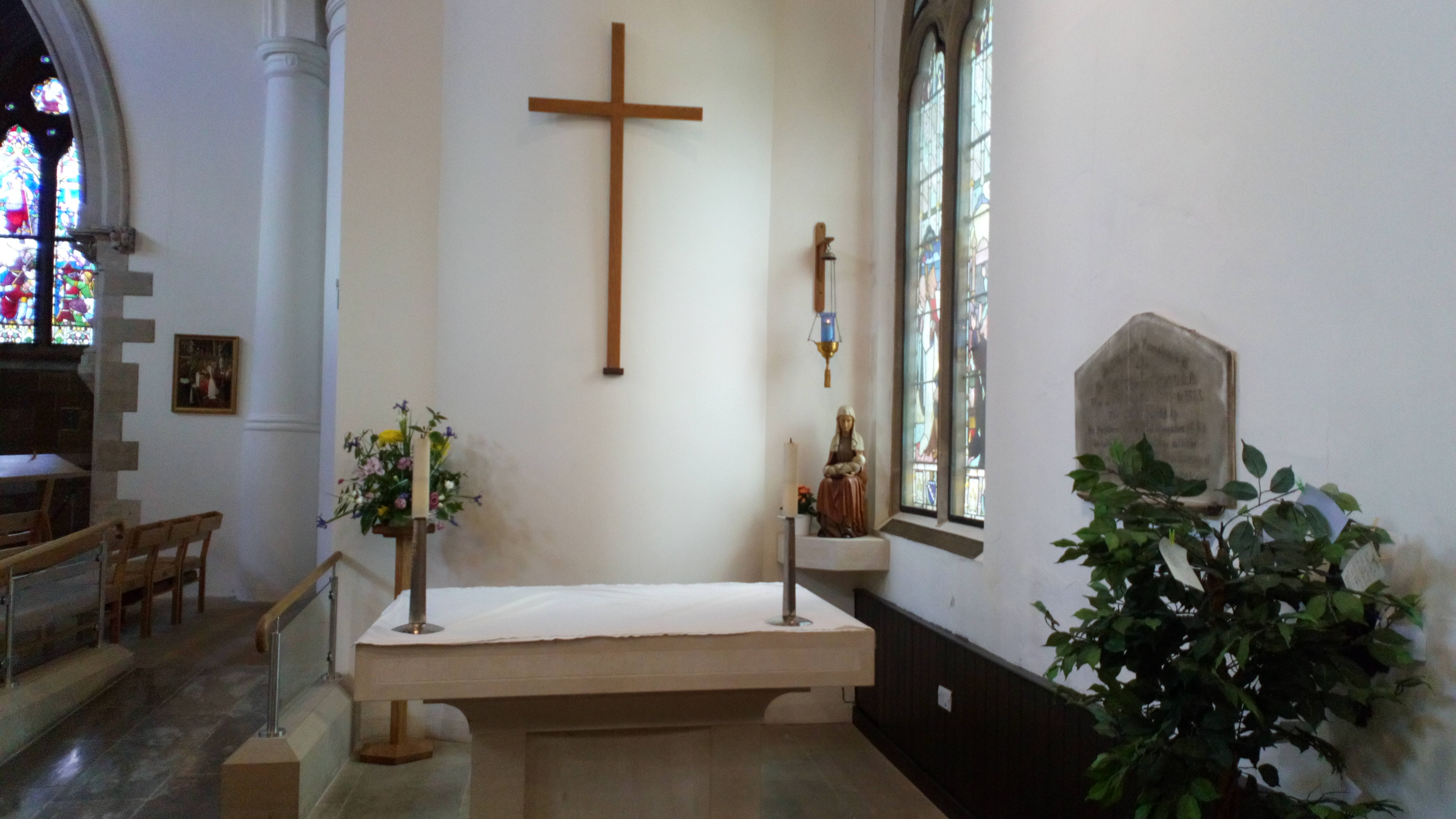
2nd Altar in St Giles' Church

== Organ ==
In 1792, the first organ was installed in the West Gallery. The current organ was installed in 1894 by JJ Binns of Leeds. It was later refurbished in 1954 and then completely rebuilt in 2003.

== See also ==
- Grade II* listed buildings in West Yorkshire
- Listed buildings in Pontefract
