= Elizabeth Moxon =

Elizabeth Moxon (fl. 1740–1754) was an English writer known for her influential cookery book: English Housewifry. She has been called one of "the female pioneers of English culinary writing".

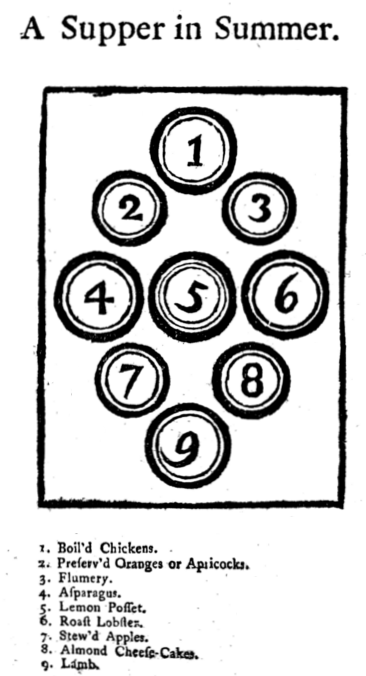
How to lay the table with a summer supper of nine dishes, sweet and savoury, 1764.

Her book was presented as practical help for "Mistresses of Families, higher and lower Women servants" based on Moxon's thirty years of "practice and experience". Along with the numerous recipes for "soops, made-dishes, pastes, pickles, cakes, creams, jellies, made-wines, &c" she offered month-by-month menu plans for lunch, supper etc. with diagrams and instructions on how to set out a variety of dishes on the table, in the style of the 18th century.

English Housewifry was published in Leeds in 1741 by James Lister, owner of the Leeds Mercury newspaper. It sold well, and from the second edition in 1743 it was marketed in London as well as Yorkshire, and was probably the first cookery book with provincial origins to make the move to the capital. In 1758 the eighth edition appeared, with extra recipes collected from "gentlewomen in the neighbourhood". By this time it is believed the rights belonged to Griffith Wright whose family went on reprinting the book until 1790. A sixteenth edition was printed in London in 1808.

Customers of earlier editions were told they could buy their copy from the author in Pontefract. Her residence there in the 1740s and her long experience of housewifery are almost all that is known about Moxon's life.

== Selected works ==
- Elizabeth Moxon, English housewifry. Exemplified in above four hundred receits, never before printed; giving directions in most parts of cookery; and how to prepare various sorts of soops, made-dishes, pasts, pickles, cakes, creams, jellies, made-wines, &c. With sculptures for the orderly placing the dishes, and courses; and also bills of fare, for every month in the year.... Leeds: printed by J. Lister, and sold by J. Swale, J. Ogle, and S. Howgate, at Leeds; J. Lord at Wakefield; and the author at Pontefract, c1741
- Elizabeth Moxon, English housewifery: Exemplified in above four hundred and fifty receipts, giving directions in most parts of cookery ... With elegant cuts for the orderly placing the dishes and courses; also bills of fare for every month in the year; and an alphabetical index to the whole ... With an appendix, containing upwards of eighty receipts, of the most valuable kind. To this edition is now added, an introduction, giving an account of the times when river fish are in season; and a table, shewing at one view the proper seasons for sea fish. London: printed for J. Brambles, A. Meggitt and J. Waters by H. Mozley, 1808.

== Legacy ==
A blue plaque for Elizabeth Moxon was unveiled at Pontefract Town Hall in 2019 as part of the Forgotten Women of Wakefield project and will be hung at her former home on Finkle Street.
