= The Liquorice Bush =

Public house in West Yorkshire, England

Liquorice Bush
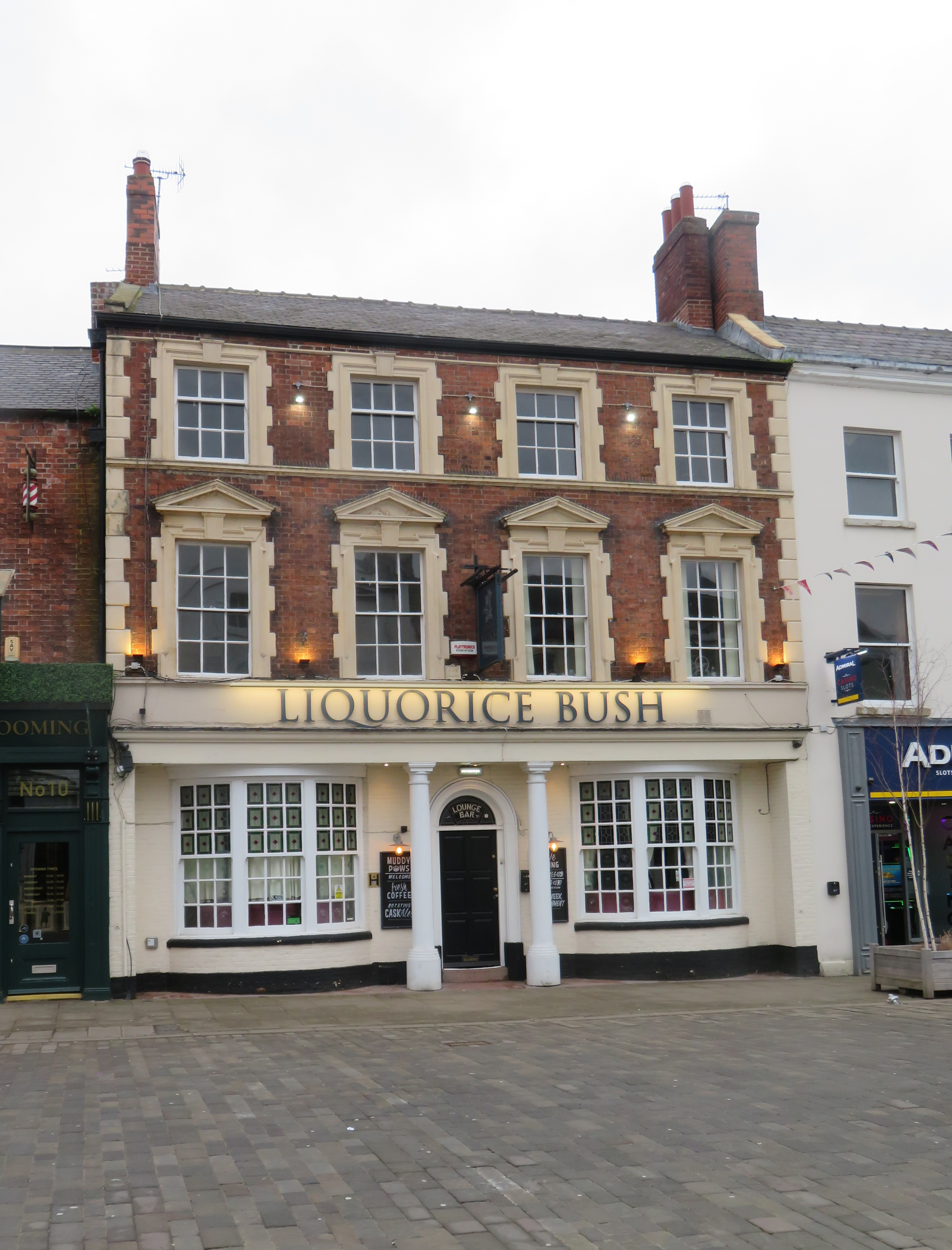
- The Liquorice Bush, Market Place
- Interactive map of the Liquorice Bush area
- Former names: The Tankard Inn

General information
- Status: Open
- Location: West Yorkshire, 8 Market Place, Pontefract, England
- Coordinates: 53.6919°N 1.3102°W
- Estimated completion: c. late 18th century

Other information
- Public transit access: Pontefract Baghill (nearest station)

The Liquorice Bush is a grade II listed public house in Pontefract, West Yorkshire, England. It is believed that the pub is the only one in Great Britain with this name.

== History ==
The pub was built in the late 18th century as a house but was converted into a pub in the middle of the 19th century.

The pub is located on Market Place in Pontefract town centre which is part of a conservation area, and is closest to Pontefract Baghill railway station. The building was grade II listed in 1975 as the Tankard Inn, and it is thought that the name of the venue changed during a renovation in the late 1970s or early 1980s. Between 2011 and 2018, it was one of many buildings in the conservation area that the council spent money on to improve and enhance the area and attract new business. An application to renovate the pub was submitted in August 2025 and the planning documents Wakefield Council described the building as having a "high architectural value." It is believed that the name Liquorice Bush is unique among British pub-names.

The pub takes its name from Pontefract's association with the growing and production of liquorice. The pub featured on the BBC's One Show in 2008 alongside other areas and themes in Pontefract on the subject of liquorice.

== See also ==
- Listed buildings in Pontefract
