= Robert Hanby =

English footballer

Personal information
- Full name: Robert James Hanby
- Date of birth: 24 December 1974 (age 51)
- Place of birth: Pontefract, England
- Position: Defender

Senior career*
Years	Team	Apps	(Gls)
1994–1996	Barnsley	0	(0)
1996–1997	Scarborough	4	(0)
- * Club domestic league appearances and goals

Robert James Hanby (born 24 December 1974) is an English former footballer who played in the Football League for Scarborough.
