= Pontefract Market Hall =

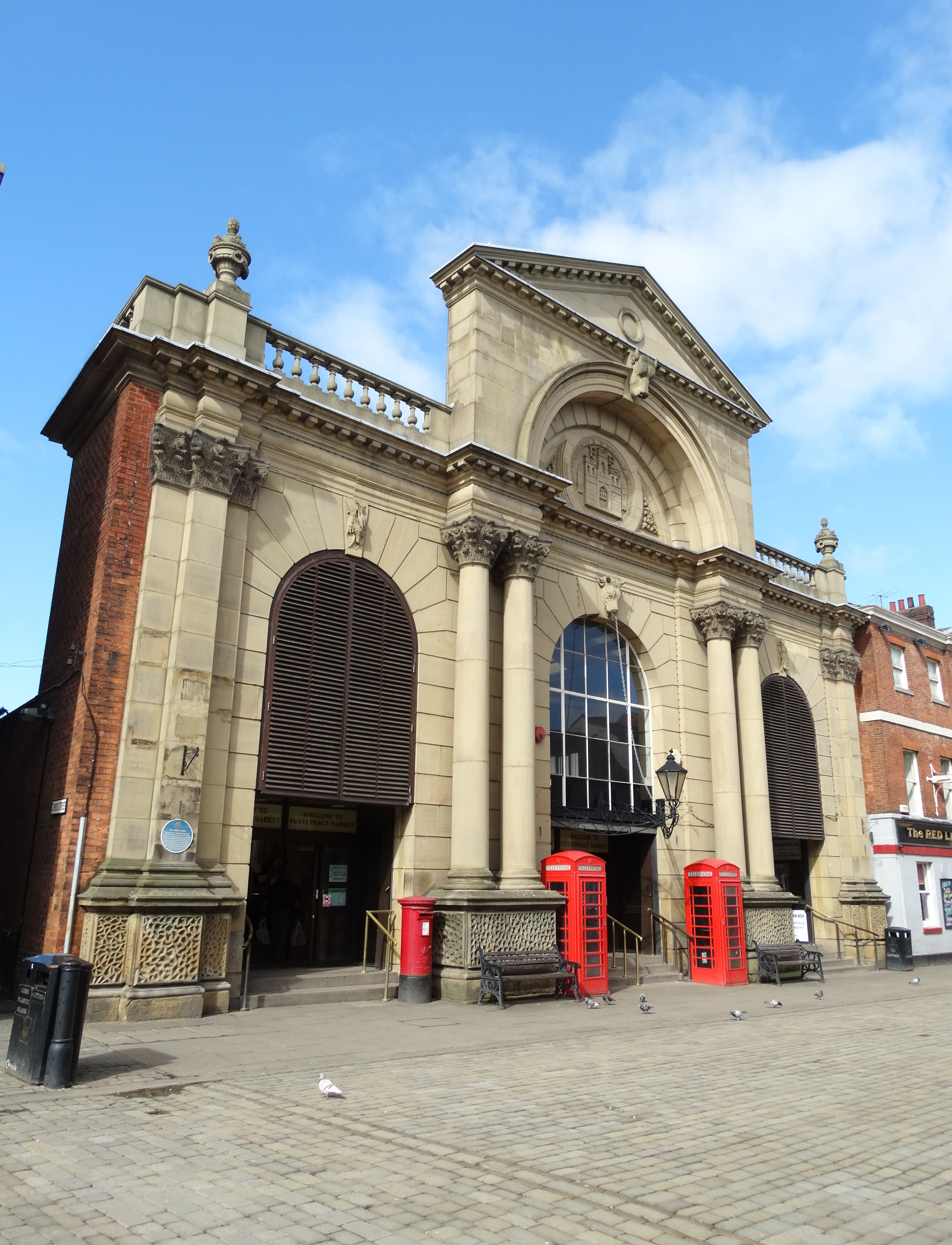
- Pontefract Market Hall

- Shown in West Yorkshire

General information
- Classification

Listed Building – Grade II
- Designated: 29 July 1950
- Reference no.: 1313248
- Location: Pontefract, England
- Coordinates: 53.6920°N 1.3108°W
- Construction started: 1859
- Completed: 1860

Design and construction
- Architect: Joseph Wilson

Pontefract Market Hall is a market hall in Pontefract, West Yorkshire, England. It was completed in 1860. Pontefract market takes place both in the hall and on the Market Place on which the hall is situated. It was designated a Grade II listed building in 1950.

== History ==
The frontage was constructed from 1859 to 1860 to a design by Joseph Wilson. The hall has been altered and adapted since and includes additions as late as the 1960s. The building was opened in 1860 by Lord Palmerston. There has been a market on this site since the 14th century.

== Architectural style ==
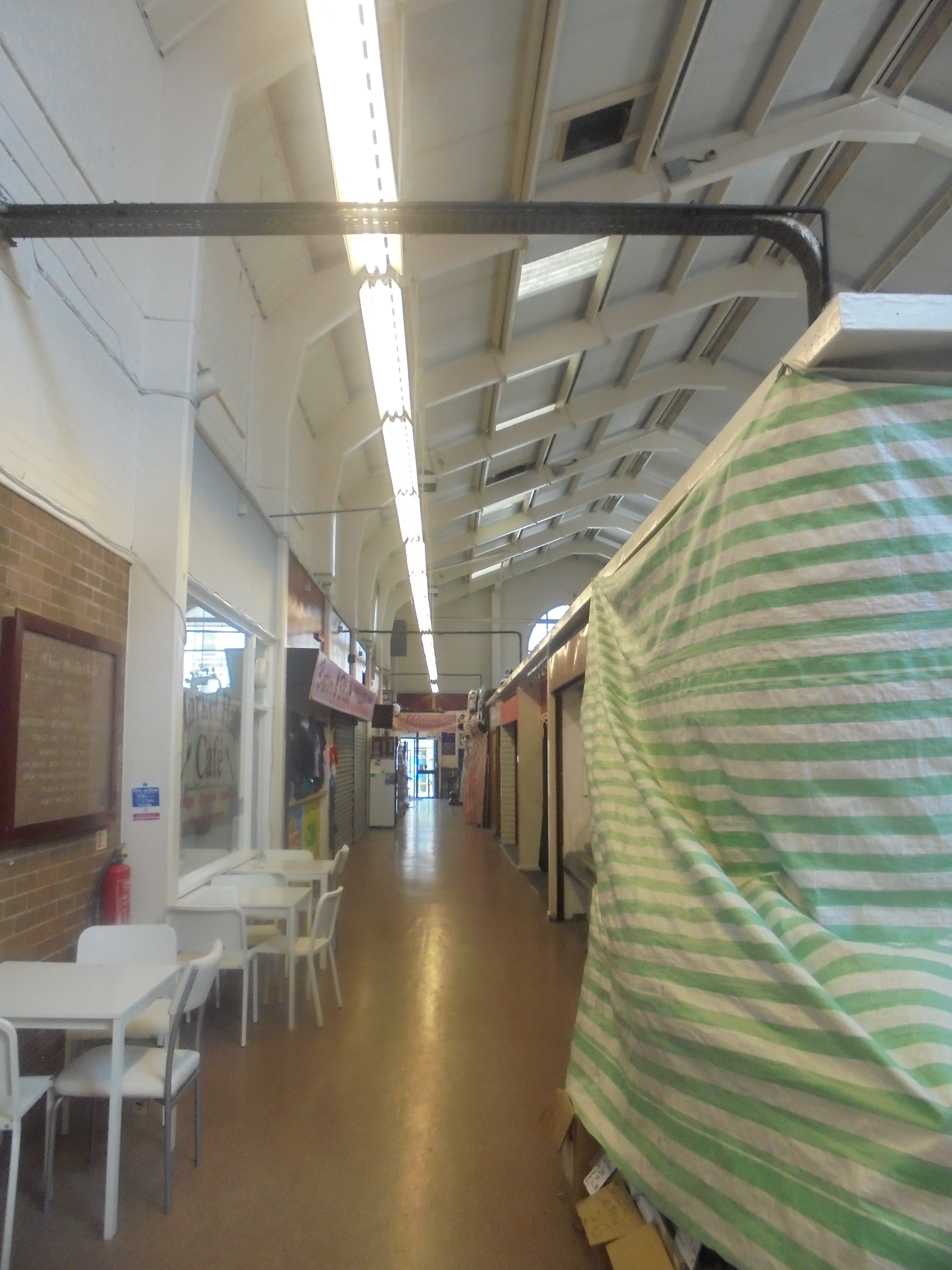
interior of the market

The front is of dressed ashlar and the rear of brick. The current roof is of twentieth-century construction and is of metal construction with part-glazing. The front has three prominent bays. The two side bays have Corinthian pilasters with moulded plinths. The central bay has a tall parapet with a large semi-circular arch and bull's head keystone and the arms of the Borough of Pontefract. The interior has been largely altered, most recently in the 1960s, and is not listed.

== Usage ==
The hall is open six days a week and contains 28 market stalls.

== See also ==
- Listed buildings in Pontefract
