= All Saints' Church, Pontefract =

All Saints' Church
- Church of All Saints
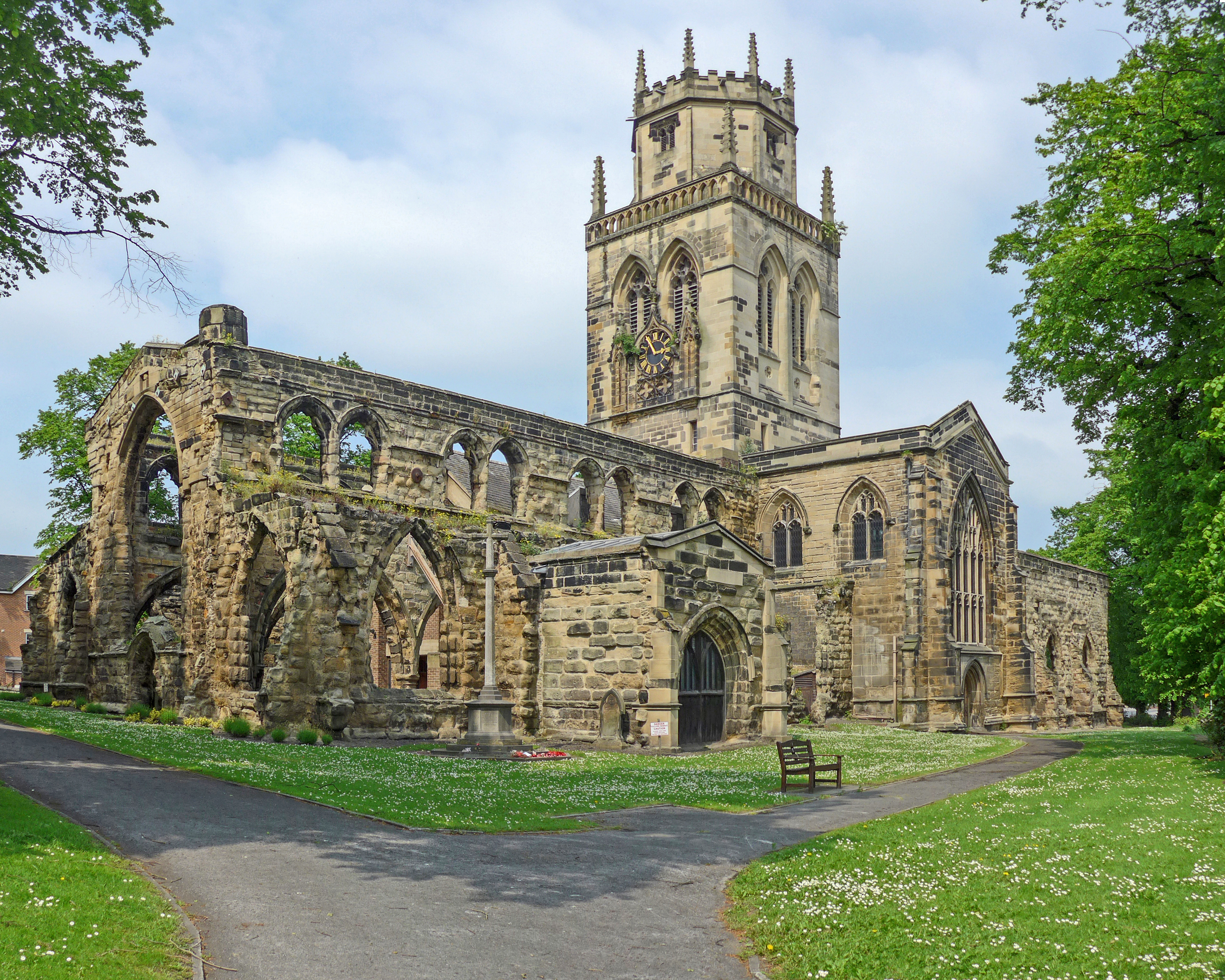
- All Saints' Church
- 53°41′46″N 1°18′03″W
- OS grid reference: SE 46266 22411
- Location: North Baileygate, Pontefract, West Yorkshire
- Country: England
- Denomination: Church of England
- Website: http://www.cofe-pontefract.co.uk/all-saints/

History
- Status: Parish church

Architecture
- Completed: 14th-15th century (outer church) 1967 (inner church)

Administration
- Province: York
- Diocese: Leeds
- Archdeaconry: Pontefract
- Deanery: Pontefract
- Parish: Pontefract

Clergy
- Vicar: The Rev'd Ian Bullock

The Church of All Saints in Pontefract, West Yorkshire, England is an active Church of England parish church in the archdeaconry of Pontefract and the Diocese of Leeds. The church consists of two structures, an outer church constructed in the 14th and 15th century and ruined in the English Civil War and a smaller inner church completed in the late 1960s. The church has been Grade II* listed since 29 July 1950. The church is one of two Anglican churches in the town centre; the other being St Giles'.

== History ==
The outer structure dates from the 14th and 15th century. The church was held by the Royalists at the beginning of the English Civil War; in December 1644 the Parliamentarians besieged the church which was held by the Royalists armed with 11 cannons. In the siege by Parliamentarians, the church suffered extensive damage with 60 18lb cannonballs being fired in one day from Monkhill. In June 1645, the church now under the occupation of Parliamentarians was besieged by Royalists who occupied Pontefract Castle. In defending the church the Parliamentarians made defenses within the already ruined church and pillaged the church of its materials. By 1649 the church roof had been completely removed. After its partial destruction, church services had to be held in St Giles' Church in the town; St Giles was previously a chapel of ease to All Saints, but St Giles became the de facto church in the town.

== Architectural style ==
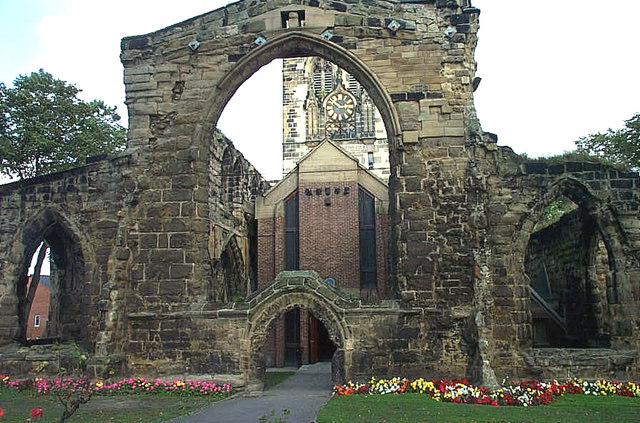
The new church within the old

=== Exterior ===
==== 14th- and 15th-century outer church ====
The outer church is of 14th- and 15th-century origins and is largely ruinous. Alterations were made to the ruins in 1838. The outer church is of a cruciform plan; built of Ashlar sandstone with some rendering. The ruined nave with north and south porches contains the newer structure. The ruined structure has an octagonal tower added in the 18th century. There is a heavily ruined aisled chancel with a 19th-century inserted sanctuary. The south aisle of the nave has four bays with a porch in the second. The nave has a south clerestory with four windows of twin trefoiled lights with a continuous hoodmould. The west end of the nave is buttressed flank with a four-centred arched doorway. The North nave is as the south with a two-storey porch in the second bay. The central tower has paired windows each with two trefoiled lights with a quatrefoil in the arch and hoodmoulds. The tower has a clock face in an ogee crocketed canopy.

==== 20th-century inner church ====
The inner church was completed in 1967 to a design by George Pace. It is of brick construction with a pitched roof. The front is adorned with five medieval heads.

=== Interior ===
==== 14th- and 15th-century outer church ====
The nave has arcades with octagonal piers and pointed arches. The nave is built over with the 1967 church obscuring much of the floor plan.

==== 20th-century inner church ====
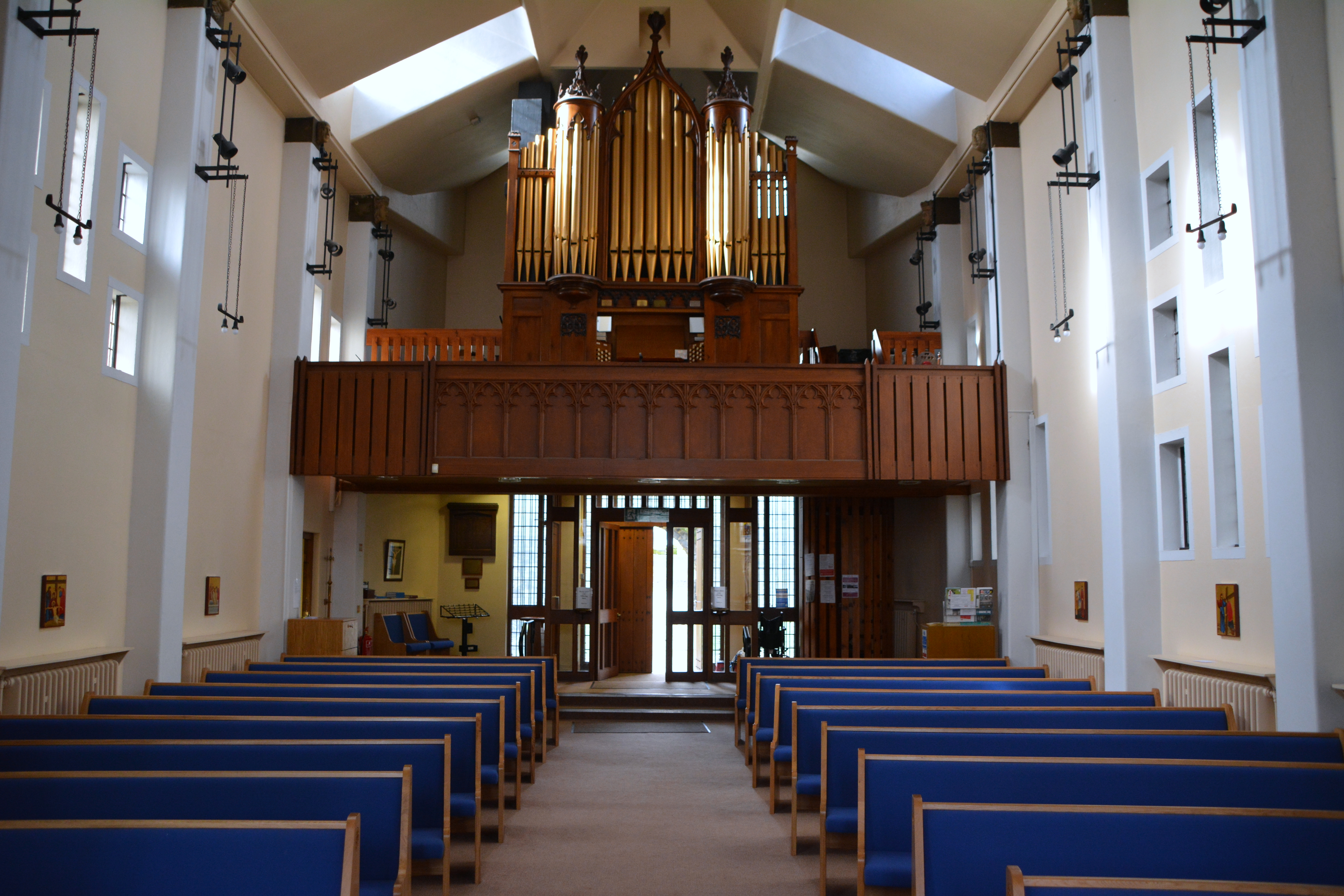
Interior of the inner church

The inner church was completed in 1967; it contained Victorian pews, which have since been replaced. The south chancel aisle has an ogee-headed tomb niche. The north and south walls have offset windows and the roof skylights, positioned so not to be obscured by the ruins of the outer church. The walls are whitewashed. There is a mezzanine above the entrance with a pipe organ positioned on top. There is an octagonal stone font.

== Location and access ==
The church is located on North Baileygate; separated from the town centre by Pontefract Castle which lies to the west. The closest railway station is Pontefract Monkhill which is situated around a quarter of a mile from the church.

== See also ==
- Grade II* listed buildings in West Yorkshire
- Listed buildings in Pontefract
- St George in the East - a London church ruined in the Blitz, with a modern church constructed within
