= Pontefract Town Hall =

Municipal building in Pontefract, West Yorkshire, England

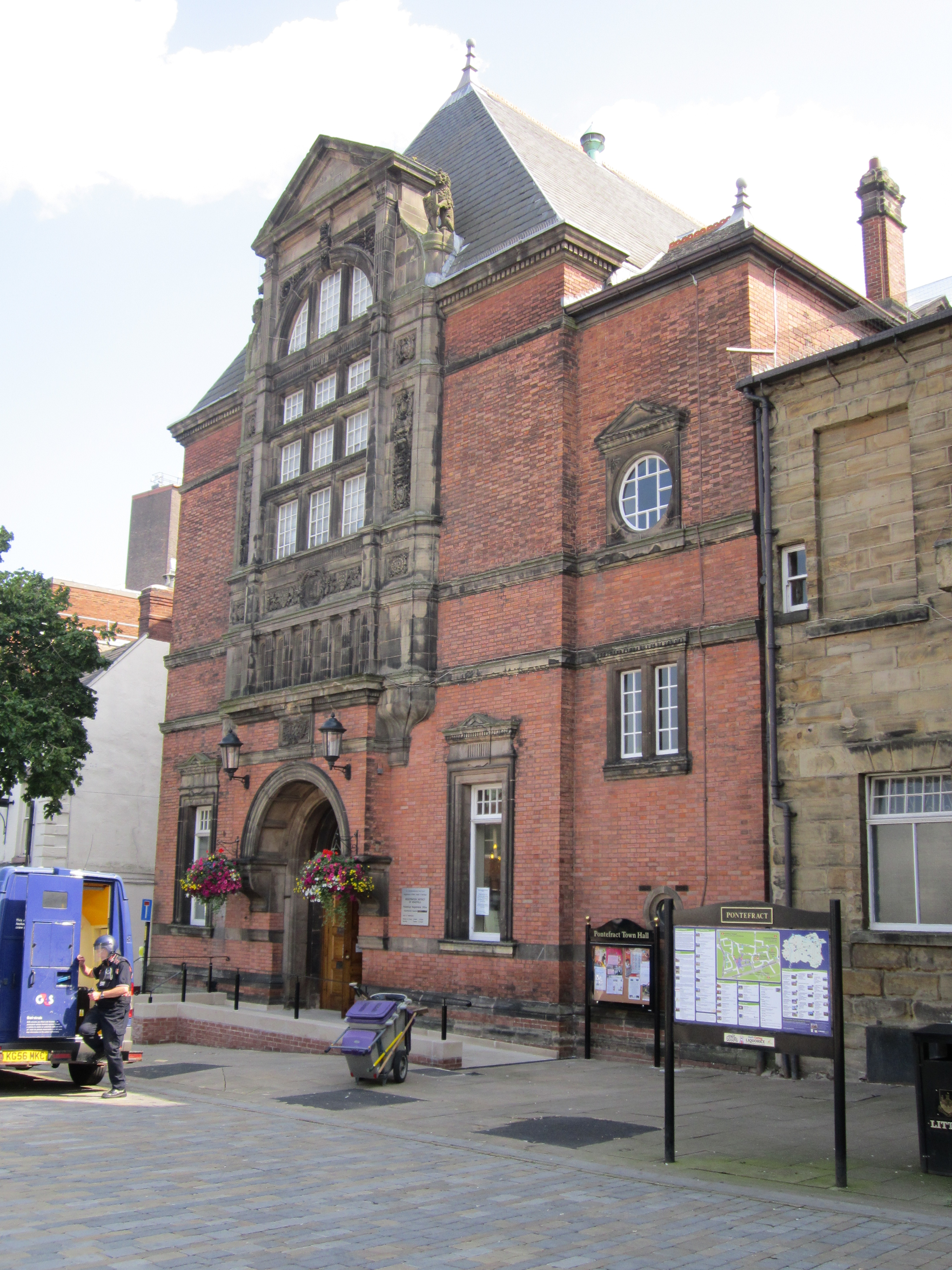
- Bridge Street elevation

- Location within West Yorkshire

General information
- Architectural style: Jacobean
- Classification

Listed Building – Grade II
- Designated: 15 November 1988
- Reference no.: 1184866
- Location: Pontefract, England
- Coordinates: 53.6929°N 1.3100°W
- Completed: 1882

Design and construction
- Architects: Henry Perkin and George Bertram Bulmer

Pontefract Town Hall is a town hall in Pontefract, West Yorkshire, England. It was completed in 1882. It is now owned and used by Wakefield Council as a register office. The building has been Grade II listed since 15 November 1988.

== History ==
The present building was commissioned by Pontefract Borough Council as the new assembly rooms for the town after the council deemed the old town hall to be insufficient for their then requirements, especially for concerts, balls and public meetings. A design competition was arranged and the winning design was selected for the new assembly rooms following a competition for which 59 entries were submitted. The building was designed by Henry Perkin and George Bertram Bulmer of Leeds and completed in 1882.

The civic leaders and magistrates started to hold their meetings in the assembly rooms from the early 20th century. The building remained the meeting place for Pontefract Borough Council but ceased to be the local seat of Government when the enlarged Wakefield Metropolitan District Council was formed in 1974. The building was the subject of an extensive restoration programme in 1996.

Since it was formed by the then Vicar of St. Giles Church, the Reverend Jack Peel, in 1949, the St. Giles with St. Mary's Pantomime and Theatre Society have been staging pantomimes in the assembly rooms. Performances in the 1950s included a pantomime based on a folk tale from One Thousand and One Nights entitled Aladdin; more recent performances have included a pantomime based on another folk tale from One Thousand and One Nights entitled Sinbad the Sailor in 2011 and a pantomime based on a fairy tale by Hans Christian Andersen entitled the Snow Queen in 2020.

== Architectural style ==
=== Exterior ===
The building is of red brick in Flemish bond dressed with ashlar sandstone and a steeply pitched Welsh slate roof and is Jacobean in style. The Bridge Street facade has one bay and a leaved panelled door situated below a fanlight under a round-arched portal with datestone.

=== Interior ===
There is a central entrance hall with staircase leading up to the first floor which has a galleried assembly room. The assembly room has a gallery with decorative panels to gallery front and an arched ceiling with transverse ribs.

== See also ==
- Listed buildings in Pontefract
