= Pontefract Hermitage =

- The Hermitage, Southgate
- Interactive map of the Pontefract Hermitage area

General information
- Status: Preserved; scheduled historic site
- Type: Subterranean hermitage
- Architectural style: Rock-cut
- Location: Southgate, Pontefract, West Yorkshire, WF8 1PL, England
- Coordinates: 53.690597°N 1.309931°W
- Grid position: SE456217
- Construction started: 1386
- Completed: late 15th century (alterations)
- Client: Robert de Laythorpe & Brother Adam

Technical details
- Structural system: Subterranean rock-cut chambers in carboniferous sandstone

Listed Building – Grade I
- Designated: 15 November 1988
- Reference no.: 1135427

Pontefract Hermitage is a medieval rock-cut subterranean hermitage located beneath Southgate in Pontefract, West Yorkshire, England. Carved directly into the local carboniferous sandstone, the subterranean complex comprises two distinct chambers and a steep spiral staircase leading down to a natural rock-cut water well. The hermitage was designated a Grade I listed building on 15 November 1988. The hermitage can be visited on scheduled open days.

== History ==
=== Medieval origins and endowment ===
Pontefract has a documented tradition of anchorites and hermits dating back to the early 13th century. The earliest named hermit, Peter of Pomfret, gained notoriety after prophesying the downfall of King John in 1213, an event dramatised in William Shakespeare's history play King John.

The present subterranean hermitage was formally established in 1386. The founding charter records that Robert de Laythorpe, a prominent burgess of Pontefract, along with his son Adam, granted the rock-hewn dwelling and surrounding parcel of land on Southgate to Brother Adam, an anchorite friar, for his lifetime. The estate was granted in frankalmoign (free alms) on condition that Brother Adam pray for the souls of the founders and the royal family. The hermitage later passed under the guardianship of the Augustinian Priory of St Oswald at Nostell, which maintained the site until the Dissolution of the Monasteries in the 1530s.

=== 1854 rediscovery and modern history ===
Following the Reformation, the ground above the hermitage was developed for tenements and coaching stables, covering the entrance and obscuring its location from local memory.

The existence of the hermitage was forgotten until October 1854, when municipal navvies digging a deep sewer main along Southgate unexpectedly broke through the sandstone vaulting. Subsequent exploration by local antiquarians revealed the dual-chamber layout, the spiral well shaft, and medieval candle niches containing remnants of tallow.

The site sits directly beneath the grounds of the former Pontefract General Infirmary. Due to its subterranean position and environmental vulnerability, access is strictly controlled, though public open days are periodically arranged by Wakefield Council and local heritage groups.

== Architecture and layout ==
The complex is carved entirely out of solid carboniferous sandstone, arranged across two main chambers set at different levels:

=== The Oratory (Western Chamber) ===
The western chamber, known as the Oratory, is believed to be a late-15th-century addition, measuring approximately 14 feet (4.3 m) by 8 feet (2.4 m) with a vaulted domed ceiling rising to 8 feet (2.4 m). It contains a rock-carved altar, a hearth with a flue cut through the stone bedrock, a low stool, a stone bench, and a raised bed shelf. The entrance features a pointed arch incorporating reused 15th-century masonry, likely salvaged from the nearby Dominican Friary of St Richard.

=== Eastern Chamber and Spiral Well ===
The eastern chamber is entered through an original 14th-century basket-arched doorway fitted with rebates for heavy timber draw-bolts.

From this lower chamber, a narrow barrel-vaulted passage connects to a rock-cut spiral staircase descending through 64 steps into the bedrock. Tool marks from medieval picks and chisels remain clearly visible along the shaft walls, alongside four small candle niches. Near the base of the staircase is a low-relief rock carving depicting Death as a skeleton carrying a spear. At the bottom of the shaft, the staircase terminates at a rock-hewn basin fed directly by the local subterranean water table.
