= Pontefract =

Market town in West Yorkshire, England

Coordinates: 53.691°N 1.312°W

- Town
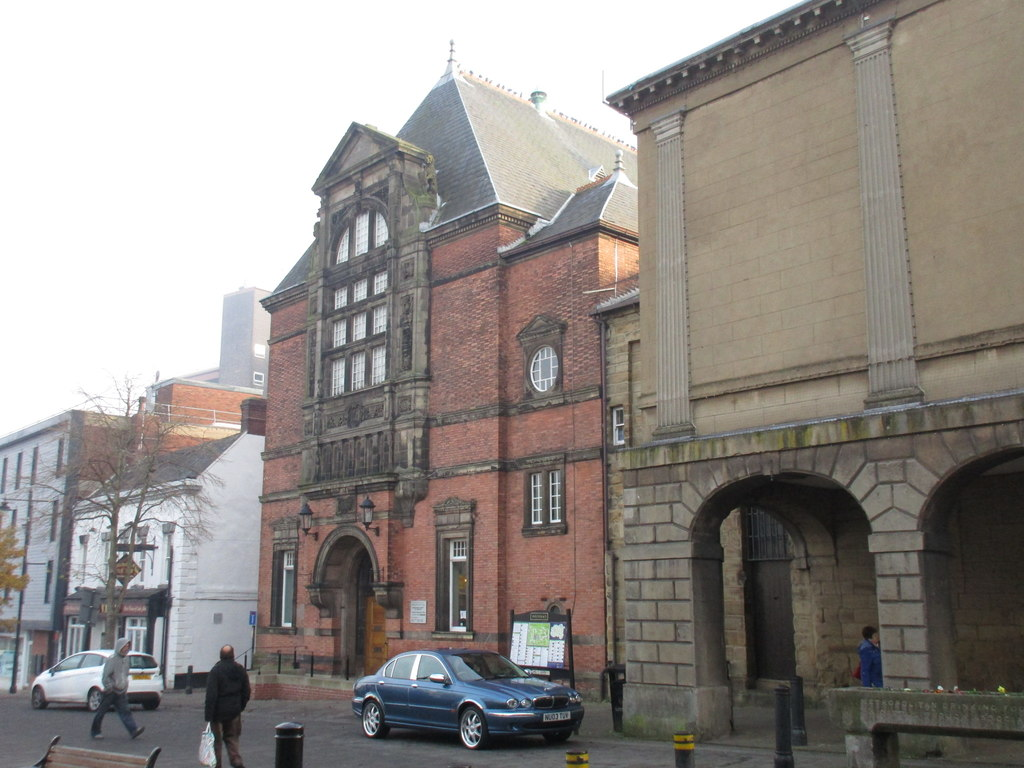
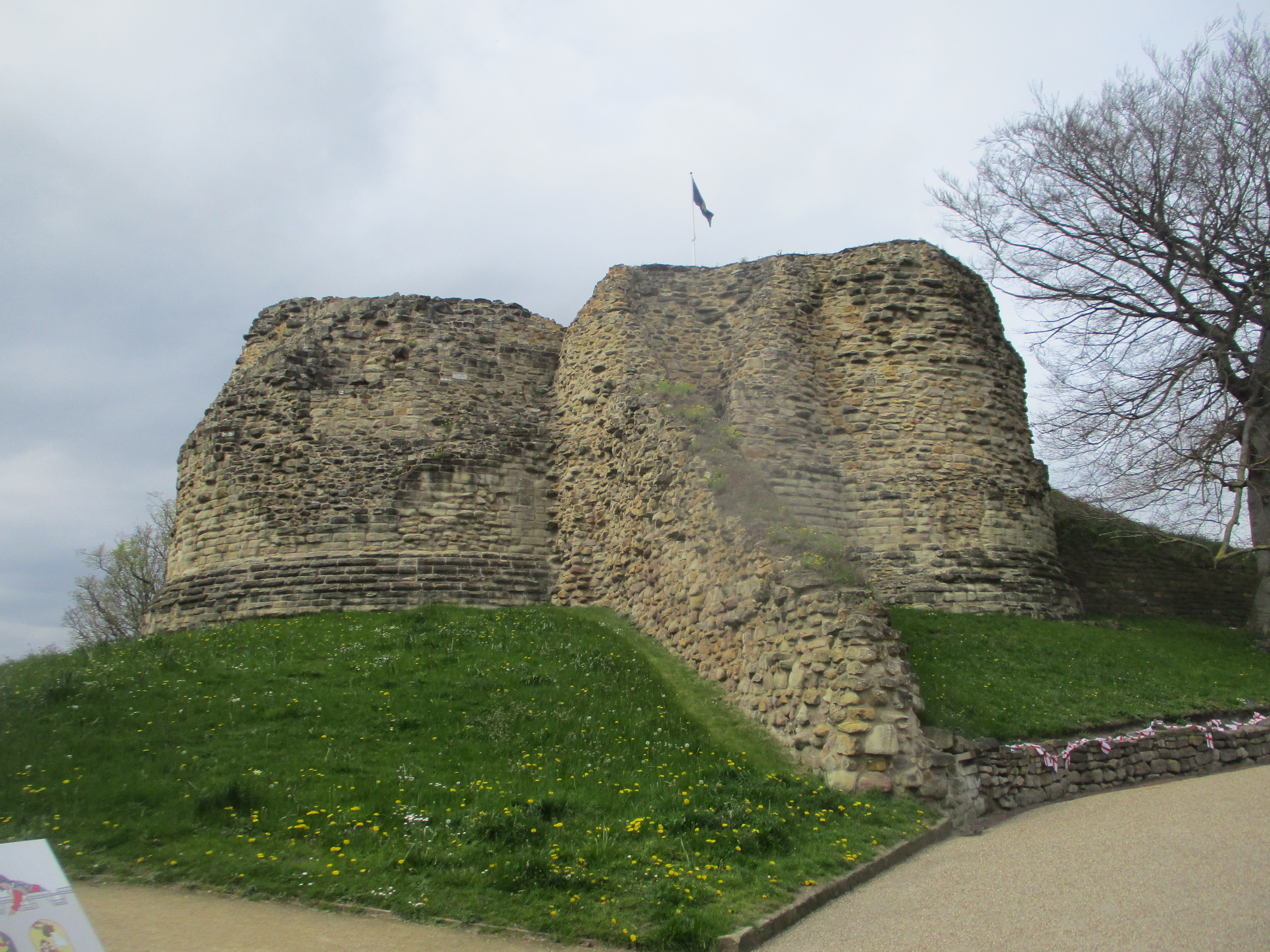
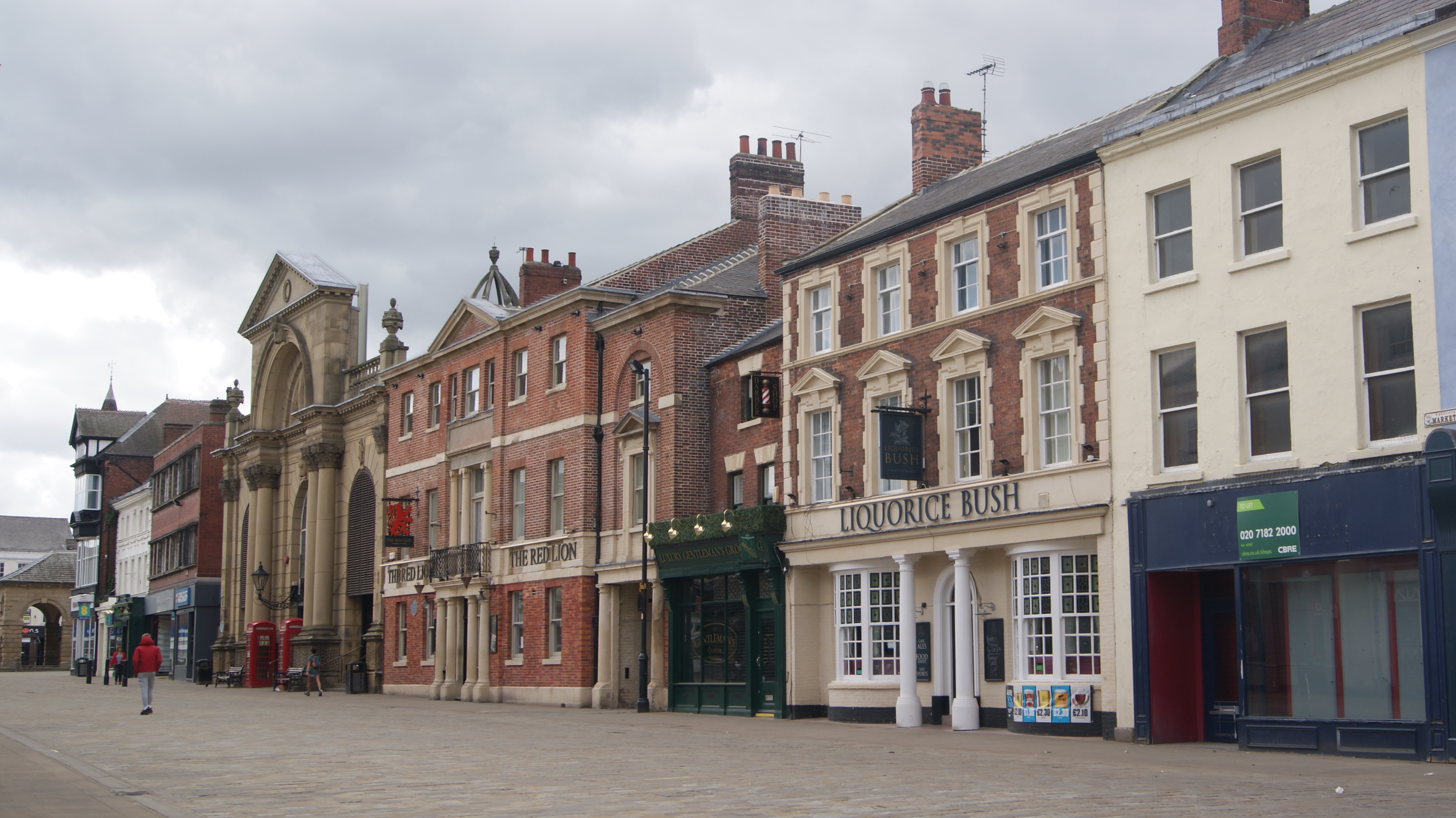
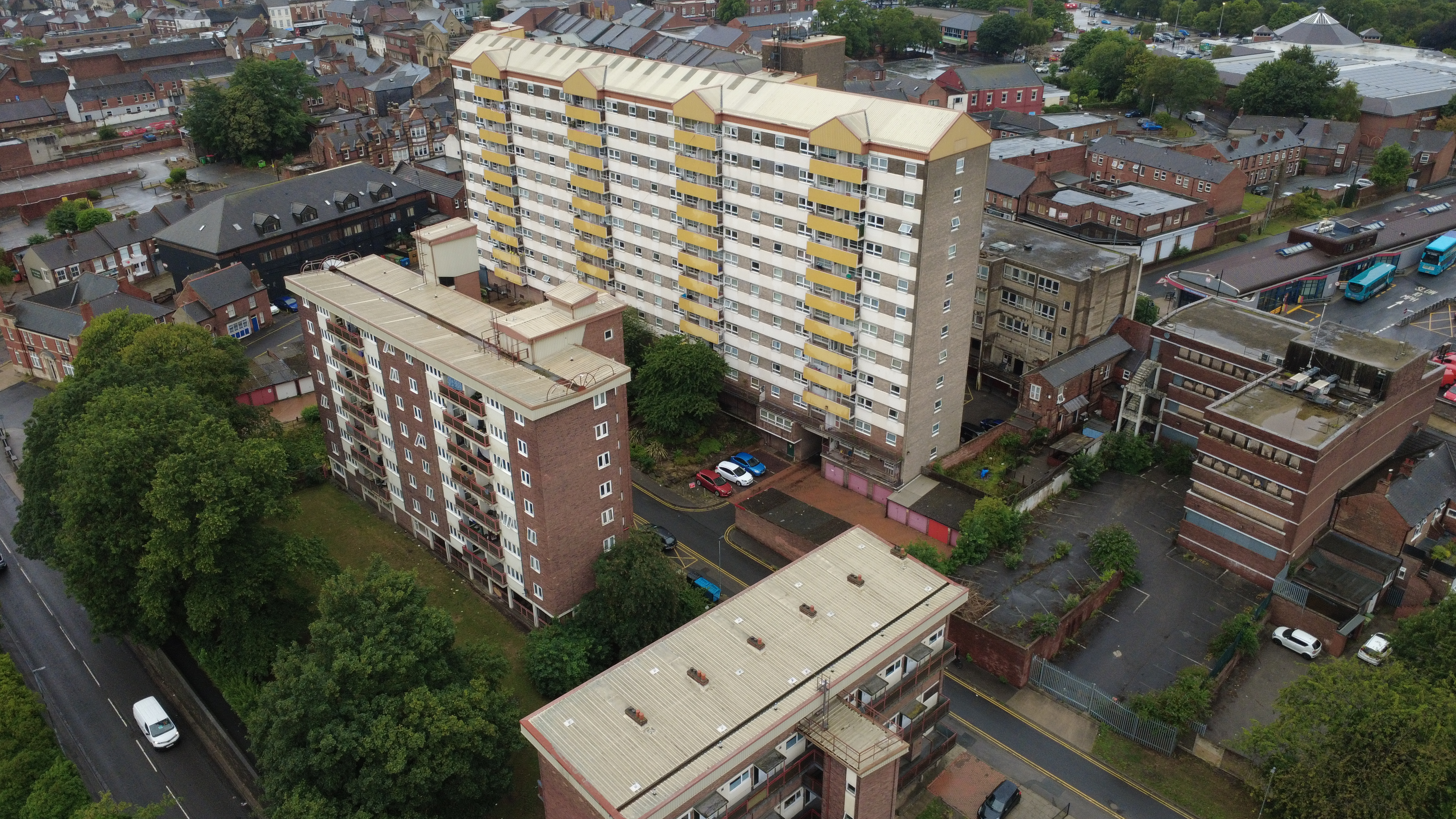
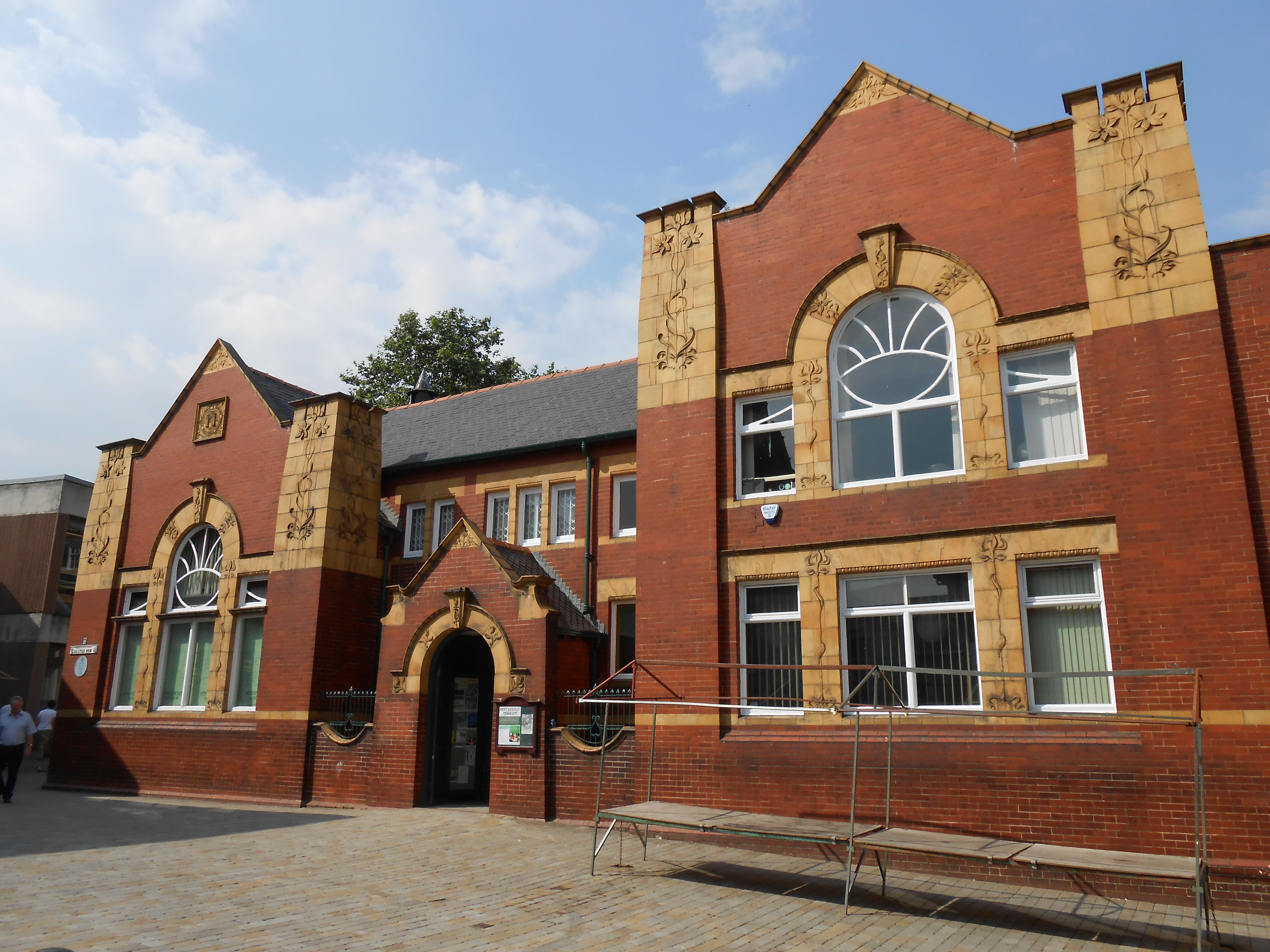
- The Town Hall The Castle The Marketplace Horsefair Flats The Museum

- Location within West Yorkshire
- Population: 30,881 (North+South Wards 2011)
- OS grid reference: SE455215
  - London: 257 mi (414 km)
- Metropolitan borough: City of Wakefield
- Metropolitan county: West Yorkshire
- Region: Yorkshire and the Humber
- Country: England
- Sovereign state: United Kingdom
- Post town: PONTEFRACT
- Postcode district: WF8
- Dialling code: 01977
- Police: West Yorkshire
- Fire: West Yorkshire
- Ambulance: Yorkshire
- UK Parliament: Pontefract, Castleford and Knottingley

Arms of Pontefract depicting the castle, used before Pontefract was incorporated into Wakefield.

Pontefract is a historic market town in the City of Wakefield, a metropolitan district in West Yorkshire, England. It lies to the east of Wakefield and south of Castleford. Historically part of the West Riding of Yorkshire, it had a population of 30,881 at the 2011 Census.

Pontefract's motto is Post mortem patris pro filio, Latin for "After the death of the father, support the son", a reference to the town's Royalist sympathies in the English Civil War. Small villages and settlements in the immediate area include Stapleton.

== Etymology ==
At the end of the 11th century, the modern township of Pontefract consisted of two distinct localities: Tanshelf and Kirkby. The historian Orderic Vitalis recorded that, in 1069, William the Conqueror travelled across Yorkshire to put down an uprising which had sacked York.

On his journey to the town, he discovered that a crossing of the River Aire near what is modern-day Pontefract had been blockaded by local Anglo-Scandinavian insurgents, who had broken the bridge and held the opposite bank in force. Such a crossing point would have been important to the town, providing access to other settlements to the north and east, such as York. Historians believe that it is this historical event which gives the township of Pontefract its modern name. The name Pontefract originates from the Latin pons for bridge and fractus meaning broken. Pontefract was not recorded in the 1086 Domesday Book, but it was noted as Pontefracto in 1090, four years after the Domesday survey.

== History ==
=== Neolithic ===
In 2007, an extension of Ferrybridge Henge – a Neolithic henge – was discovered near Pontefract during a survey in preparation for the construction of a row of houses. Once the survey was complete, construction continued.

=== Roman ===
The modern town is situated near an old Roman road (now the A639), described as the "Roman Ridge". This is believed to form part of an alternative route from Doncaster to York, via Castleford and Tadcaster, as a diversion of the major Roman road Ermine Street, which may have been used to avoid having to cross the River Humber near North Ferriby during rough weather conditions over the Humber.

=== Anglo-Scandinavian history ===
The period of Yorkshire's history between the demise of the Viking king, Eric Bloodaxe, in 954 and the arrival of the Normans in 1068 is known as the Anglo-Scandinavian age. The modern township of Pontefract consisted of two Anglo-Scandinavian settlements, Tanshelf and Kirkby. In Yorkshire, place-name locations often contain the distinctive Danish '-by' i.e. Kirkby and today, the major streets in Pontefract are designated by the Danish word 'gate' e.g. Bailygate.

The Anglo-Scandinavian township, Tanshelf, recorded as Tateshale, Tateshalla, Tateshalle or Tatessella in the 'Domesday Book, is today occupied by the town of Pontefract. The Anglo-Saxon Chronicle made a reference to Tanshelf in 947 when King Eadred of England met with the ruling council of Northumbria to accept its submission. King Eadred did not enjoy Northumbria's support for long, and a year later the kingdom voted Eric Bloodaxe King of York.

When the Domesday survey was commissioned by William the Conqueror in 1086, Tanshelf was a sizeable settlement. It had a priest, 60 petty burgesses, 16 cottagers, 16 villagers and 8 smallholders, amounting to 101 people. The size of the population might have been four or five times larger as the only people listed were landholders. Tanshelf had a church, a fishery and three mills. Archaeologists discovered the remains of a church on The Booths, off North Baileygate, below the castle. The oldest grave dates from around 690. The church may have been similar to the church at Ledsham. The area of the town market place was the meeting place of the Osgoldcross wapentake. In the Anglo-Saxon period, part of the modern town was known by the Anglo-Scandinavian name as Kirkby.

=== Medieval ===
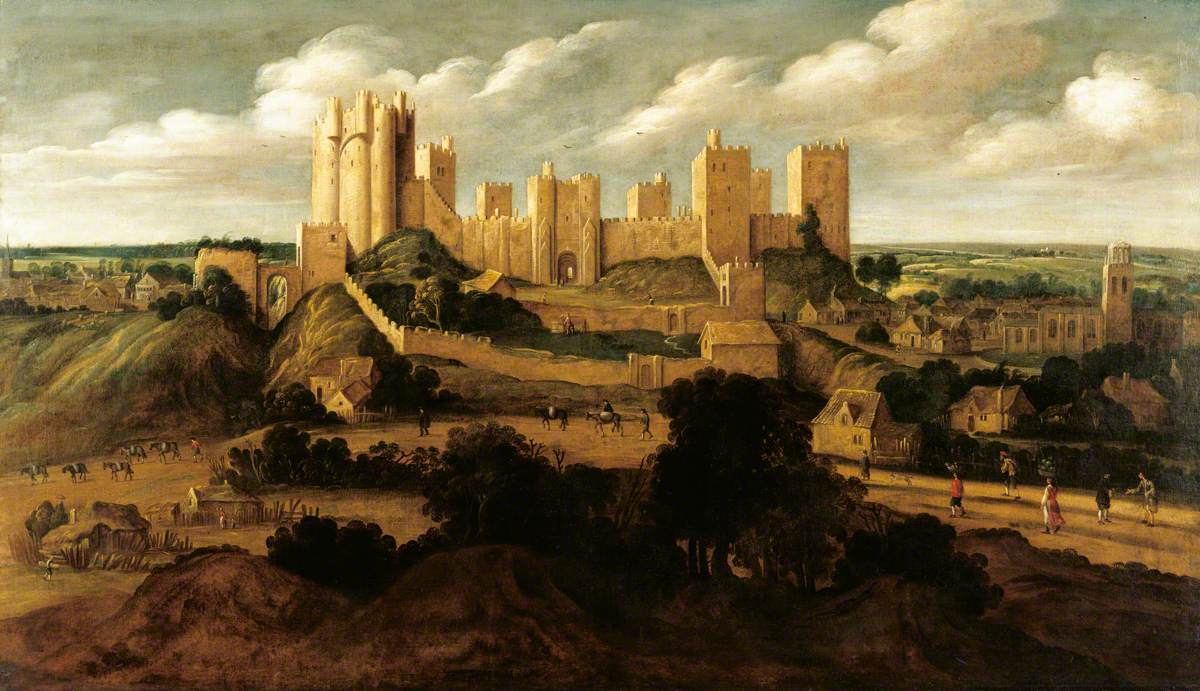
Painting of Pontefract Castle in the early 17th century by Alexander Keirincx

After the Norman conquest in 1066, almost all of Yorkshire came under the ownership of followers of William the Conqueror; one of whom was Ilbert de Lacy, who became the owner of Tateshale (Tanshelf) where he built a castle. Pontefract Castle began as a wooden motte and bailey castle before 1086 and was later rebuilt in stone. The de Lacys lived there for more than two centuries and were holders of the castle and the Honour of Pontefract from 1067 until the death of Alice de Lacy in 1348.

King Richard II was murdered at the castle in 1400. Little is known of the nature of his demise; Shakespeare may have "adjusted" the facts for his own purposes. At least three theories attempt to explain his death: either he was starved to death by his keepers, he starved himself to death or he was murdered by Sir Piers (Peter) Exton on 14 February 1399 or 1400.

=== Early modern history ===
In Elizabethan times the castle and the town were both referred to as "Pomfret". William Shakespeare's play Richard III mentions the castle:

Pomfret, Pomfret! O thou bloody prison,
Fatal and ominous to noble peers!
Within the guilty closure of thy walls
Richard the second here was hack'd to death;
And, for more slander to thy dismal seat,
We give thee up our guiltless blood to drink.

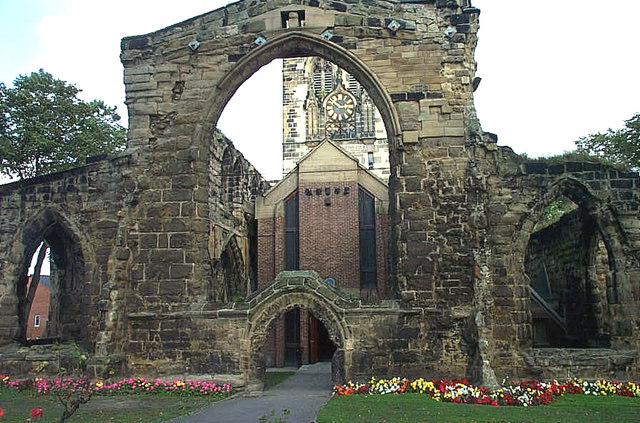
The new church within the old. After All Saints' Church was damaged during the civil war; a new one was built within

The town suffered throughout the English Civil War. In 1648–49, the castle was laid siege by Oliver Cromwell, who said it was "... one of the strongest inland garrisons in the kingdom." Three sieges by the Parliamentarians left the town "impoverished and depopulated". In March 1649, after the third siege, Pontefract inhabitants, fearing a fourth, petitioned Parliament for the castle to be slighted. The castle was a magnet for trouble and demolition began in April 1649. The castle ruins are publicly accessible.

Pontefract Priory, a Cluniac priory founded in 1090 by Robert de Lacy and dedicated to St John the Evangelist, was dissolved by royal authority in 1539. The priory maintained the Chartularies of St John, a collection of historic documents later discovered among family papers by Thomas Levett, the High Sheriff of Rutland, a native of Yorkshire, who gave them to Roger Dodsworth, an antiquary. They were published by the Yorkshire Archaeological Society.

== Governance ==
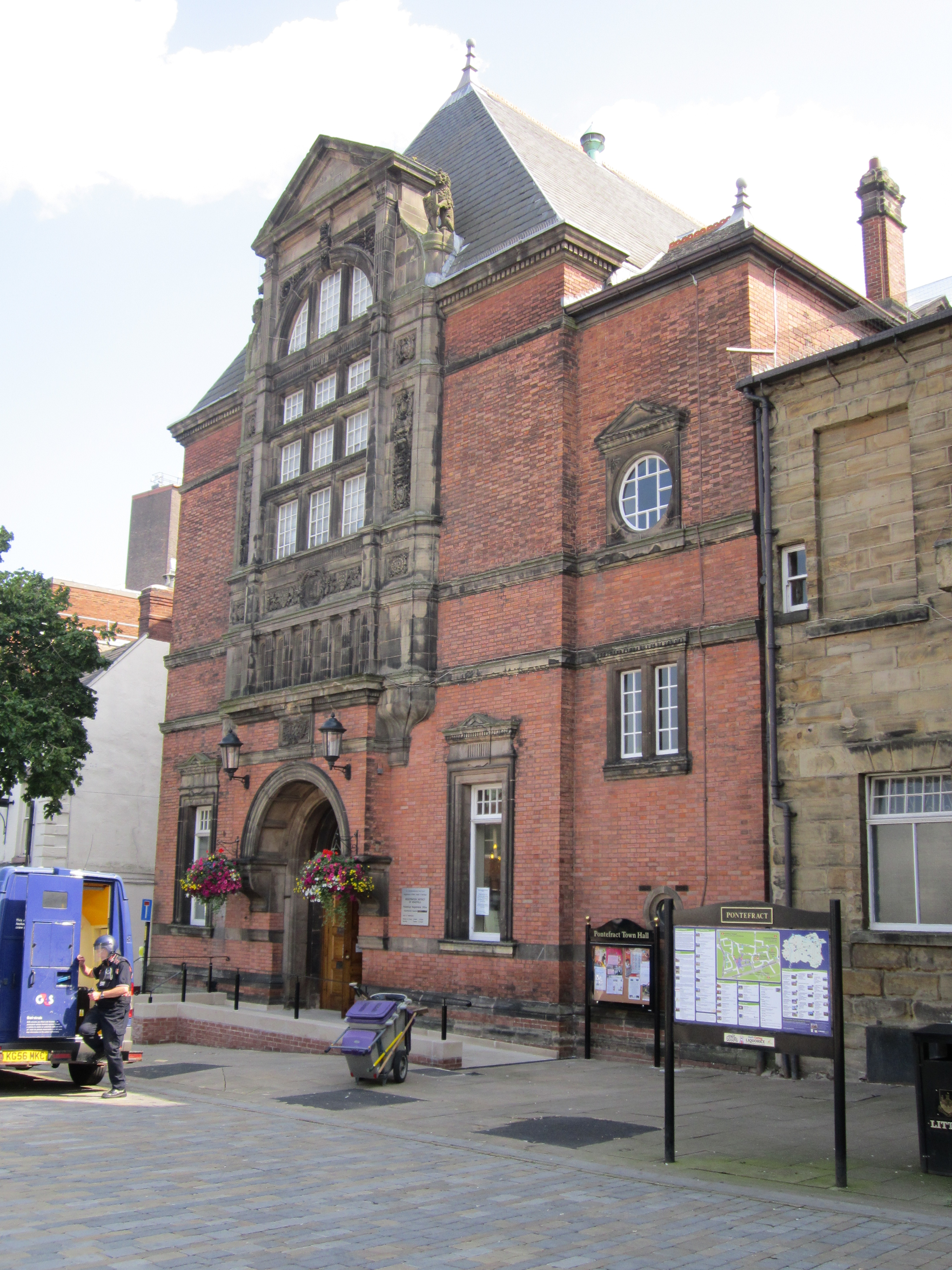
Pontefract Town Hall, now used as a register office

For local government purposes, the town lies in the City of Wakefield and is administered by Wakefield Council. It is divided into two electoral wards: Pontefract North and Pontefract South. Pontefract South was represented by two Labour councillors and one Conservative councillor and North ward represented by three Labour councillors in 2022.

From 1978 to 1997, ex-miner and former NUM branch leader Geoff Lofthouse (18 December 1925 – 1 November 2012) was Member of Parliament (MP) for the Pontefract and Castleford constituency. During this time, he became Deputy Speaker of the House of Commons. When the general election of 1997 was called, he stood down. He was made a peer on 11 June 1997.

Yvette Cooper was elected as the MP for the Pontefract and Castleford constituency at the 1997 general election. In her maiden speech to the House of Commons, Cooper said:

"It is true that my constituency is plagued by unemployment, but I represent hard-working people who are proud of their strong communities and who have fought hard across generations to defend them. They are proud of their socialist traditions, and have fought for a better future for their children and their grandchildren. In the Middle Ages, that early egalitarian, the real Robin Hood, lived, so we maintain, in the Vale of Wentbridge to the south of Pontefract. It was a great base from which to hassle the travelling fat cats on the Great North Road."

She served as Home Secretary and Foreign Secretary, having held a number of positions in the Labour governments up to 2010 and Shadow Cabinet roles. Pontefract and Castleford was merged with the Normanton constituency in a boundary change before the 2010 general election.

The seat, which had a history of mining and industry, has returned Labour MPs at general elections.

== Economy ==
Pontefract Market Place

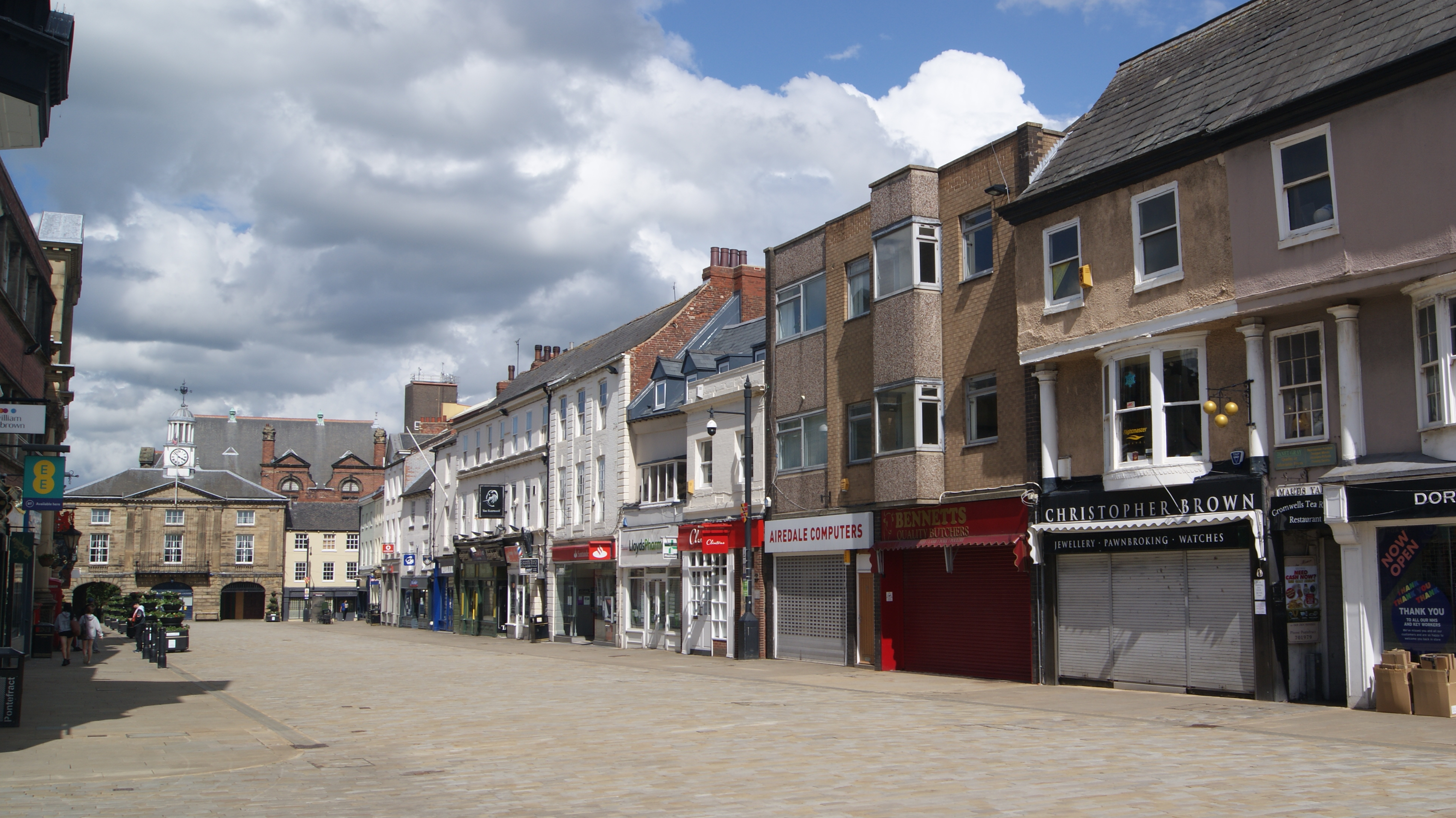
Market Place

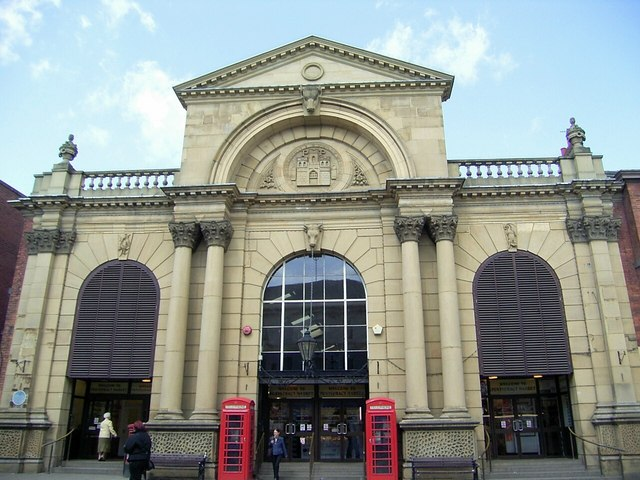
Pontefract market hall

Pontefract has been a market town since the Middle Ages; market days are Wednesday and Saturday, with a small market on Fridays. The covered market is open all week except Sundays. It is said by some that Pontefract once held a record for being the town with the highest number of pubs per square mile in the UK, but this is likely an urban legend and the title is held by another town.

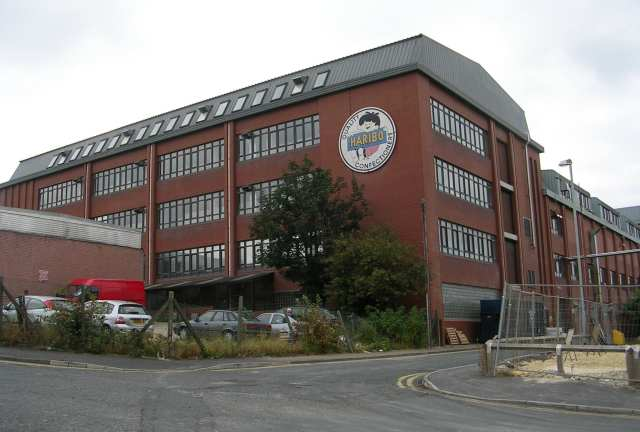
The Haribo factory

The town has a liquorice-sweet industry; the famous Pontefract cakes are produced in Pontefract, though the liquorice plant is no longer grown there. The town's two liquorice factories are owned by Haribo and Valeo Confectionery (formerly Tangerine). A Liquorice festival is held annually. Poet laureate Sir John Betjeman wrote a poem entitled "The Licorice Fields at Pontefract". In 2012, local farmer Robert Copley announced that he would be reintroducing a liquorice crop to Pontefract.

Close by is the site of the former coal-fired Ferrybridge power station, although the local coal mines largely closed in the 1990s, which contributed to high unemployment in the local area. The final colliery, Prince of Wales Colliery, closed in August 2002. It has since been redeveloped into a large housing estate named after the colliery.

== Amenities and services ==
The secondary schools in the town are Carleton High School in Carleton and the King's School on Mill Hill Lane, both for pupils aged 11–16. A sixth-form college, New College, is located on Park Lane.

The old Pontefract General Infirmary on Southgate was a general hospital; it is the place at which serial killer Harold Shipman began to murder his elderly patients. Beneath this building is an old hermitage, open to the public on certain days. Pontefract Museum, from which the hermitage schedule can be obtained, is in the town centre, housed in the former Carnegie library.

A new hospital was built on Friarwood Lane and opened in July 2010, with the new name of Pontefract Hospital; there is now a modern hospital building. Near to the hospital is Friarwood Valley Gardens, a rose garden, a sensory garden, a pinhole camera (formerly an aviary and earlier a Georgian gambling den) and an avenue of cherry trees. The park is listed at Grade II on the Register of Historic Parks and Gardens of Special Historic Interest in England.

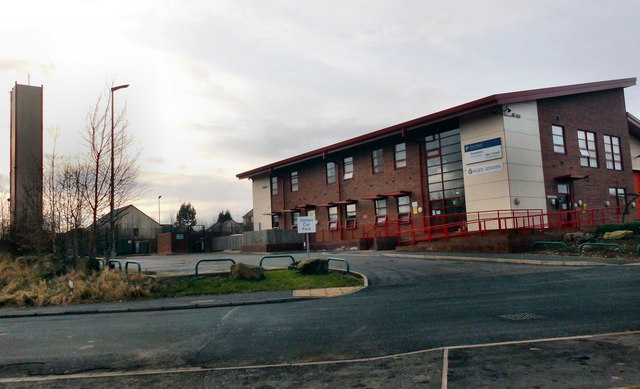
Pontefract Fire Station

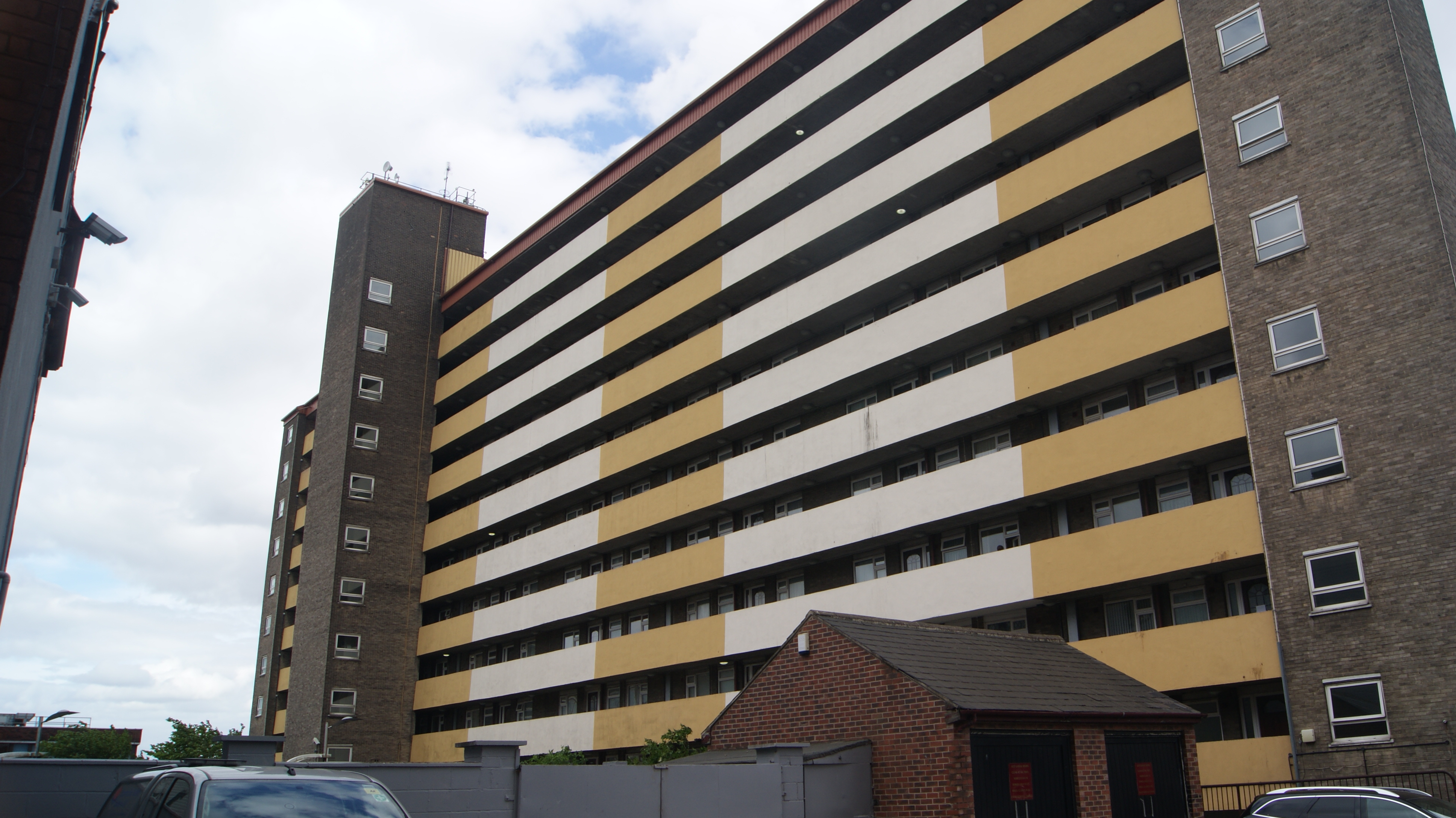
Luke Williams House. The Horsefair flats were designed by John Poulson and dominate the skyline in the east of the town

The local police force is West Yorkshire Police, with the town's neighbourhood policing team situated at the new fire station on Stumpcross Lane. The original police station in Sessions House Yard has been demolished since the divisional headquarters for the Wakefield District opened in Normanton and the neighbouring magistrates' court has moved to Leeds, following the closure of the Wakefield and Pontefract courts.

Fire cover is provided by West Yorkshire Fire and Rescue Service, with one pump (sometimes two) based at Pontefract Fire Station. Formerly located on Stuart Road in the town centre, the station has moved to a new site at Stumpcross Lane, by the A645 at the town's eastern edge. The new fire station provides cover for Knottingley; that town's fire station was closed as part of the merging of fire cover.

Ambulance cover is provided by Yorkshire Ambulance Service, whose depot is situated in neighbouring town, Castleford.

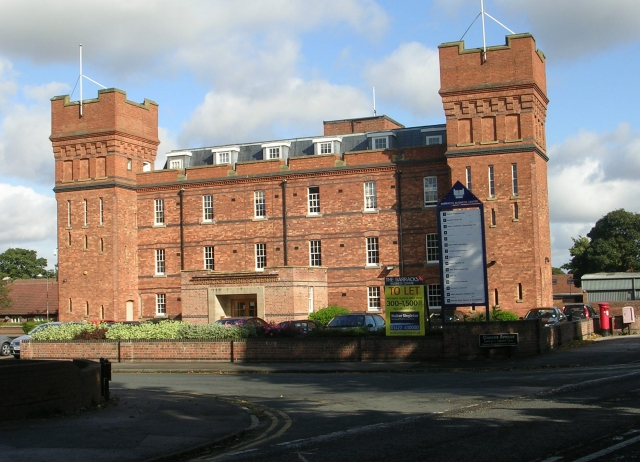
Barracks Business Centre, Wakefield Road

The Army Reserve, Army Cadet Force and Air Training Corps all have a presence within the town and are based at the historic Pontefract Barracks building on Wakefield Road. It now houses a Rifles Regiment Recruitment Team.

== Transport ==
Pontefract lies in close proximity to the A1, via a junction at the nearby village of Darrington, while access from the M62 motorway is via junction 32 (Castleford) and junction 33 (Knottingley).

Bus transport is provided by Arriva Yorkshire and Stagecoach Yorkshire, operating from Pontefract bus station as the town's main hub. Routes connect the town with Barnsley, Knottingley, Leeds, Selby and Wakefield.

There are three railway stations in the town:

- Pontefract Baghill is a stop on the Dearne Valley Line; Northern Trains operates services that connect York and Sheffield
- Pontefract Monkhill is a stop on the Pontefract Line, on which Northern Trains services link Leeds, Wakefield Westgate and Goole. In addition, Grand Central operates inter-city services between Bradford Interchange and London King's Cross that stop at Monkhill.
- Pontefract Tanshelf also lies on the Pontefract Line.

The closest airport is Leeds Bradford.

== Media, arts and entertainment ==
Local news and television programmes are provided by BBC Yorkshire and ITV Yorkshire. Television signals are received from the Emley Moor TV transmitter.

Local radio stations are BBC Radio Leeds on 92.4 FM, Greatest Hits Radio Yorkshire (formerly Ridings FM) on 106.8 FM, Heart Yorkshire on 106.2 FM, Hits Radio West Yorkshire (formerly Pulse 1) on 102.5 FM, Capital Yorkshire on 105.1 FM and 5 Towns FM, a community on-line radio station that broadcasts from Castleford.

The local newspaper is the Pontefract and Castleford Express.

Novelist Jack Vance, in the "Demon Princes" series, has named the capital of Aloysius, the main planet in the Vega system, after Pontefract. The hero of the series, Kirth Gersen, has his residence there.

Pontefract made local and national newspapers in April 2020, with a range of art which lay tribute to the key workers and NHS during the coronavirus outbreak. The art was painted by a local mural artist, Rachel List.

== Sport ==
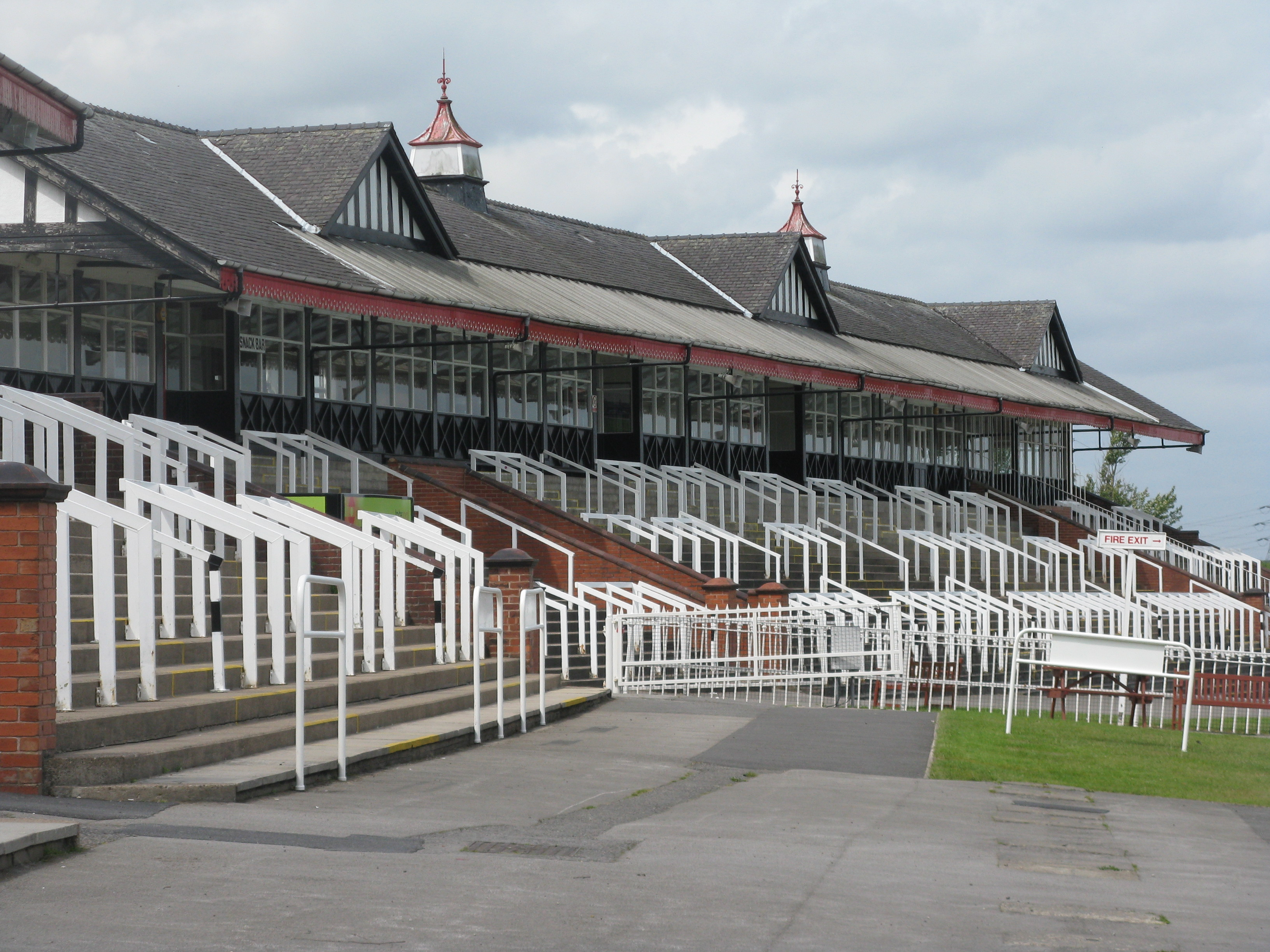
The Pontefract Racecourse grandstand

Featherstone Rovers is the area's professional rugby league club; the town is also home to the Pontefract Knights. In rugby union, Pontefract is based at Moor Lane, Carleton. It runs three senior sides as well as a number of junior and girls teams. Rugby union has been played in the town since the 19th century when Pontefract won the Yorkshire Cup.

Pontefract Racecourse is the longest continuous horse racing circuit in Europe at 2 miles 125 yards (3,333 m; 16.57 furlongs). It stages flat racing between the end of March and the end of October.

The town has its own non-league football club, Pontefract Collieries F.C., which was founded in 1958 and plays adjacent to the former Prince of Wales Colliery off Beechnut Lane. The team, known locally as "Ponte Colls", play in the Northern Premier League Division One North West (correct as of the 2021–22 season).

Pontefract used to boast two cricket clubs, Lakeside CC (based in Pontefract Park) and Pontefract CC (adjacent to Pontefract Collieries FC) but, by 2002, neither of these clubs were still in existence, leaving the town without its own club despite giving its name to the Pontefract and District Cricket League. Nowadays, cricketers must travel to clubs in neighbouring towns and villages, with the closest being Hundhill Hall Cricket Club based in the nearby village of East Hardwick.

With Pontypridd, Pontypool and Pont y Bala, Pontefract forms a group of parkruns known as “The Full Ponty”, a pun on The Full Monty.

A new sports centre is located at Pontefract Park which opened on 12 April 2021, which replaces the old swimming pool located on Stuart Road.

== Notable people ==
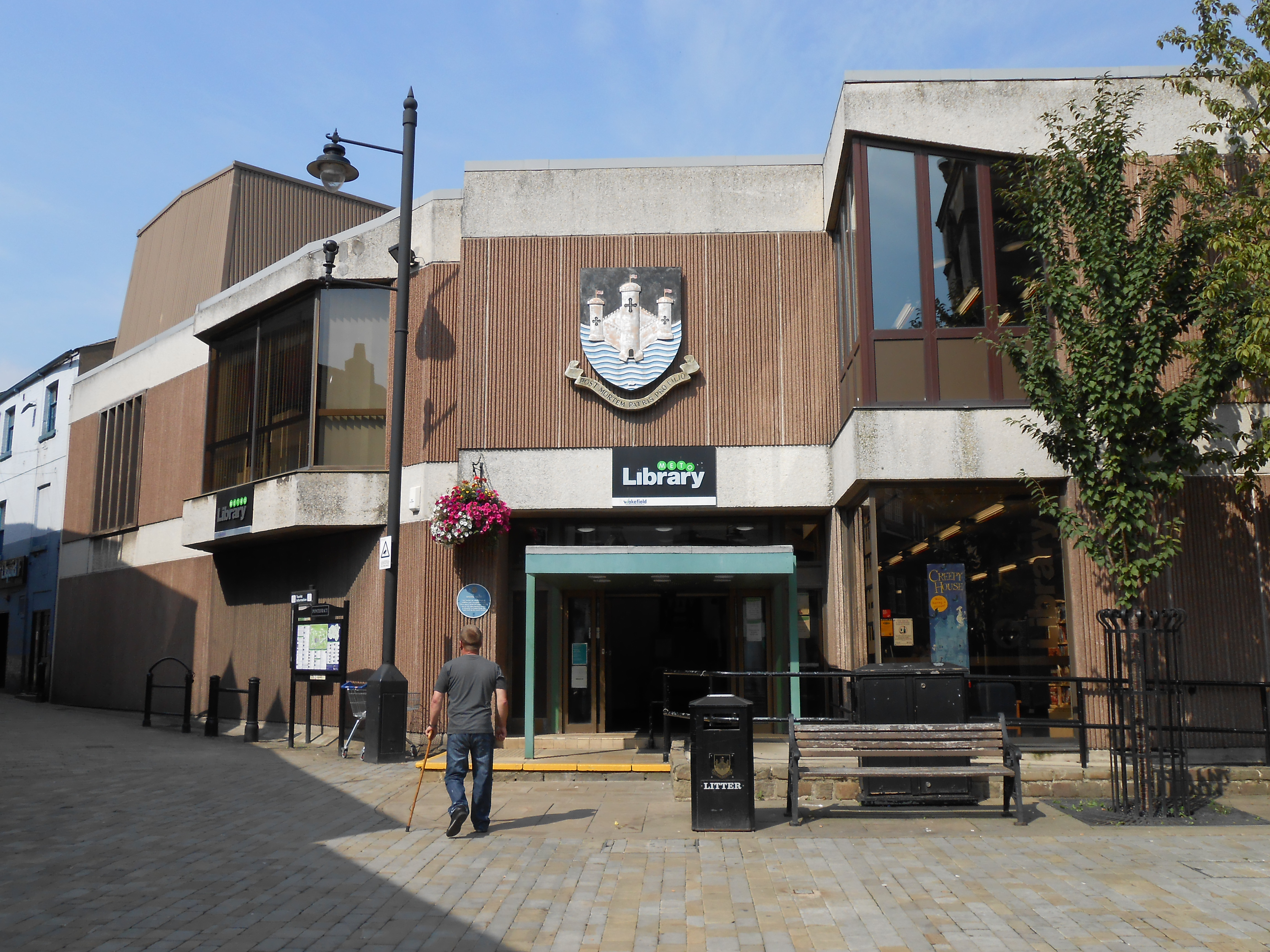
Opening in 1975, Pontefract Library is one of the last buildings to have been designed by local architect John Poulson

- Thurstan of Bayeux (c.1071–1140), archbishop, died in Pontefract.
- Richard de Pontefract (?–1320?), Dominican friar
- John Ramsden (1594–1646), High Sheriff of Yorkshire, MP for Pontefract in the Short Parliament and Royalist soldier
- John Jackson (1595?–1637), MP for Pontefract during the Happy Parliament
- Francis Drake (1696–1771), antiquary and surgeon
- Robert Monckton, (1726–1782), MP for Pontefract and British army general
- John Smyth (1748–1811), MP for Pontefract
- Jesse Hartley (1780–1860), civil engineer and superintendent of the Concerns of the Dock Estate, Liverpool; built the Albert Dock and many other parts of Liverpool Docks
- Charles Coleman (1807–1874), English painter
- Isaac Cole (1886–1940), rugby union and league player who represented England
- Edward Upward (1903–2009), novelist, lived in Pontefract from 2004 until his death in 2009
- Barbara Castle (1910–2002), Labour Party politician
- John Poulson (1910–1993), architectural designer and businessman
- Don Robinson (1932–2017), 1954 Rugby League World Cup winning rugby league footballer who represented Great Britain, Wakefield Trinity, Leeds and Doncaster
- Mal Kirk (1936–1987), wrestler
- Margaret Drabble (1939–), novelist, was evacuated to Pontefract during WW2
- Dr Harold Shipman (1946–2004), serial killer, spent some time working here
- Harvey Proctor (1947–), Conservative MP for Billericay
- Mick Jackson (1947–), musician, writer of "Blame It on the Boogie"
- Kevin Moreton (1959–), actor known for Coronation Street
- Jane Collins (1962–), politician for UKIP and Brexit Party, MEP for Yorkshire (2014–2019)
- Paul Crichton (1968–), former footballer who currently serves as the goalkeeping coach for Huddersfield Town
- Helen Baxendale (1970–), actress known for Cold Feet, Friends and Cuckoo
- Paul Newlove (1971–), English rugby league footballer who played in the 1980s, 1990s and 2000s
- Dave Smith (1971–), professional darts player from Knottingley
- Robert Hanby (1974–), footballer
- Dexter Tucker (1975–), footballer
- Chris Silverwood (1975–), cricketer who represented Yorkshire, Middlesex, and England. Former coach of the England Men's Cricket team
- Darren Appleton (1976-), professional pool player, nine-ball and ten-ball world champion.
- Lee Beachill (1977–), squash player
- Jamie Davis (1981–), actor best known for his roles in Footballers' Wives, Hex and currently in Casualty as Max Walker
- Rob Burrow (1982–2024), former rugby league footballer with Leeds; he also represented both England and Great Britain
- Toby Kebbell (1982–) actor known for "Black Mirror", "RocknRolla", "Dawn of the Planet of the Apes", "Warcraft" and "Kong: Skull Island"
- Jamie McCombe, (1983–), footballer who currently plays for Doncaster Rovers
- Paul Green (1983–), footballer who plays for Oldham in the English Football League
- James Willstrop (1983–) squash player, attended Ackworth School.
- Tim Bresnan (1985–), cricketer who represented Yorkshire, Warwickshire and England
- Ben Parker (1987–), former footballer who played for Leeds United and represented England U19
- Oliver Hindle (1988–), artist and musician, best known for his band project Superpowerless
- Joe Westerman (1989–), rugby league footballer
- Max Litchfield (1995–), swimmer, silver medallist in the 400m medley at the European Long Course Championships
- Joe Litchfield (1998–), swimmer and brother of Max.

== See also ==
- Listed buildings in Pontefract
- Ackworth, West Yorkshire
- Pontefract Hermitage
