= Football in Leeds =

Part of football in the United Kingdom

The city of Leeds, West Yorkshire, United Kingdom, has several Football Clubs within its boundaries. Due to the popularity of rugby league almost all association football clubs in the city have the suffix "A.F.C." instead of the more prevalent "F.C." used in most of England, such as Leeds Woodville A.F.C. who were one of the earliest Victorian teams.

== Men’s football ==
=== Leeds United ===
Leeds United are the only Premier League team in the city of Leeds, with Leeds considered to be England's largest "one-club" city. Leeds United were formed after the original team Leeds City was forcibly disbanded by The Football League in 1919 in response to allegations of financial irregularities regarding illegal payments to players during the First World War.

Though until recently in the EFL Championship, Leeds United are still one of the most successful clubs in English football. In domestic competitions they have won the Football League First Division three times and have been runners-up on five occasions, as well as having won the Second Division three times, and being runners-up a further three times. United have reached the FA Cup Final four times, winning in 1972, the Football League Cup Final twice, winning in 1968, and the Charity Shield three times, winning in 1969 and 1992. In Europe United have been runners-up in the European Cup in 1975 and in the Cup Winners' Cup in 1973. They have won the Inter-Cities Fairs Cup twice, in 1968 and 1971, and were runners-up in 1967.

=== Leeds City ===
Leeds' first professional football club, Leeds City, was formed in 1904, taking the crest of Leeds as the club badge and adopting Blue, Yellow and White as the club's colours. They were elected to the Football League in 1905. Leeds City's whole league career was in the Second Division with Herbert Chapman guiding the club to their highest position of 4th. However, during World War I there ensued a sequence of financial irregularities, including breaking the ban on paying players during the war, that led to the club's dissolution in 1919. They were expelled from The Football League eight games into the 1919–20 season. Port Vale took over their remaining fixtures (as well as their results up to that point). In the wake of their demise, Leeds United were formed, and entered the Football League the following year.

The club did re-form in 1924 as an amateur club, taking part in the Yorkshire Football League, but dissolved in 1927. Currently there is a men's senior team under the name of Leeds City which formed in 2006. They play in the West Yorkshire League Premier Division, level 11 of the English football league system pyramid, 10 levels below where the original club played. There is also a female team using the Leeds City name; Leeds City Vixens L.F.C. (see below). Neither club is recognised as an official continuation of the old club.

=== Guiseley ===
Guiseley A.F.C. are currently the second highest Leeds team in the National League System, playing in Conference North . The club, nicknamed the Lions, were formed sometime in the 1900s. They joined the Yorkshire League in 1968, remaining in this league until 1982–83 when they became founder members of Northern Counties East League. In 1990–91 Guiseley won the FA Vase in a replayed final played at Bramall Lane against Gresley Rovers after a 4–4 draw at Wembley Stadium. This was coupled with the Northern Counties East League title, gaining the club promotion to the Northern Premier League Division One. The club reached the FA Vase Final again in 1992, losing to Wimborne Town, and won the Northern Premier League Division One in 1994. They stayed in the Premier Division until relegation in 2000 but returned to the top division in 2004 and won promotion to Conference North in 2009.

=== Yorkshire Amateur ===
Yorkshire Amateur A.F.C. were formed in Leeds in 1918, around the same time that Leeds City became defunct. Yorkshire Amateur were able to lease City's ground, Elland Road, but by 1920 it was sold to the newly formed Leeds United for £250. The club were one of the original founding members of the Yorkshire Football League in 1920–21, and played at various home grounds, as far away as Harrogate Town at one point. The following year they became the first ever football club from Britain to tour the Eastern European countries of Latvia and Estonia and moved to their current home of Bracken Edge, in Leeds. The most successful year in the club's history was in 1931–32; they reached the FA Cup 1st round going out to Carlisle United 3–1, they reached the semi-finals of the FA Amateur Cup before going out to Marine 2–1 and were crowned champions of the Yorkshire Football League Division Two. Yorkshire Amateur currently play in Northern Counties East League Division One.

=== Garforth Town ===
Garforth Town was formed during 1964 as a pub team called Miners Arms, playing in Swillington. The team joined the West Yorkshire League in 1976, at the same time acquiring their own ground in Garforth. In order to gain election into the Yorkshire League in 1978 the club were forced to change their name to Garforth Miners, pub teams not being allowed in the league. They changed their name again in 1985 to Garforth Town A.F.C. In 2003 the club was bought by Simon Clifford, the man who had brought Brazilian coaching methods to the United Kingdom with his string of ICFDS (International Confederation of Futebol de Salão) footballing academies. Despite the Yorkshire club's low level in the National League System, Garforth gained both national and international press attention at the start of the 2004–05 season with the signing of Brazil legend Sócrates on a one-month deal as a player-coach, he played for Garforth against Tadcaster Albion. The same season, former England and Manchester United winger Lee Sharpe also played for the club. Another former Brazil international, Careca, who came out of retirement and spent time at the club during the 2005–06 season. Garforth currently compete in the Northern Premier League Division One North.

=== Leeds Metropolitan Carnegie ===
Leeds Metropolitan Carnegie F.C. were established in 1970 as Leeds & Carnegie College F.C. and were entered into the Yorkshire Football League. They remained in this league until 1980, when they entered into the Northern Universities League, under the name Leeds Polytechnic. The name of the club was changed to Leeds Met Carnegie during the early part of the 1990s, following the name change of the club's mother institution. In 2004, Leeds Met left the Northern Universities League and rejoined the English football pyramid in the West Yorkshire League. The club won the league's Premier Division in 2005–06, but were not promoted due to their ground being unsuitable. After some re-organising following the 2006–07 season, the club were accepted into the Northern Counties East League Division One courtesy of the club's groundsharing arrangement at Farsley Celtic's Throstle Nest.

== Women's football ==
Leeds City Vixens was started in 1993 as Meanwood Vixens, growing into what is now Leeds City Vixens. The team started in the Sheffield and District Girl's League, winning the U12's, U14's and U16's . The senior team was formed, competing in the Yorkshire & Humberside League, before being promoted in 2003 to the Northern Combination League. They only lasted one season there and were relegated back to the Yorkshire & Humberside League. They won the league at the first attempt and were again promoted, finishing 2nd in their first season back in the Northern Combination. From 2007–08 Vixens groundshare with Yorkshire Amateur A.F.C. as their previous ground was unsuitable.

Leeds United Ladies play in the FA Women's Premier League National Division having previously been promoted from the FA Women's Premier League Northern Division in 2001. They are one of two Yorkshire teams in the national league, along with Doncaster Rovers Belles LFC. Leeds Ladies finished 7th in the league last season (2005–06).

Their first attempt at a major trophy came in 2006 in the FA Women's Cup final against Arsenal L.F.C. Leeds United legend Allan Clarke presented them with sock tags before the match, similar to those worn by the Leeds male team in 1972 Final F.A. Cup victory, in a gesture to give the team luck. The final however did not turn out how the team had hoped with the result ending up 5–0 in Arsenal's favour with centre-back Lucy Ward scoring the opening goal (as an own goal) for Arsenal.

The second attempt at a major trophy came in 2007, also against Arsenal L.F.C. Leeds put in a much better performance than in their previous cup final appearance but cruelly lost out to a last minute strike by Arsenal's Jayne Ludlow (Final Score — Leeds United Ladies 0 – 1 Arsenal Ladies)

After the clubs funding was cut from Leeds United by chairman Ken Bates they managed to survive by using sponsorship money. They were first sponsored by EmpireDirect.co.uk before receiving sponsorship from Leeds Metropolitan University in a deal reported to be worth over £250,000 over 5 years starting in 2007.

The club play their home matches at The Park, the home of Tadcaster Albion A.F.C., in Tadcaster, North Yorkshire having previously played at the home of Garforth Town A.F.C.

Their most notable player is Sue Smith who has played for over 10 years at international level for England, including at the 2007 Women's World Cup.

== See also ==
- Sport in England
- Sport in the United Kingdom
- Sport in Leeds
