= Headingley Stadium =

Sports ground in Leeds, West Yorkshire, England

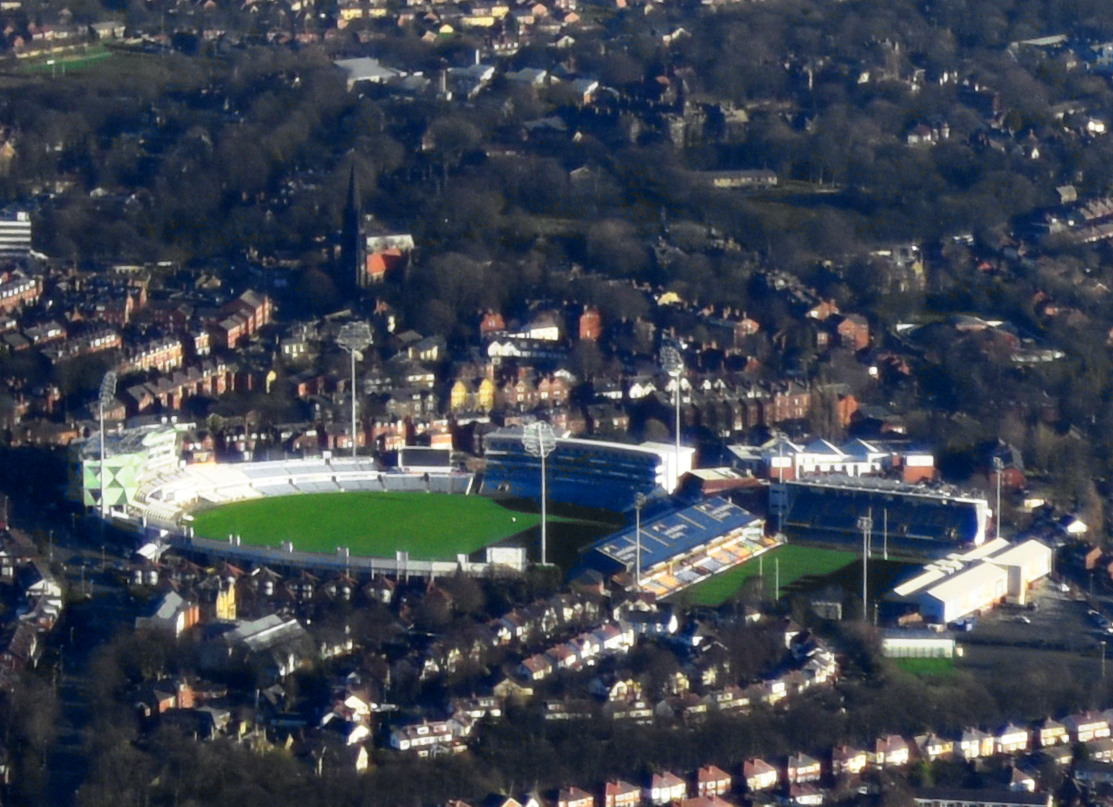
- Interactive map of Headingley Stadium
- Location: Headingley, Leeds, England
- Coordinates: 53°48′59″N 1°34′56″W
- Owner: Leeds Rugby; Yorkshire CCC
- Capacity: 38,050; Rugby stadium (19,700); Cricket ground (18,350)
- Surface: Grass

Construction
- Opened: 1890
- Renovated: 1991, 2011, 2015, 2017–19
- Expanded: 1931, 1932, 2000, 2006, 2010, 2019

Tenants
- Rugby Stadium; Leeds Rhinos (1890–present); Leeds Tykes (1991–2020); Bramley (1997–1999); Cricket Ground; Yorkshire CCC (1891–present)

Headingley Stadium is a stadium complex in Headingley, Leeds, West Yorkshire, England. Linked by a two-sided stand housing common facilities, it comprises two separate grounds: Headingley Cricket Ground (home of Yorkshire CCC) and Headingley Rugby Stadium (home of Leeds Rhinos RLFC).

The stadium was initially owned by the Leeds Cricket, Football, and Athletic Company (Leeds CF & A), the parent company of Leeds RLFC. Since 2006, the cricket ground has been owned by Yorkshire CCC, with the rugby ground retained by Leeds CF & A. The two organisations jointly manage the complex.

== Naming ==
From 2006 until 2017, the stadium was officially known as the Headingley Carnegie Stadium as a result of sponsorship from Leeds Metropolitan University, whose sports faculty is known as the Carnegie School of Sport Exercise and Physical Education. Between 1 November 2017 and 3 November 2021, the stadium was known as the Emerald Headingley Stadium due to the purchase of the naming rights by Emerald Group Publishing. The Emerald Group later withdrew their sponsorship of the ground effective immediately on 3 November 2021 due to Yorkshire County Cricket Club's alleged insufficient response to allegations of racism made by former player Azeem Rafiq. In 2023, Rugby League team Leeds Rhinos announced the "biggest commercial deal" in their history with a 15-year partnership with AMT Auto for the naming rights to the rugby stadium. The deal with the Leeds-based vehicle solutions company means the club's stadium is now known as the AMT Headingley Rugby Stadium since 1 December 2023. It is only the fourth time in the 133-year history of the stadium that the club have allowed naming rights.

== Cricket ground ==
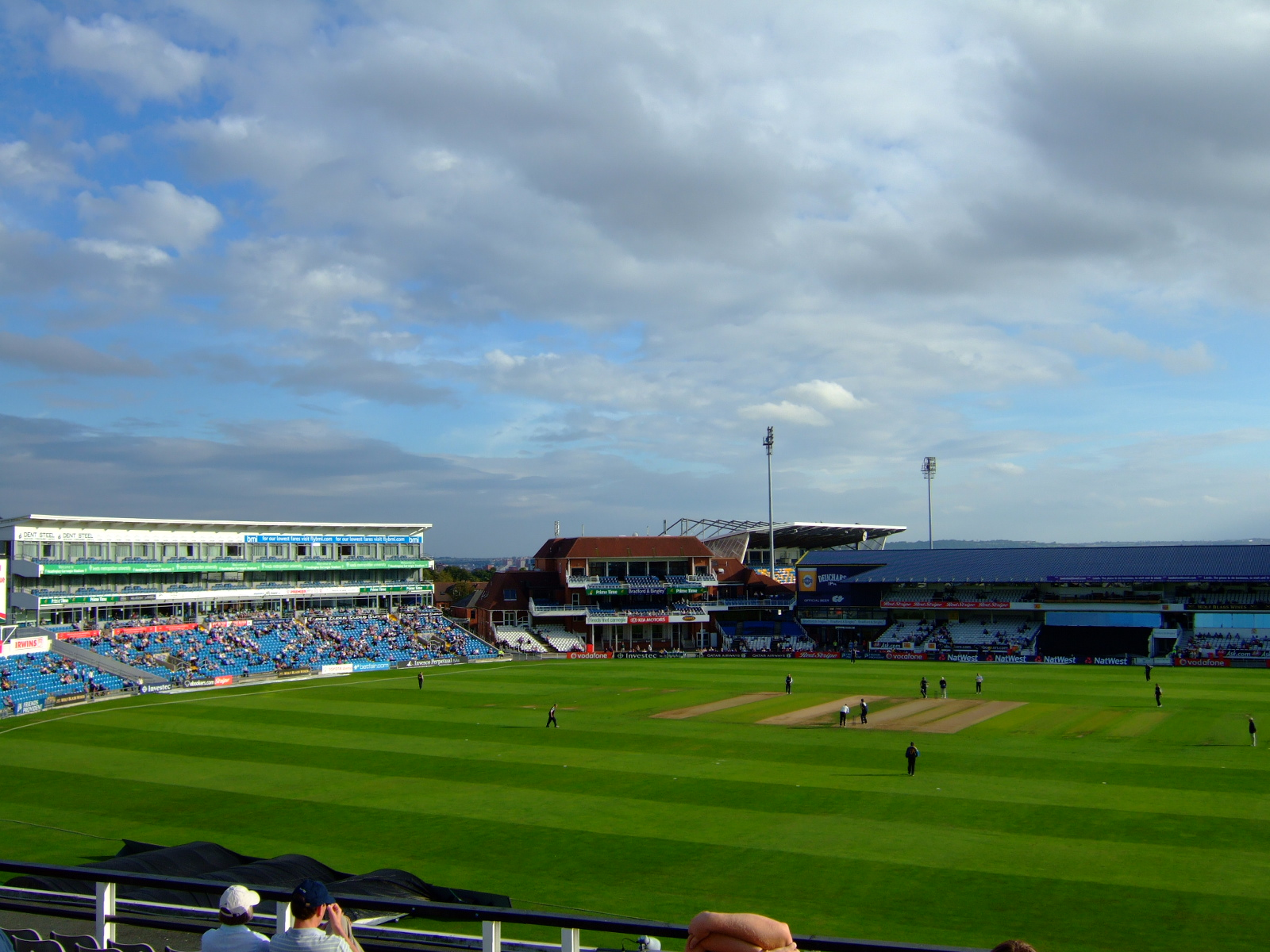
The cricket ground in 2006

The cricket ground sits on the northern side of the complex. It opened in 1891 and has been used for Test matches since 1899. The ground has also staged one day internationals and Twenty20 internationals. It is the main home ground of the Yorkshire County Cricket Club and the Northern Superchargers Hundred franchise. The venue last hosted The Ashes in 2023. Floodlights were installed at the ground in 2015. It has a seating capacity of 18,350, executive facilities, and opened a new media centre in 2010. Since 2000, all sections of the cricket ground have been rebuilt.

=== Owning the ground ===
In December 2005, Yorkshire County Cricket Club obtained a loan of £9 million from Leeds City Council towards the cost of purchasing the cricket ground for £12 million. Shortly afterwards, 98.37% of members who participated in a vote backed the deal.In 29 years, the owners of the stadium have renovated 5 times. On 11 January 2006, the club announced plans to rebuild the stand next to the rugby ground with 3,000 extra seats, taking capacity to 20,000. The club also announced plans to redevelop the Winter Shed (North) stand on 25 August 2006 providing a £12.5 million pavilion complex.

== Rugby ground ==
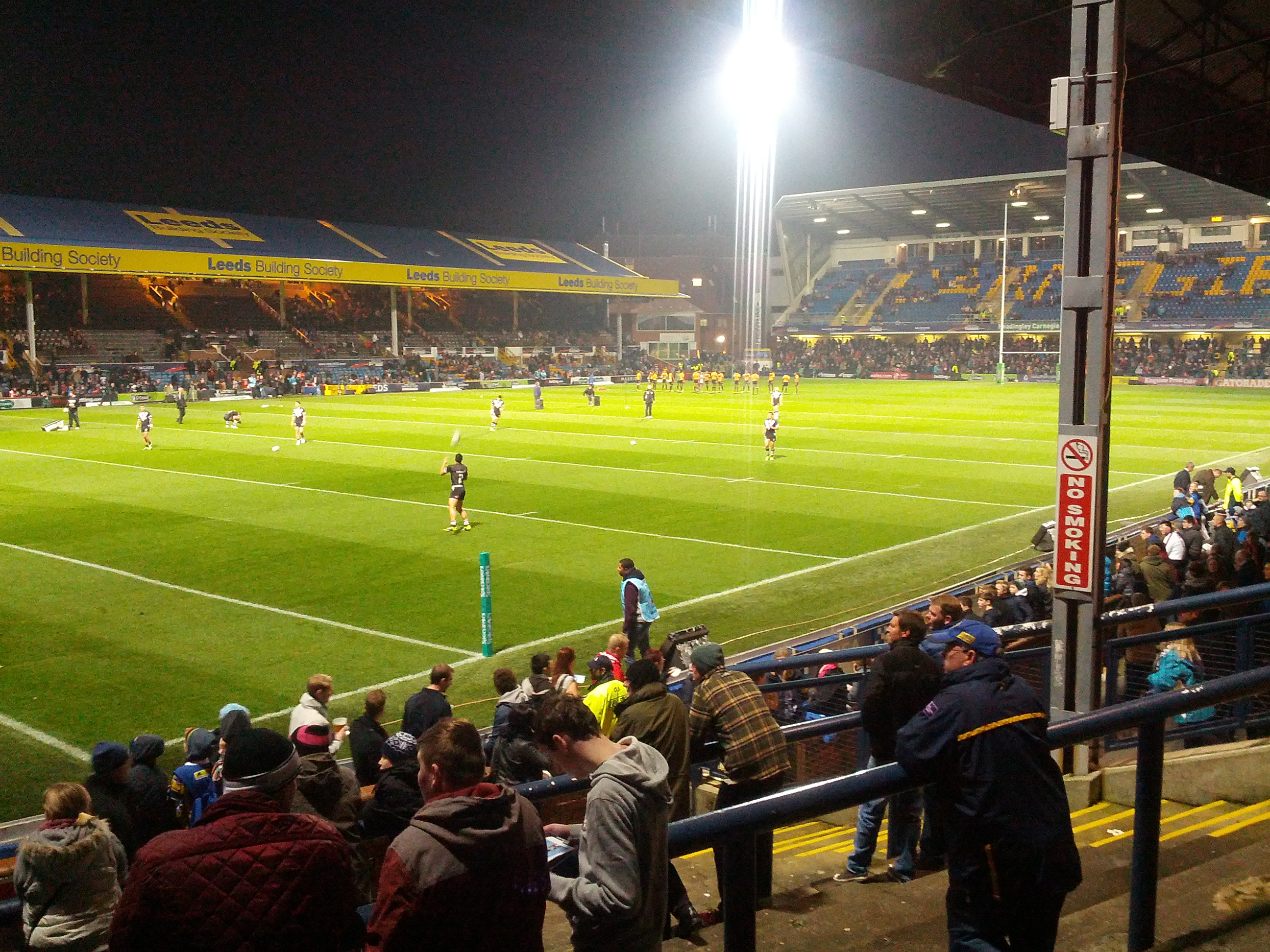
Headingley rugby ground

The rugby ground sits on the southern side of the complex. Historically a rugby league ground, the home of Leeds Rhinos, it now hosts some rugby union games. The team has also won 11 League Championships, the Challenge Cup 14 times and the World Club Challenge 3 times. The venue consists of three stands and an open terrace at one end. One stand is completely seated, and two are a mixture of seating and standing. The stadium has a capacity of 20,112.

In 2018, a new, modern South Stand, sponsored by brewer Tetley's, was opened. A new North Stand, the Emerald Stand, was opened in 2019.

== Recent and future developments ==
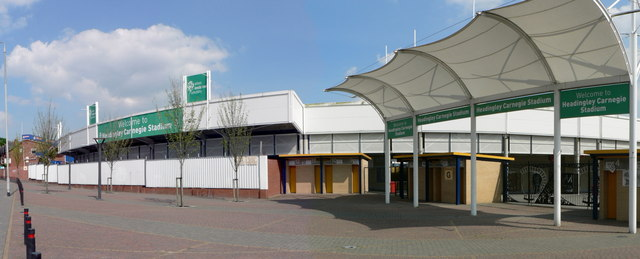
North Stand and entrance

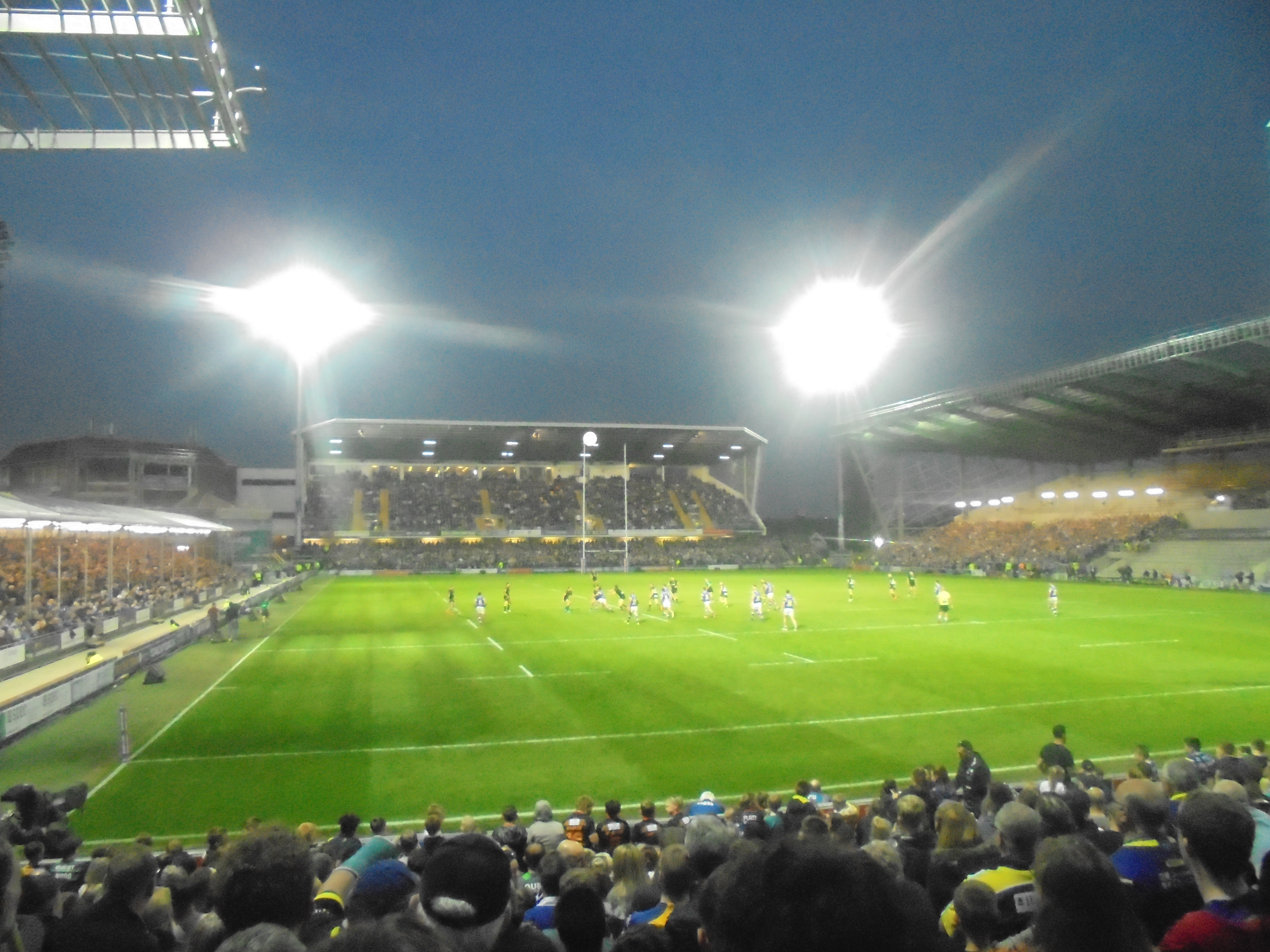
Redevelopment on the rugby side of the ground

On 5 June 2014 Yorkshire CCC announced the "Headingley Masterplan". The phased redevelopment costing around £50 million will take place over the next 20 years. The plan sought to cement the future of the cricket ground as a major international venue in the face of competition from rival venues.

- Phase One (Completed) – Erection of four permanent floodlight pylons. The floodlights, which have light arrays in the shape of the Yorkshire Rose, were installed in 2015. The first full game to be played under them was the T20 match against Derbyshire Falcons on Friday, 15 May 2015, but they were also called upon for the County Championship game against Warwickshire a few weeks earlier.
- Phase Two (Completed) – The redeveloped Football Ground End (currently called the Howard Stand), was built in conjunction with Leeds Rugby and opened in 2019. It incorporates a three-tiered seating area, with a capacity of 4,200 (with a further 3,800 seats in the adjoining rugby stand), enhanced corporate facilities and new permanent concession units.
- Phase Three – To incorporate an additional 915 seats to the upper tier of the North East Stand with the possibility of a cantilever roof from the side of the Carnegie Pavilion to the existing scoreboard.
- Phase Four – The development of a new Pavilion located in the North West area of the stadium complex. Built on five levels, the Pavilion will be adjacent to the existing Carnegie Pavilion. To include corporate facilities, new dressing rooms for the players and coaching staff, Members' Long Room and seating and the creation of a main entrance to the stadium on Kirkstall Lane.
- Phase Five – The erection of a translucent cantilever roof to cover the Western Terrace.
- Phase Six – Landscaping on the Western Terrace and North East stand concourses.

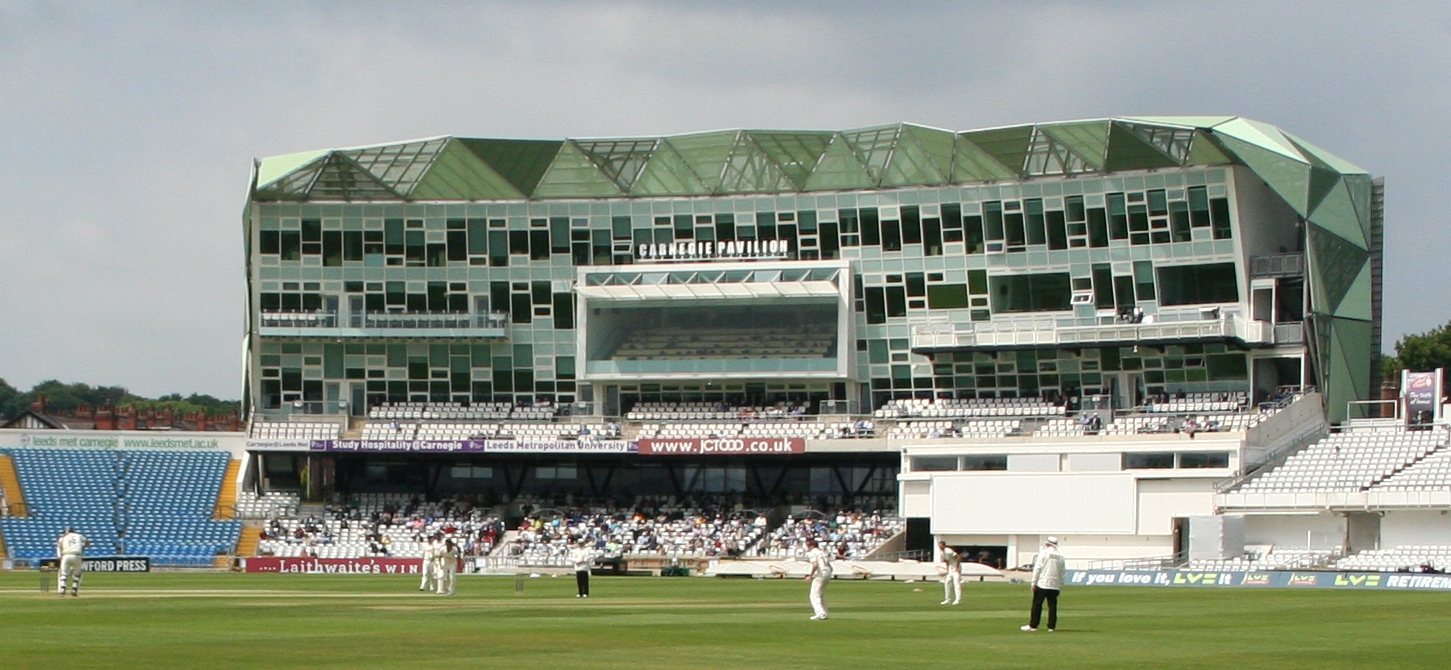
The Clean Slate Pavilion

Yorkshire County Cricket Club and Leeds Metropolitan University have collaborated in building the Headingley Carnegie Pavilion, which replaced 'The Shed' (the oldest surviving structure dating from the early 1970s) to the northern side of the Cricket Ground. The new pavilion replaces 'The Winter Shed' and 'The Media Centre' at the Kirkstall Lane end of the ground, which had become obsolete, according to Yorkshire County Cricket Club, as they no longer met the requirements of modern broadcasting. The changing facilities have been replaced by new facilities, designed specifically for cricket, while the new executive boxes will provide the expected level of service. Yorkshire County Cricket Clubs offices will also be relocated into the pavilion, which boasts environmentally friendly features such as a ground source heat pump and solar hot water heating.

The rugby ground has also been significantly rebuilt since the 2006 opening of the Carnegie Stand at the east end, which contained both standing and seated areas, private boxes and catering. In 2017 both the North and South Stands were torn down following Leeds' last home game of the season: the new South Stand is a two-tier structure similar to the East Stand with an expanded terrace for 5,500 and seating behind for 2,200, while the North Stand's replacement features 3,800 seats, additional executive boxes and facilities for players, staff and media, as well as 4,200 seats for the cricket ground.

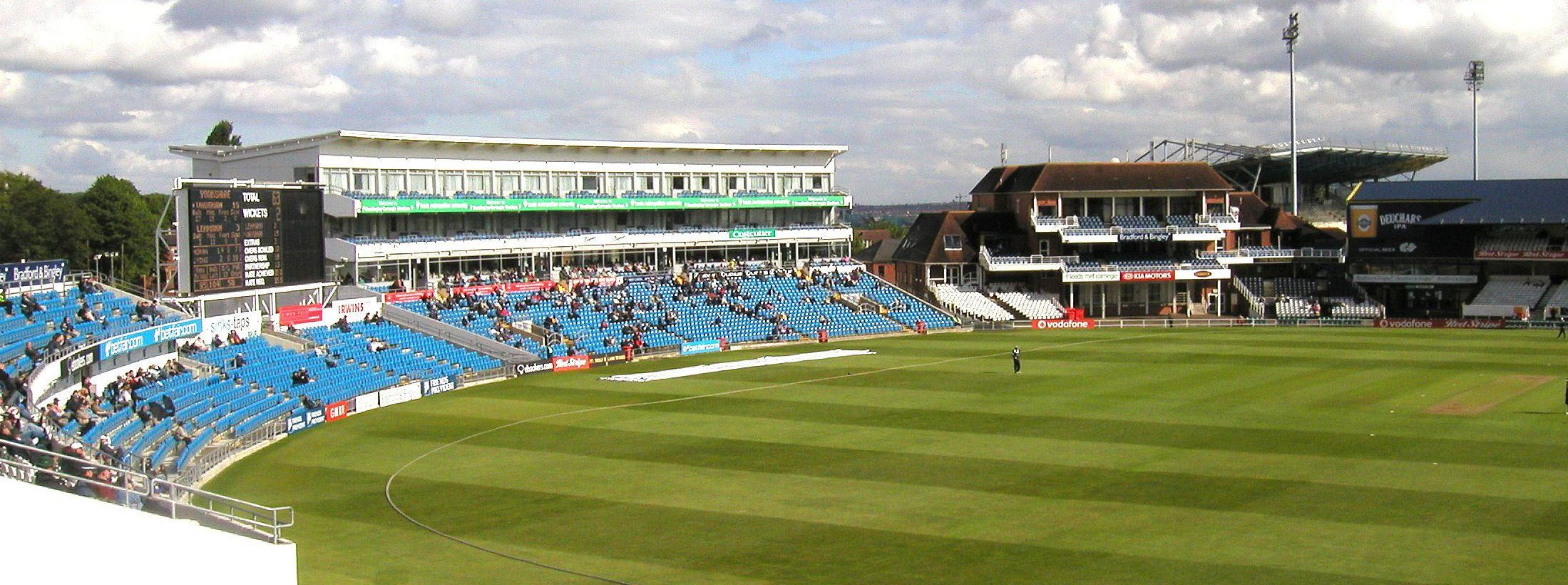
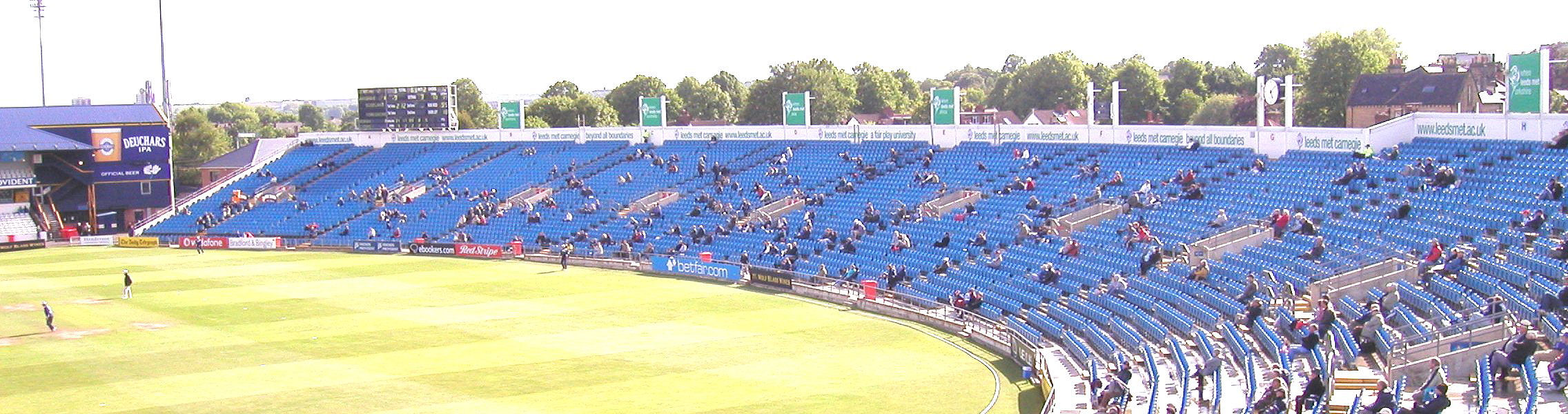

== Gallery ==
=== Cricket Ground ===
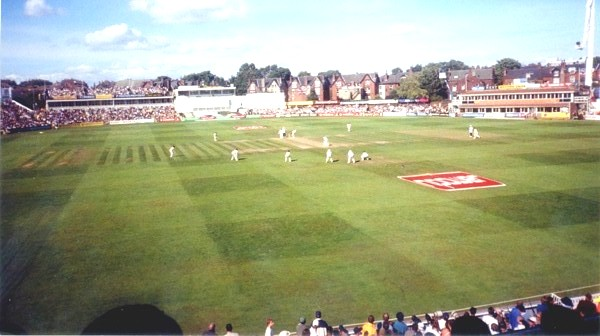
England v. Australia 4th Test, 2001

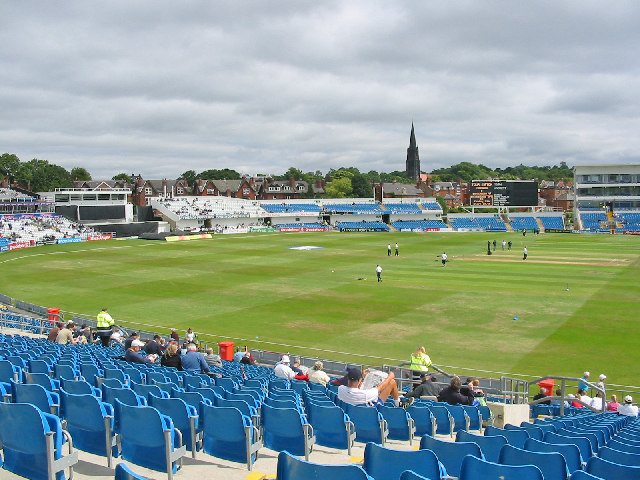
The Kirkstall Lane End

=== Rugby Stadium ===
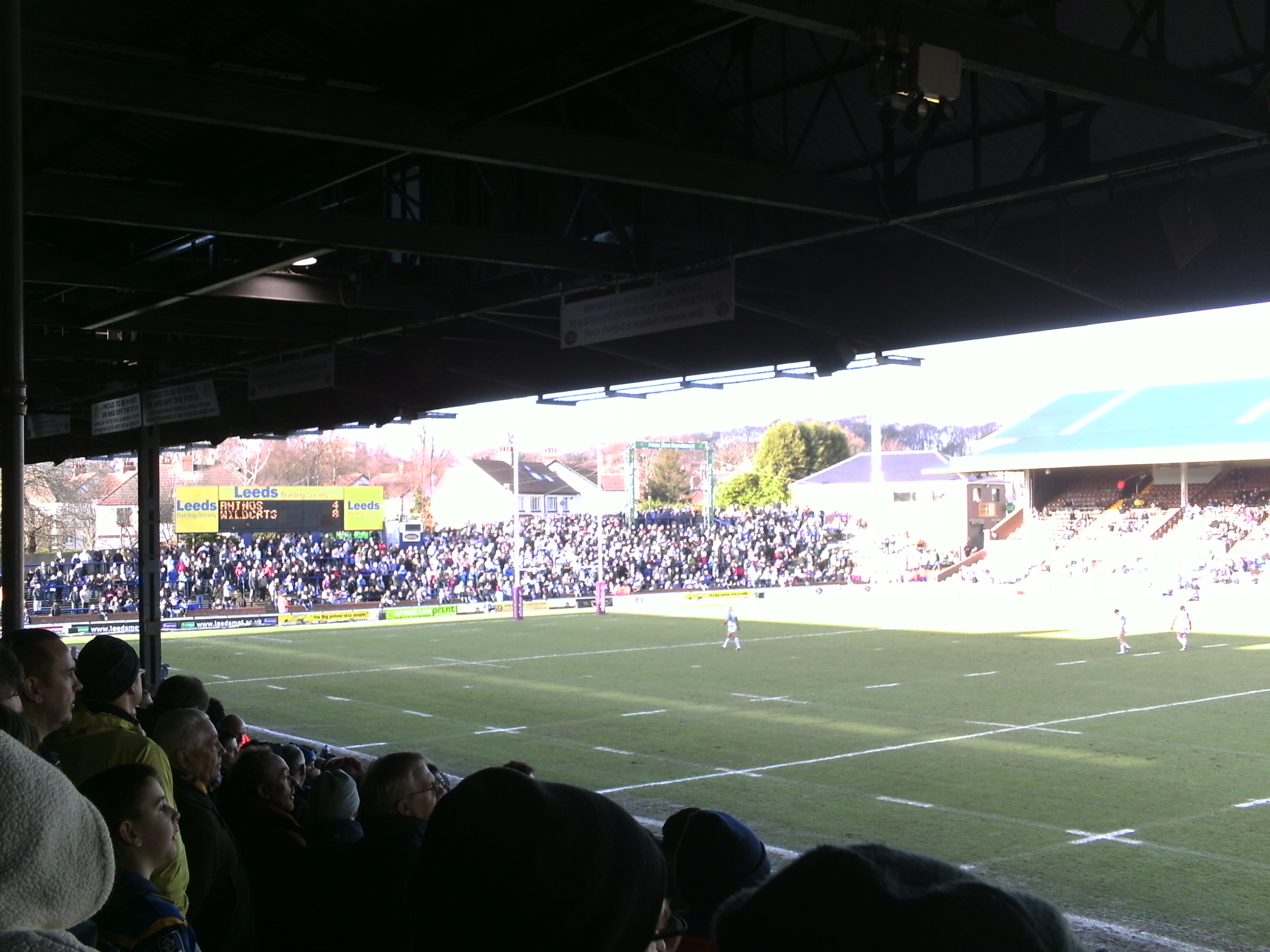
Western Terraces

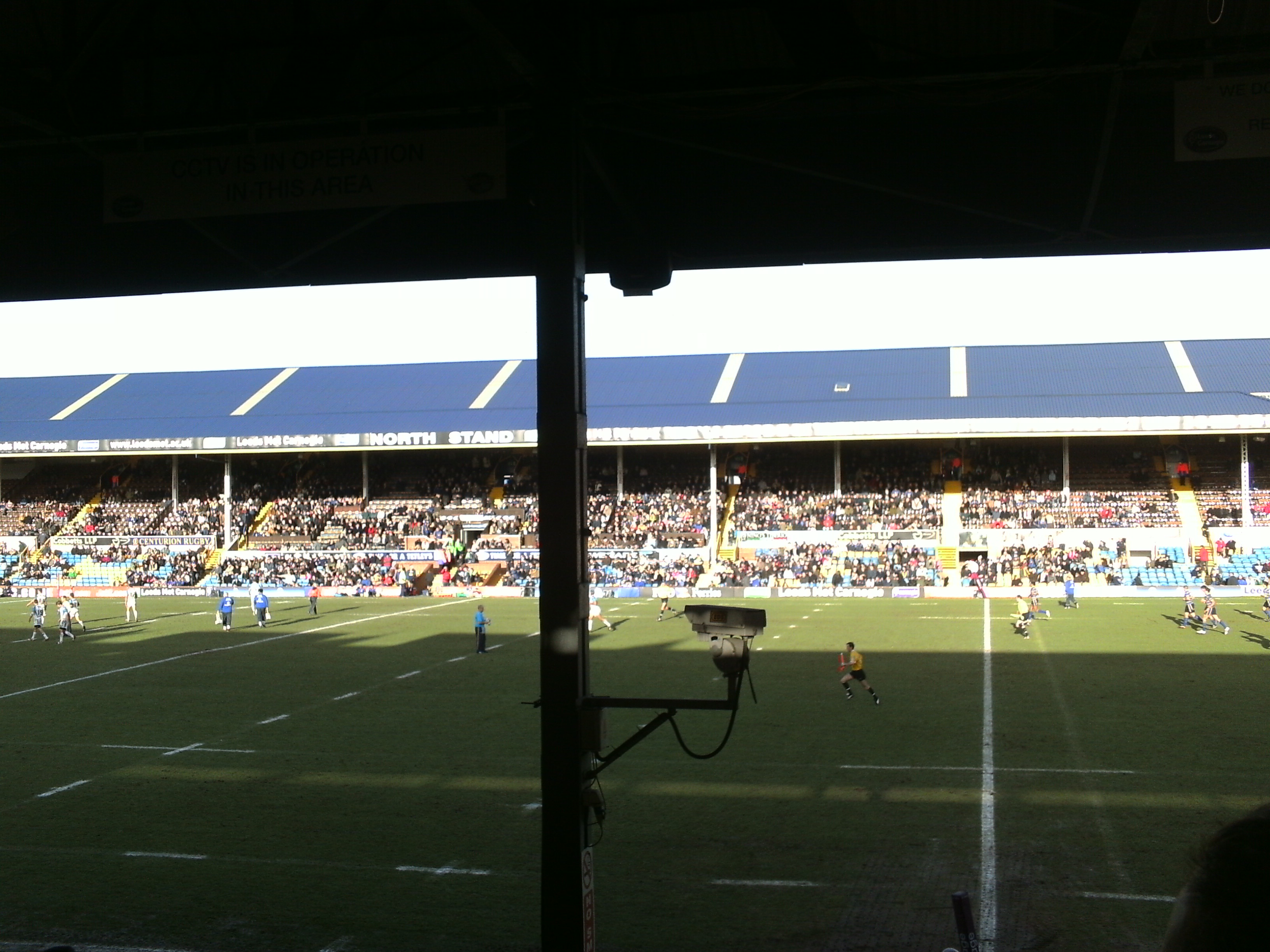
North Stand

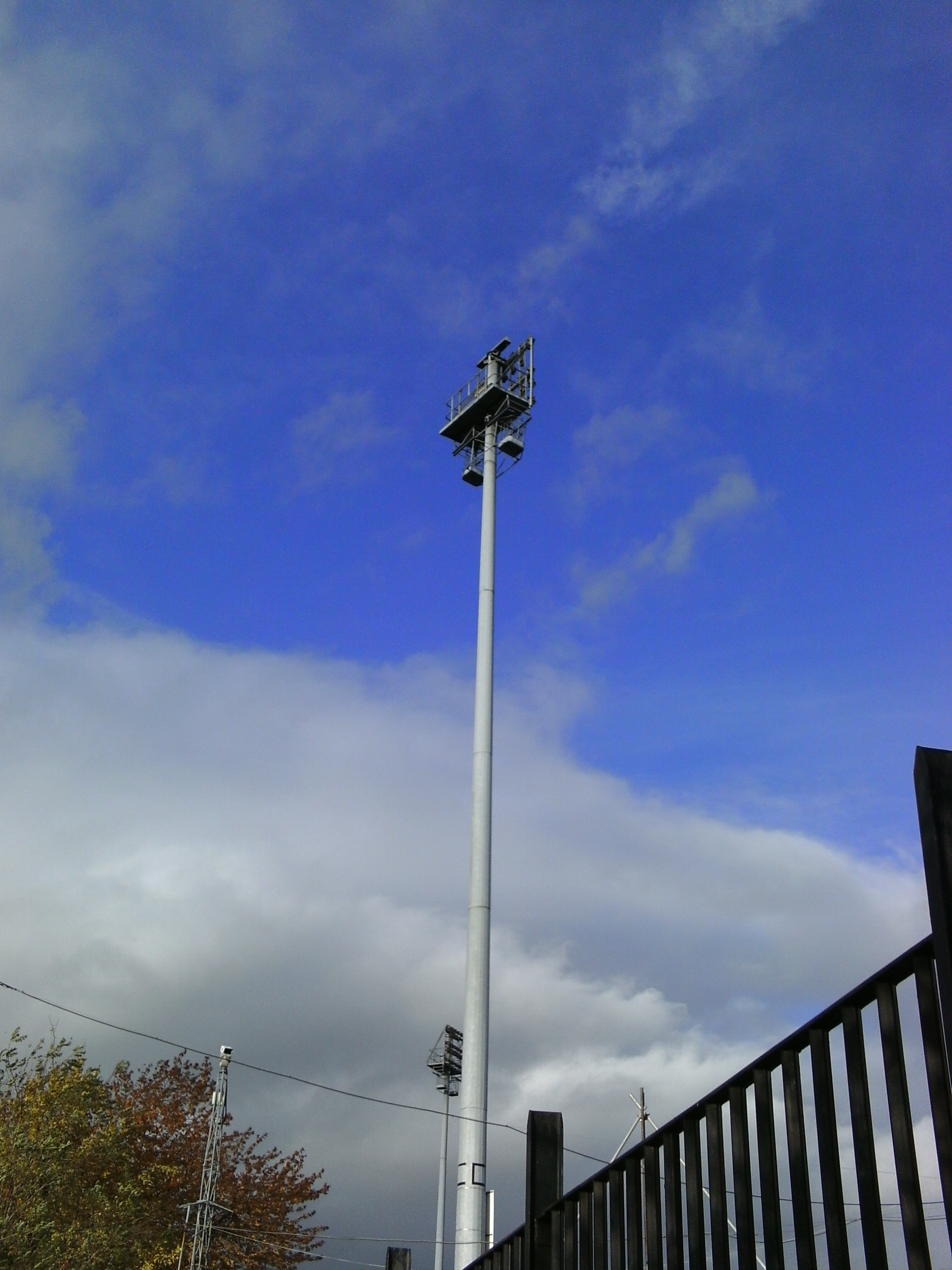
Floodlight Column 'C'

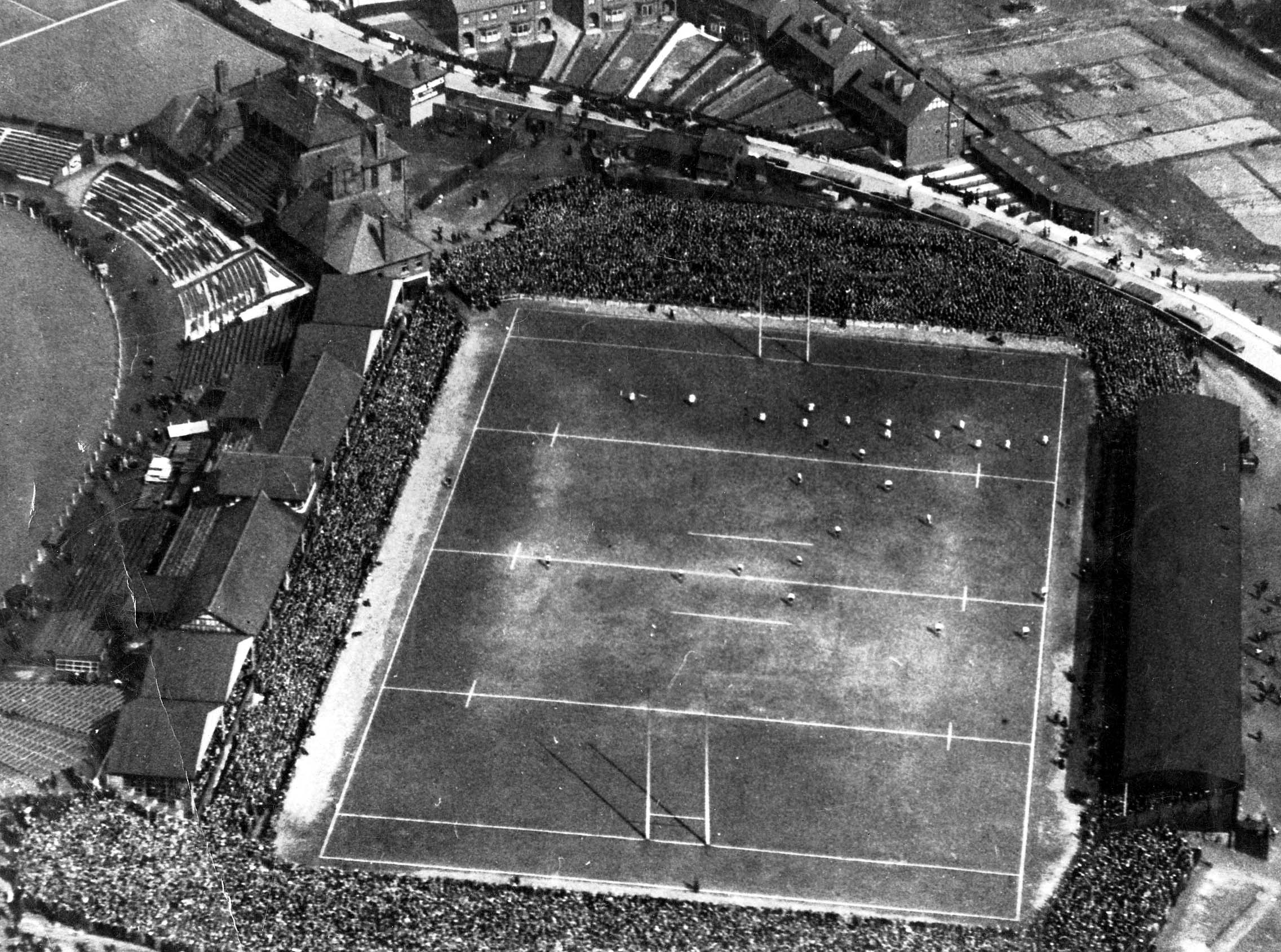
Aerial view of the rugby ground around 1925

== See also ==
- Architecture of Leeds
- Cricket (musical)
- List of cricket grounds in England and Wales
- List of Test cricket grounds
- Sport in Leeds
