= Sport in Leeds =

Leeds has a strong sporting heritage, with the Yorkshire County Cricket Club and Leeds Rhinos (the rugby league team) playing at Headingley Stadium, Leeds Tykes (the rugby union team) playing at The Sycamores, Bramhope and Leeds United F.C. playing at Elland Road. The Headquarters of the Rugby Football League is also based in Leeds. Leeds City Council also offer a wide variety of sport, leisure and fitness sessions both in their leisure centres and the community.

== Teams based in Leeds ==
=== Cricket ===
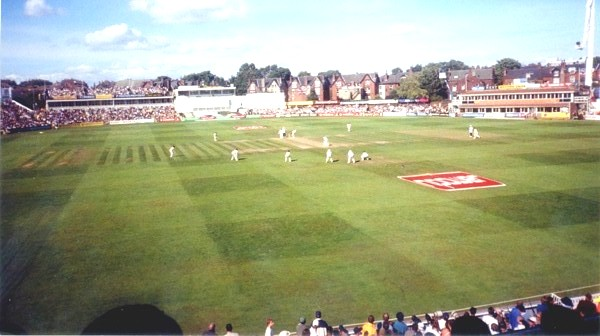
England v Australia 4th Test 2001

Yorkshire County Cricket Club have played most of their games at Headingley Stadium, Leeds since 1888. Yorkshire are the most successful side in County Championship history, having won the title a record 31 times. Yorkshire has a storied history, and has produced many successful cricketers who have gone on to become England internationals, including Geoff Boycott, Michael Vaughan, Fred Trueman, Darren Gough and Matthew Hoggard. Seven members of the current Yorkshire side are present or former England internationals, Tim Bresnan, Ryan Sidebottom, Joe Root, Gary Ballance, Jonny Bairstow, Adil Rashid and Liam Plunkett. In addition, some of the most famous names in world cricket have played for the county, including Sachin Tendulkar, current Australia Coach Darren Lehmann and current Yorkshire team coach and former Australian international Jason Gillespie.

In addition, Test match cricket has been played at Headingley since 1899. The stadium has also been used in several ICC Competitions including the Cricket World Cup.

=== Football ===
==== Association ====
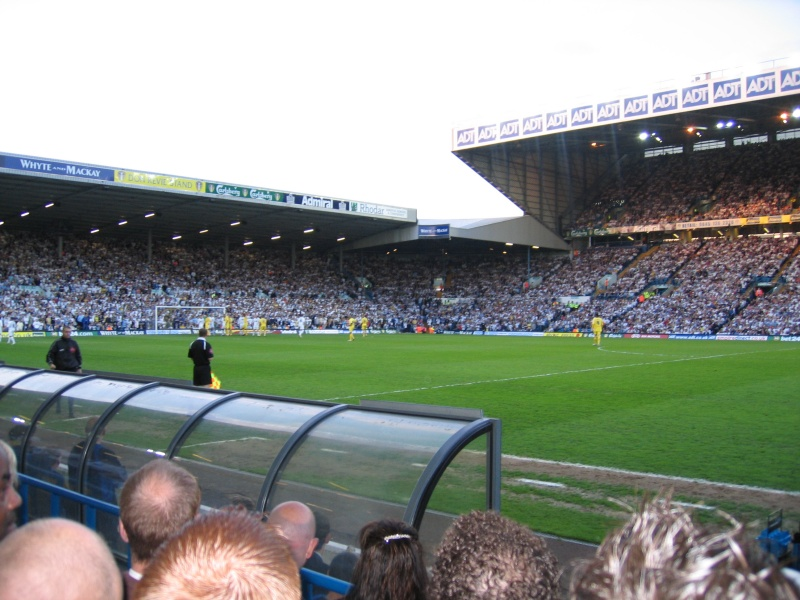
Elland Road hosts the play off semi-final against Preston in 2006

In the early 20th Century Leeds was known as a rugby town. The first football team to bear the name of the city were called Leeds City F.C. However, this team was disqualified from the league for financial breaches. In 1919 Leeds United F.C. were formed. Unlike many northern cities such as Manchester and Sheffield, Leeds has just one football league team, being the city with the largest population to have just one team in the top four divisions of English football (the Premier League and the three leagues comprising The Football League).

Leeds United played the 2007–08 season in Football League One, the third level of the English league system; this was the first time since the club's election to The Football League in 1920 that they have played outside the top two divisions. They were relegated from the second-level Football League Championship as a direct result of a 10-point deduction for going into administration. They entered the Championship in 2004, when a financial crisis and loss of key players cost them their Premiership status and almost put them out of business. They were promoted back to the Premier League in 2020 following a sixteen-year absence, after winning the Championship the previous season. Leeds United's greatest successes came under the leadership of manager Don Revie in the late 1960s, and 1970s, when they were league champions twice as well as winning the League Cup, FA Cup and European Fairs Cup. They also won the league title in 1992, when Howard Wilkinson was manager, the team's last major top flight trophy. There is also an affiliated Ladies team Leeds United L.F.C. whose closest chance at silverware was in the 2006 FA Women's Cup, losing to Arsenal L.F.C.

Farsley Celtic AFC are a non-league football team from the Farsley district of West Leeds, and play their home games at Throstle Nest. Another non-league team in Leeds is Garforth Town, who play in East Leeds, plus Guiseley A.F.C. who play in the National League North, the team are most known for their back to back appearances in the second round of the FA Cup.

Leeds United Women F.C. are an English women's football club in the FA Women's National Premier League. They play at Farsley Celtic's Throstle Nest ground, having previously played at Tadcaster Albion's ground, The Park.

Leeds City Vixens L.F.C. play in the Northern Combination Women's Football League and last season the finished 2nd in the league. They moved ground from Adel Memorial to The Bracken Edge the same ground as Yorkshire Amateur A.F.C.

==== Rugby league ====
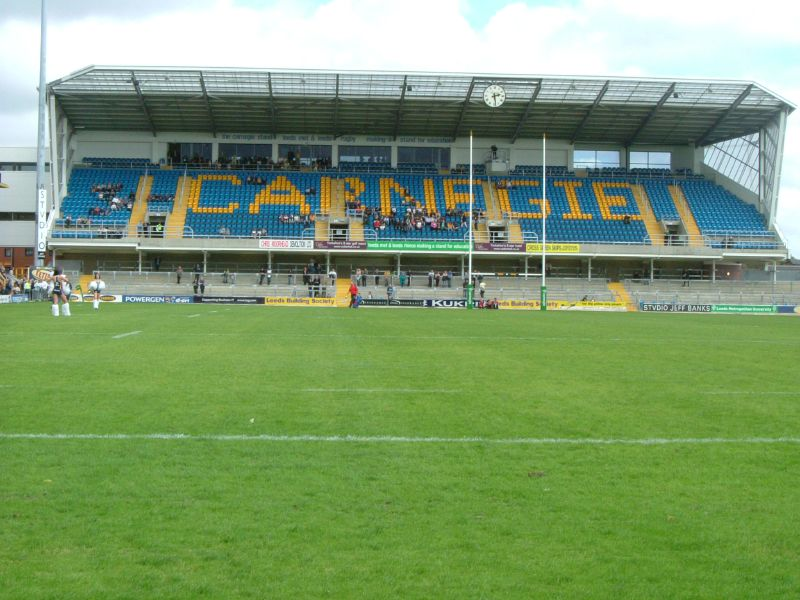
The new south stand of the rugby ground

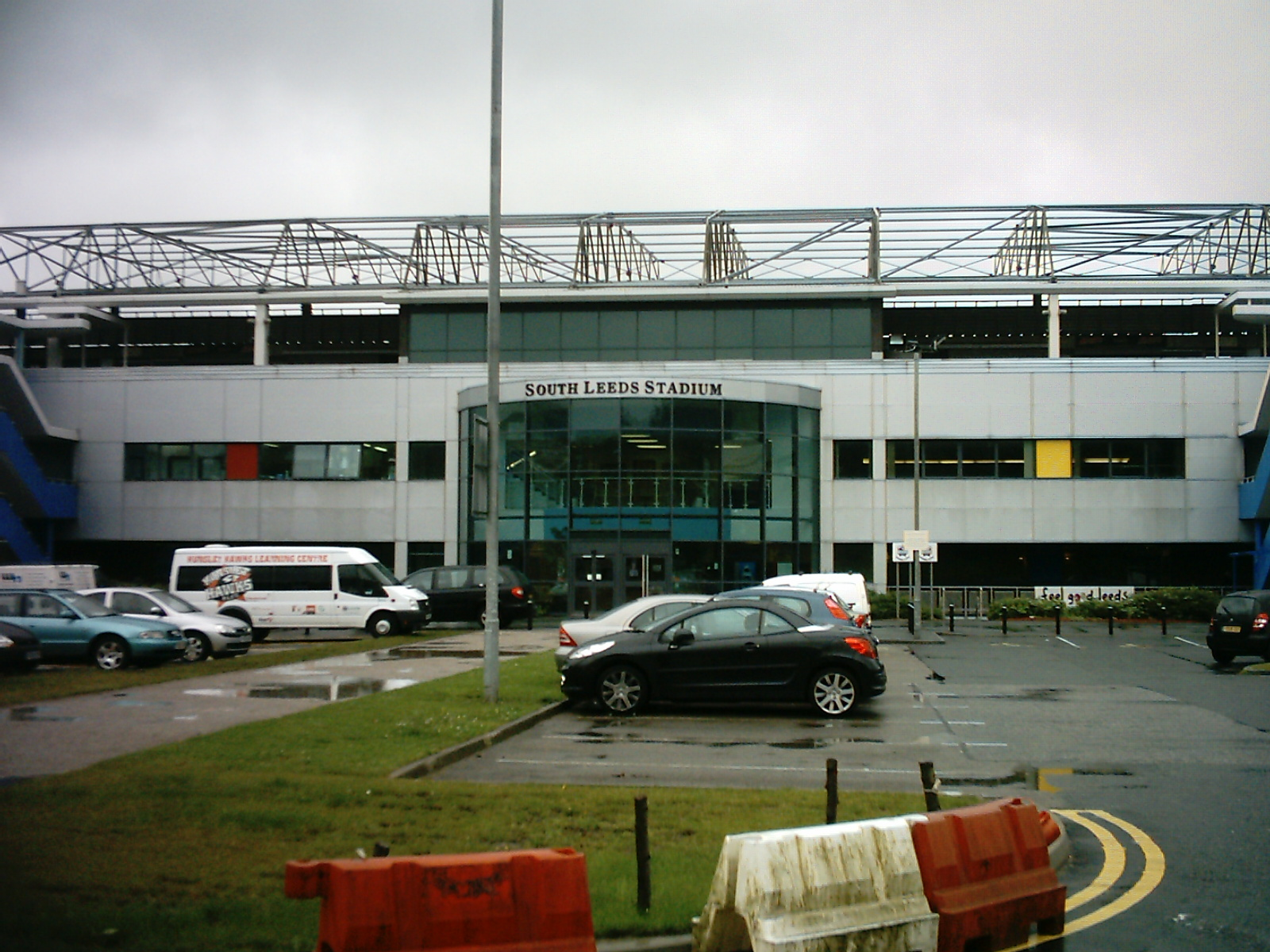
South Leeds Stadium, home of Hunslet

Founded as Leeds St. Johns in 1895 the club is now known as the Leeds Rhinos have a long history. In recent years the team has competed in several major finals. Under coach Graham Murray they competed in the first Super League grand final in 1998 but were defeated by Wigan Warriors. A year later Leeds won the Rugby League Challenge Cup, defeating London Broncos at Wembley in the last final held at Wembley stadium before its re-building. After several years without a trophy the appointment of Tony Smith of coach saw Leeds top the league at the end of the season and went on to be crowned Super League champions on 16 October 2004 after defeating arch rivals Bradford Bulls 16–8 at Old Trafford. In 2005 the Rhinos reached the final of both the Challenge Cup and the Super League but lost both games to Hull F.C. and Bradford Bulls respectively. Leeds now hold the 2007 crown after thrashing former champions St Helens 33–6 in the Grand Final. This was Coach Tony Smith's final game before leaving to be G.B coach and this win makes it two grand final trophies in four years. They won the next two super league grand finals, topping the regular season league table in the latter, setting a record for the most consecutive grand final wins. They also won the crown in 2011, coming from 5th place after the regular season rounds. The team reached the challenge cup final for the first time at the redeveloped Wembley Stadium in 2010, and then again in 2011, losing out 6–30 to the Warrington Wolves and then 18–28 to Wigan Warriors. Leeds Rhinos are the best supported Rugby League club in the United Kingdom, their Headingley ground holds up to 20,500 spectators and is regularly filled, with sell out's particularly common, at games against Bradford Bulls, St. Helens and Wigan Warriors. Leeds-based Tetley's Bitter, Leeds Building Society, Jet2 and Leeds Carnegie are all major sponsors of the Leeds Rhinos.

Hunslet (previously New Hunslet, and Hunslet Hawks) are a rugby league team based in the Beeston district of South Leeds. They were formed in Hunslet in May 1883 as Hunslet F.C. with the merger of two local teams. They were the first club to win All Four Cups, which they did in the 1907–08 season. Hunslet currently play in League One, and now play at the John Charles Centre for Sport (previously the South Leeds Stadium) in Beeston, Leeds. They were relegated from the Championship in the 2015 season.

Bramley RLFC were a rugby league team based in the Bramley district of West Leeds, they were founded in 1879. At the end of the 1999 season Bramley resigned from the Northern Ford Premiership to become a feeder team for Leeds Rhinos, but this never materialised. They were reformed as Bramley Buffaloes, a supporter-owned club.

There are numerous British Amateur Rugby League Association teams based in Leeds. East Leeds and Oulton Raiders currently play in the top division of the National Conference League. Rugby League is also played at many secondary schools in the Leeds district as well.

Leeds Carnegie (part of Leeds Metropolitan University) sponsor the Challenge Cup as well as Headingley Stadium, they have become one of the biggest sponsors in British sport outside of Football.

==== Rugby union ====
Leeds Tykes were founded in 1991 as Leeds RUFC after the merger of Roundhay and Headingley and played their first match on 1 September 1992 against Hull Ionians. In 1998, after the club amalgamated with Leeds Rhinos, it took the name Leeds Tykes. The club won their first ever trophy in 2005 with battling performance to defeat huge favourites Bath in the Powergen Cup final. However the team's fortunes declined and in 2006 they were relegated from the Guinness Premiership. After one season in National Division One they won promotion back to the top flight of rugby union.

Shortly after the end of the 2006–07 season, Leeds Metropolitan University bought a 51% stake in the club and renamed it Leeds Carnegie, after the university's sport faculty of Carnegie College. The club was since re-branded again as Yorkshire Carnegie before returning to Leeds Tykes.

==== American ====
The Yorkshire Rams are Leeds' oldest American football team, having been founded in 1987. They are based at South Leeds Stadium and currently play in the BAFA Division One North.

Since 2012, Leeds Bobcats have been based in Farnley.

Leeds also has two flag football teams, Leeds Samurai and Leeds Tornadoes; a women's full contact team, Leeds Chargers; two University teams, Leeds Beckett Carnegie and Leeds Gryphons; and an academy set up, the Yorkshire Academy of American Football.

=== Hockey ===
Leeds is home to a number of field hockey clubs that compete in the North Hockey League and Yorkshire Hockey Association League. These include Leeds Hockey Club, Leeds Adel Hockey Club, the University of Leeds Hockey Club and Leeds Beckett University Hockey Club. Leeds Hockey Club Men's 1s gained promotion at the end of the 2016/2017 season to become Leeds' first hockey team competing in a National League. Leeds also has a professional ice hockey team, Leeds Knights who play at Planet Ice Arena at Elland Road.

=== Diving ===
Leeds has some of the best diving facilities in the UK. The main club, City of Leeds Diving Club, who train at John Charles Centre for Sport, have produced some of the best divers in Britain, with many going on to be selected for Team GB and competing at an international and Olympic level. Leeds is also responsible for Great Britain's first ever diving Olympic champions: Jack Laugher and Chris Mears, who won the gold medal at the 2016 Rio Olympics. Other successful Leeds-trained divers include Rebecca Gallantree, Dan Goodfellow, Matty Lee, Lois Toulson, Alicia Blagg and Jamaican diver Yona Knight-Wisdom.

=== Swimming ===
Primarily based at the John Charles Aquatic Center in Leeds, East Leeds Swimming club which is often referred to as the "Northern Powerhouse" of British Masters swimming is one of the premier swimming clubs in the country. Originating as a local feeder club into the City of Leeds swimming club programme the club has grown into an independent and highly successful individual entity that specializes in Senior and Masters swimming. East Leeds Swimming club provides a training environment for many Leeds swimmers looking to train for pool, open water and triathlon events. Currently the ranks of the club boast multiple British, European, Commonwealth and World Champions as well as record holders at each level also. In recent years the senior section of the club has begun to punch above its weight on the National Championship stage, most recently culminating in multiple relay medals at the 2019 Swim England Winter Championships.

=== Athletics ===
Leeds City AC is amongst the biggest and most successful athletics clubs in the Northern England and has had the most successful men's harriers section in the country in the 21st century. Since the turn of the millennium the team has never been out of the top 4 in the National Cross Country Championships, winning in 2003 and 2006. In 2006 the team achieved the 'Grand Slam' of wins - Yorkshire, North of England and English National Champions.

=== Climbing ===
Leeds has a well-established climbing and mountaineering scene. The Yorkshire Ramblers’ Club, England’s second oldest mountaineering club, was founded in Headingley in 1892, and the city is also home to Leeds Mountaineering Club, as well as climbing clubs at the University of Leeds and Leeds Beckett University.

The UK’s first artificial climbing wall for training and developing technique was established at the University of Leeds in 1964. More recently, Leeds has hosted the BMC’s British Bouldering Championships, and the Youth Climbing Series Grand Final. Team GB climbers Hamish McArthur and Molly Thompson-Smith are trained by Mark Glennie and Ellie Glennie at Precision Climbing in the city.

=== Bowls ===
Leeds is also a home to Crown Green Bowls and they have several leagues in the city.

== Sports facilities and stadia in Leeds ==
Leeds has a wealth of sports facilities including the 40,000-capacity Elland Road football stadium, a host stadium at UEFA Euro 1996; the 22,000-capacity Headingley Rugby Stadium, world-famous for both cricket and rugby league; and South Leeds Stadium used for athletics, bowls, football, rugby league and tennis. Other facilities include the Leeds Wall (climbing), Xscape (real snow indoor ski and snowboard slope with ice climbing wall) and Yeadon Tarn, sailing centre.

Leeds' 50 metre international swimming pool has now being demolished.

=== Horse Racing ===
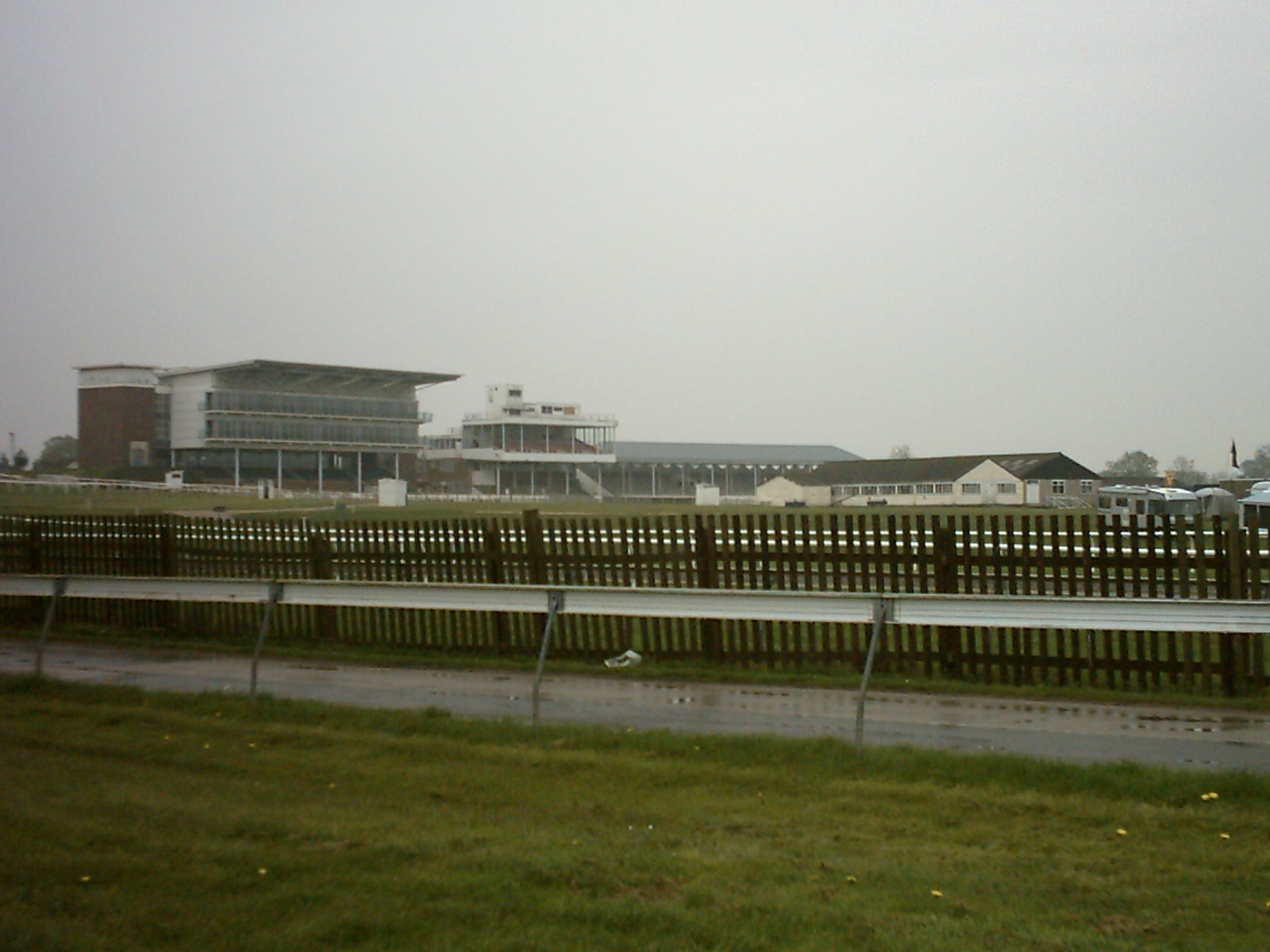
Wetherby Racecourse

There is one racecourse within the Leeds City area, and that is Wetherby Racecourse. Wetherby is a National Hunt racecourse (incidentally the only one in Yorkshire). West Yorkshire has a flat racecourse at Pontefract. Racedays attract people from across the UK to Wetherby. Wetherby is a medium-sized racecourse (although one of the larger ones in Yorkshire). The nearest major racecourse to Leeds is York.

=== Golf facilities in the Leeds area ===
Leeds is also home to many golf courses, with over 20 courses within 30 mins drive of the city centre. Amongst the best courses in the area are Alwoodley, Moortown and Sand Moor. Alwoodley is an 18-hole heathland course which has hosted many national tournaments. Moortown is also an 18-hole heathland course which has, in the past staged many major events including the 1929 Ryder Cup.

=== Swimming ===
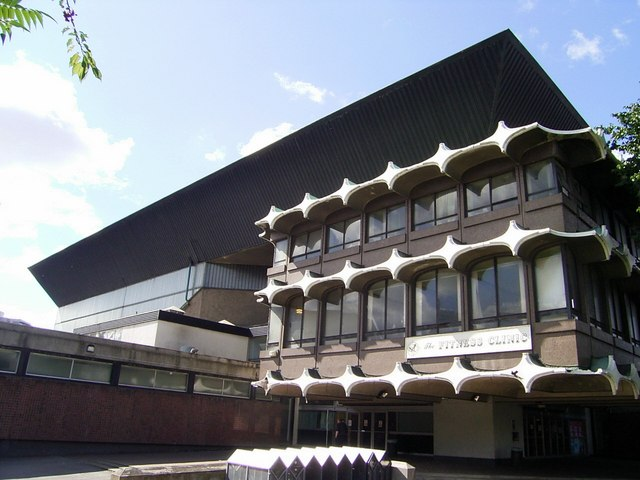
The Leeds International Pool

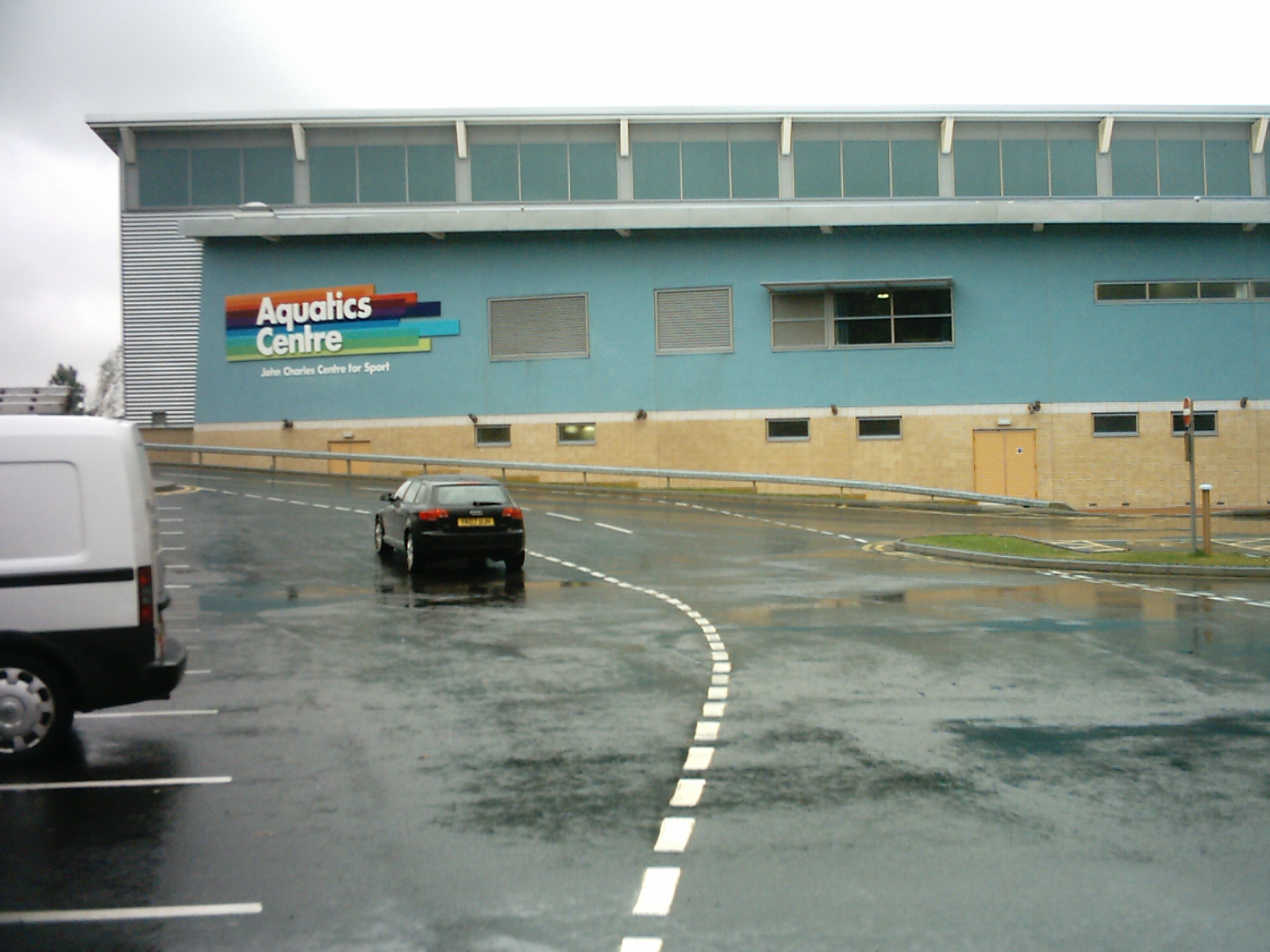
The Aquatics Centre at the John Charles Centre for Sport

Leeds' first major pool was the Leeds International Pool, designed by disgraced architect, John Poulson, this opened in 1967 and was inches too narrow to qualify as an Olympic standard pool. These closed in October 2007 and were replaced by the Aquatics Centre at the John Charles Centre for Sport. This offers an enlarged diving pool with a movable floor for alterations to the pools depth, as well as a 50m Olympic standard pool, with two inflatable booms enabling it to be divided up should this be desired. The new Aquatics centre also has an enlarged area for spectators around both pools. The Leeds International Pool has now closed and since been demolished.

== Notes and references ==
The Leeds International Pool was demolished in 2010.

== See also ==
- Leeds
- Football in Leeds
- Sport in England
- Sport in the United Kingdom
