= Everyday Sport =

Sport England's physical activity campaign

Everyday Sport is Sport England's physical activity campaign.

It was developed following work done in Germany, Australia, New Zealand, Finland and Canada which has shown that a social marketing campaign is a very useful tool in the overall drive to get more people playing sport, alongside development of the infrastructure of community sport.

Everyday Sport was launched as a pilot in the North East of England in May 2004, the campaign was then rolled out to the rest of the country in September 2005.

== See also ==
- Sport England
- Sport in England
