= Sport in England =

Sporting activity in England

Sport in England plays a prominent role in English society. Popular teams sports in England include association football, cricket, field hockey, rugby union, rugby league and netball. Major individual sports include badminton, athletics, tennis, boxing, golf, cycling, motorsport, and horseracing. Cricket is regarded as the national summer sport while football is the most popular sport, followed by cricket, tennis and rugby. A number of modern sports were codified in England during the nineteenth century, among them cricket, rugby union, rugby league, football, field hockey, bandy, squash, chess, tennis and badminton. The game of baseball was first described in 18th century England. England is the only country to have won the world cups in both football and cricket.

== Structure ==
England has its own national team in most team sports, but the United Kingdom sends a combined team to the Olympics. Competition between the home nations was traditionally at the centre of British sporting life, but it has become less important in recent decades. In particular, football's British Home Championship no longer takes place. In some sports there are still national English, Scottish, Welsh and Northern Irish teams.

The Club Competitions in most team sports are also English affairs rather than British ones. There are various anomalies however, such as the participation of five Welsh football clubs in the English league system and an English club in the Scottish Football League.

The relative prominence of national team and club competition varies from sport to sport. In football, club competition is at the centre of the agenda most of the time because clubs plays more matches each year, but the four national teams are also followed avidly. In cricket the national team is much more widely followed than the county competitions, which have a limited profile, whereas in rugby league club competition generally overshadows international fixtures. Rugby union falls between these two with very high-profile international competitions and a strengthening club game.

Sport England is the governing body responsible for distributing funds and providing strategic guidance for sporting activity in England. There are five National Sports Centres: Bisham Abbey, Crystal Palace, Holme Pierrepont National Watersports Centre, Lilleshall and Plas Y Brenin National Mountain Centre in Wales. Everyday Sport is Sport England's physical activity campaign. There are 49 County Sport Partnerships in England with areas for responsibility separated according to local authority boundaries. Many leisure centres, sports centres, or recreation centres are operated by local authorities or contracted out by them to an independent operator.

The English Institute of Sport is a nationwide network of support services, aimed at improving the standard of English athletes. Services include sports medicine, physiotherapy, sports massage, applied physiology, strength and conditioning, nutrition, psychology and Performance Lifestyle support. It is based at 8 regional hubs and other satellite centers.

The Minister for Sport and Tourism and the Department for Culture, Media and Sport have responsibility for sport in England.

== The role of sport in the formation of an English identity ==
England, like the other nations of the United Kingdom, competes as a separate nation in some international sporting events, notably in certain team sports which originated from England. The English football, cricket (the England Cricket team represents England and Wales) and rugby union teams have contributed to a growing sense of English identity. Supporters are more likely to carry the St George's Cross whereas thirty years ago the British Union Flag would have been the more prominent.

== Elite level team sports ==
There are four sports in England which operate high-profile professional leagues. Association football is by far the most popular sport and is played from August to May. Rugby union is also a winter sport. Cricket is played in the Summer, from April to September. Rugby league is traditionally a winter sport, but since the late 1990s the elite competition has been played in the summer to appeal to the family market, and take advantage of the faster pitches.

=== Football ===
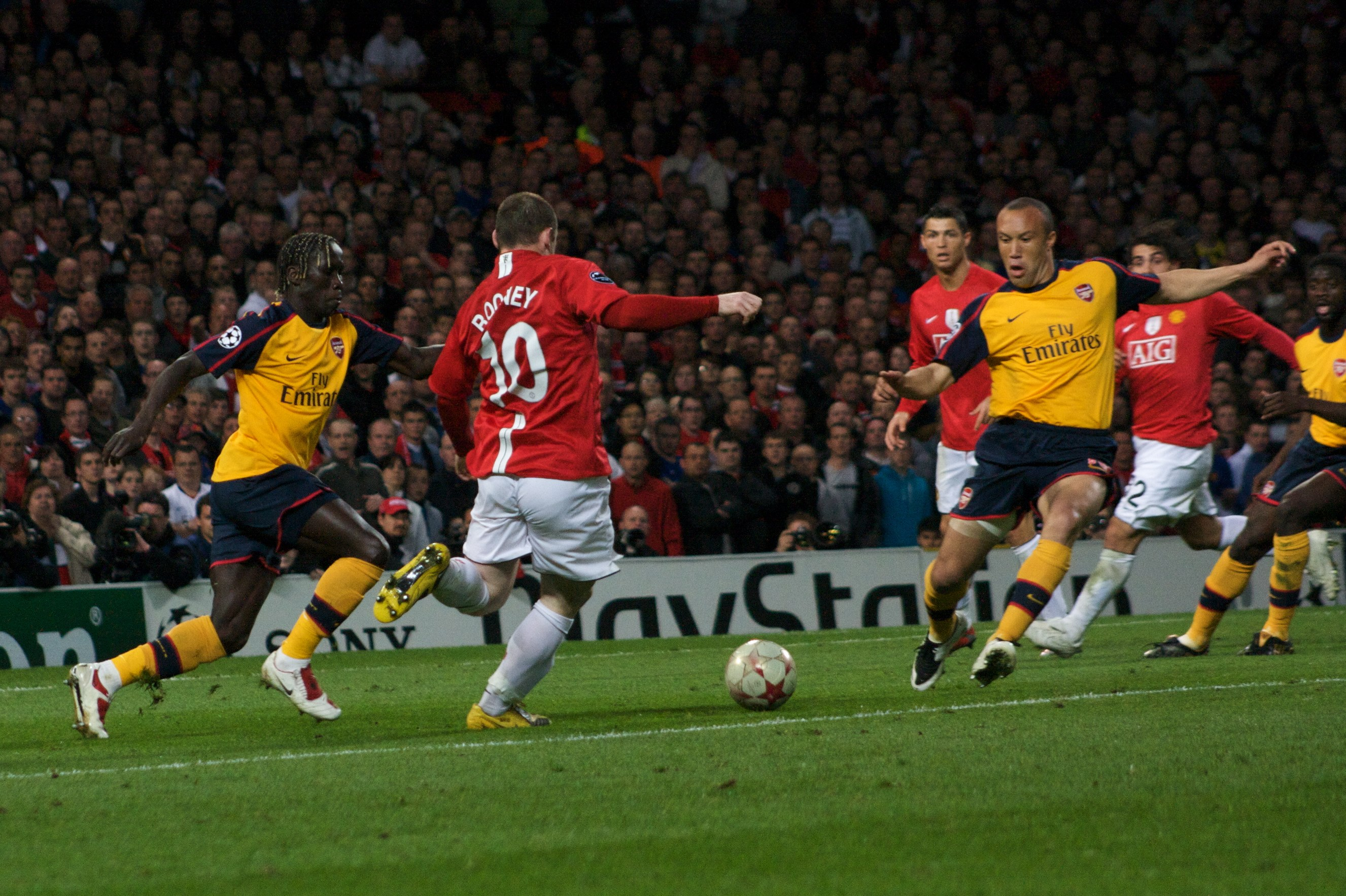
Manchester United play Arsenal in the 2008–09 Premier League.

The most popular sport in the UK, football was first codified in 1863 in London. It is known in the US and a few other countries as 'soccer.' The impetus for this was to unify English public school and university football games. There is evidence for refereed, team football games being played in English schools since at least 1581. An account of an exclusively kicking football game from Nottinghamshire in the fifteenth century bears striking similarity to football. The playing of football in England is documented since at least 1314. England is home to the oldest football clubs in the world (dating from at least 1857), the world's oldest competition (the FA Cup founded in 1871) and the first ever football league (1888). The modern passing game of football was developed in London in the early 1870s For these reasons England is considered the cradle of the game of football.

The governing body for football in England is The Football Association which is the oldest football organisation in the world. It is responsible for national teams, the recreational game and the main cup competitions. They have however lost a significant amount of power to the professional leagues in recent times.

English football has a league system which incorporates thousands of clubs, and is topped by four fully professional divisions. The elite Premier League has 20 teams and is the richest football league in the world. The other three fully professional divisions are the run by the English Football League, the oldest league in the world, and include another 72 clubs. Annual promotion and relegation operates between these four divisions and also between the lowest of them and lower level or "non-League" football. There are a small number of fully professional clubs outside the top four divisions, and many more semi-professional clubs. Thus England has over a hundred fully professional clubs in total, which is considerably more than any other country in Europe.

The two main cup competitions in England are the FA Cup, which is open to clubs down to Level 10 of the English football pyramid structure; and the League Cup (currently known as the Carabao Cup), which is for the 92 professional clubs in the four main professional divisions only.

Each season the most successful clubs from each of the home nations qualify for the three Europe-wide club competitions organised by UEFA: the UEFA Champions League (formerly the European Cup), the UEFA Europa League (formerly the UEFA Cup) and the UEFA Conference League. England has produced winners in each of these competitions.

The England national football team won the World Cup in 1966 when it was hosted in England. however, they took 55 years to reach a final of a major international tournament being Euro 2020, though they reached the semi-finals of the World Cup in 1990 and 2018, and the quarter-finals in 1986, 2002 and 2006. England reached the semi-finals of the UEFA European Championship when they hosted it in 1996, and finished third in Euro 1968; they also made the quarter-finals of Euro 2004 and 2012. In the UEFA Nations League, launched in 2018–19, they were assigned to the top level of that competition, League A, and advanced to the semi-finals in that season.

The FA hopes that the completion of the National Football Centre will go some way to improving the national team's performance.

=== Cricket ===
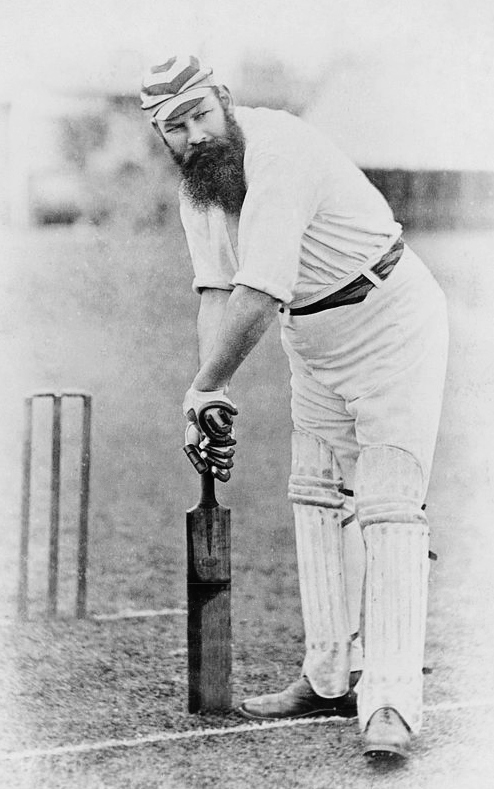
Cricketer W.G. Grace

Cricket is another popular team sport, regarded as one of the national sports of England and the second most popular and followed sport in the country.

Although there is some debate about the origins of the game, modern cricket is generally believed to have originated in England with the laws of cricket – adhered to by players at all levels worldwide – established by the London-based Marylebone Cricket Club. Although the origins of cricket in England date back as far as the sixteenth century, formal laws of the game began to be developed in the eighteenth century. Most recently, the globally popular Twenty20 format of cricket was innovated in England at the turn of the 21st century.

The England national cricket team is one of the twelve Full Members of the International Cricket Council, enabling England to participate in Test, One Day Internationals and Twenty20 International matches, as well as the ICC Cricket World Cup. Cricket in England is administered by the England and Wales Cricket Board, having been overseen by the Test and County Cricket Board until 1997. It is one of only 2 countries in Europe to be full ICC members, along with the Ireland cricket team.

England's professional domestic system consists of eighteen teams from the historic counties of England and Wales, playing a variety of matches over the summer cricket season. These clubs participate in the County Championship, a two-tiered First Class cricket competition recognised as one of the oldest domestic cricket tournaments in the world, as well as the limited overs 50 Overs tournament (known as the Royal London One Day Cup for sponsorship reasons as of 2019) and the Vitality T20 Blast, which has notably helped in popularising the domestic aspect of the game. Twenty more clubs compete in the amateur Minor Counties Cricket Championship. The Hundred, a new franchise based and new format of the game was scheduled to begin as a domestic competition in the 2020 season, but has been postponed due to the COVID-19 pandemic.

Cricket is a popular recreational and summer sport in England, with hundreds of clubs playing at various levels; village cricket in particular is regarded as a key aspect of English culture. The Lancashire League was formed in 1892 and is renowned for the extensive list of professional players who have participated in it, particularly during the middle of the twentieth century. It is also a popular school and university sport in the summer.

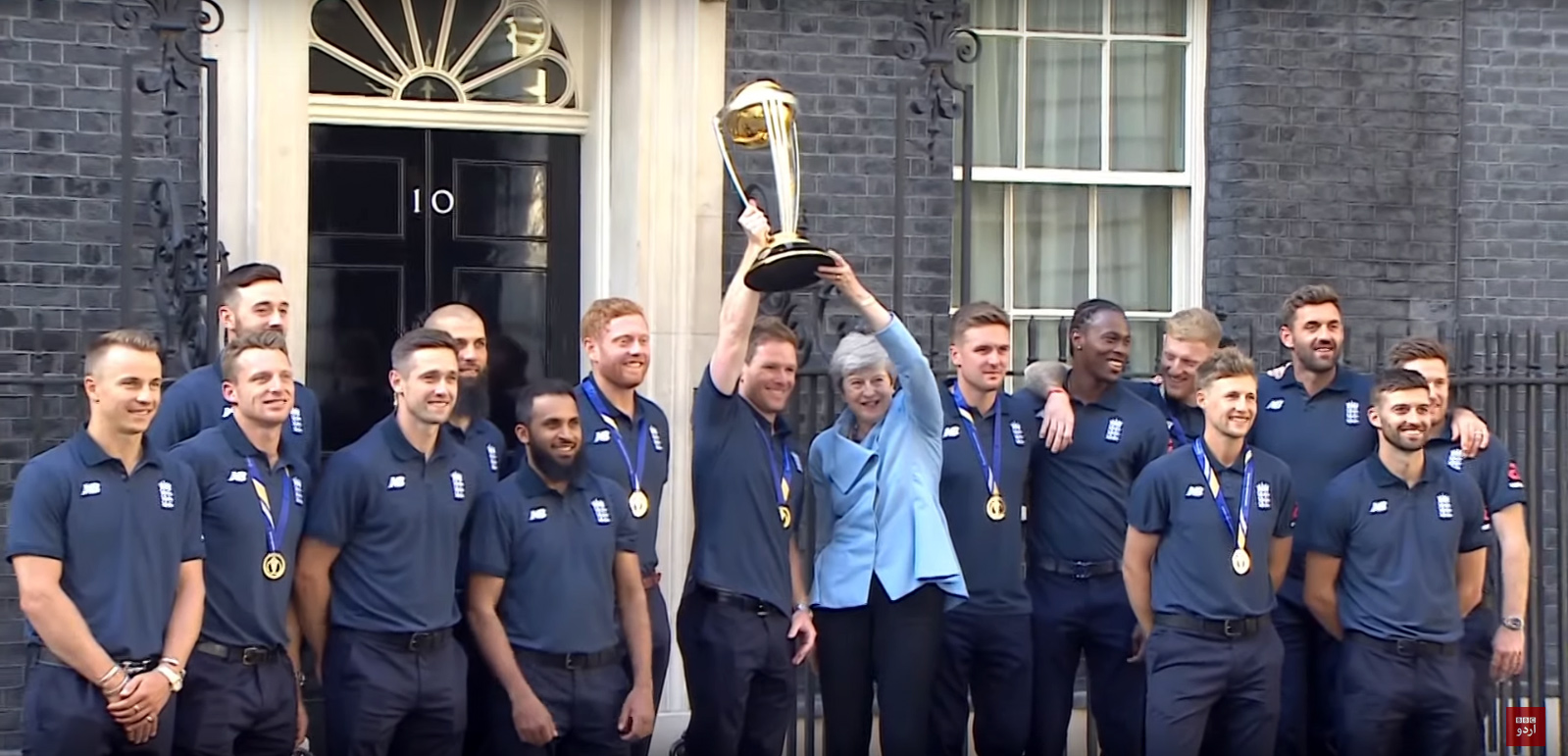
ICC Cricket World Cup 2019 winning England Cricket team with PM Theresa May

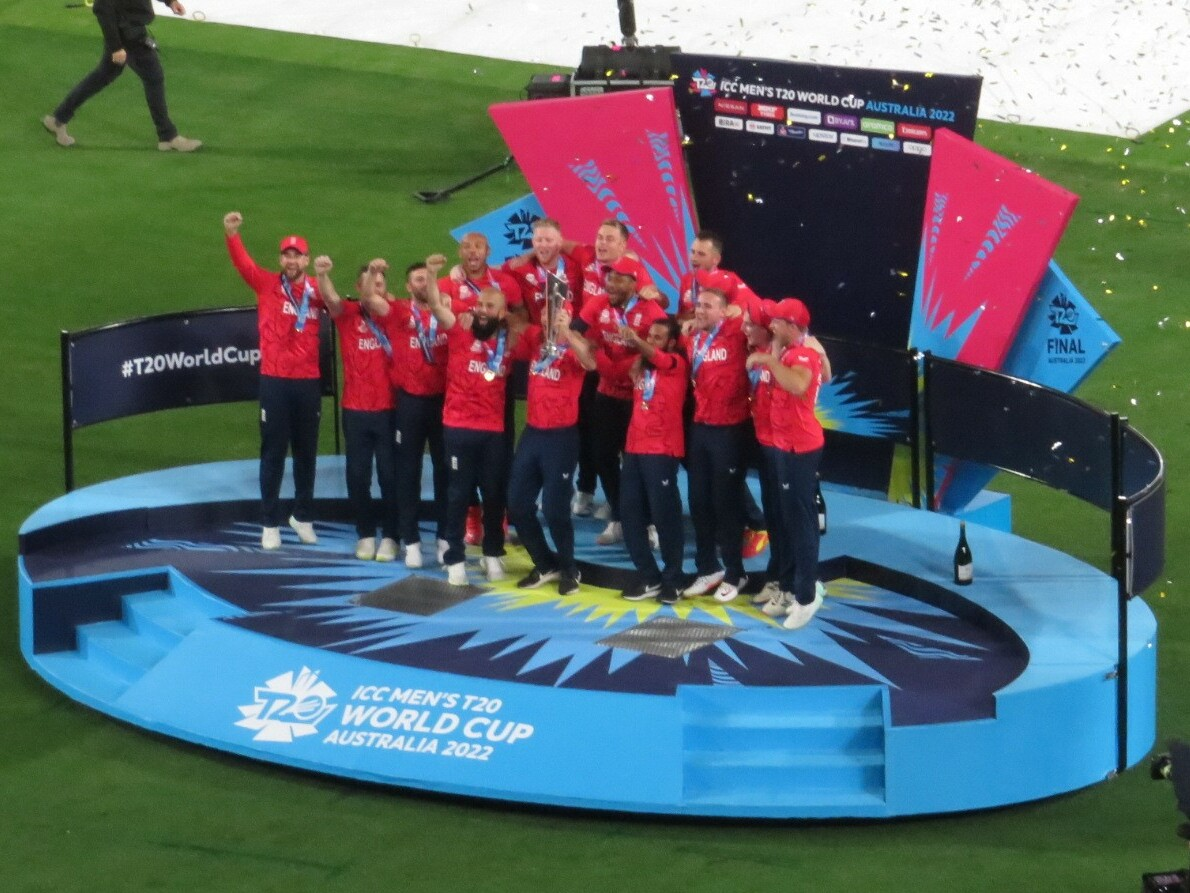
England win the ICC Men's T20 World Cup 2022.

Lord's Cricket Ground, located in the St. John's Wood area of London, is known as "the home of cricket" and in addition to housing the Marylebone Cricket Club, is also the headquarters of the European Cricket Council and was until 2005 the headquarters of the International Cricket Council. England has hosted five ICC Men's Cricket World Cups to date, in 1975, 1979, 1983, 1999 and 2019. In addition to these tournaments, England has also hosted the ICC Men's T20 World Cup in 2009 and the ICC Men's Champions Trophy in 2004 and 2013.

England have won one ICC Cricket World Cup, in 2019. They previously finished as runners up in the 1979, 1987 and 1992 tournaments. In addition, England have won the ICC Men's T20 World Cup twice in 2010 and 2022.

England enjoys a storied rivalry with Australia, against whom they compete for The Ashes in a contest that dates back to the nineteenth century. The English cricket team also enjoys rivalries against India and the West Indies, although the latter is no longer as fierce as it was during its peak in the 1980s.

England is also a pioneering nation in the sport of Indoor Cricket. The first organised indoor cricket league in the world took place in 1970 in North Shropshire, and the first national tournament was completed in 1976 with over 400 clubs taking part. By 1979 over 1000 clubs were taking part in indoor cricket in the UK, and it remains extremely popular today with many leagues around the country.

=== Rugby ===
Like association football, rugby union and rugby league both developed from traditional British football games in the 19th century. Rugby was codified by the Rugby Football Union in 1871. The Rugby Football League developed after a number of leading clubs, that wished to be allowed to compensate their players for missing work, formed their own governing body in 1895 and subsequently the two organisations developed somewhat different rules. For much of the 20th century there was considerable antagonism between rugby league, which was a mainly working class game based in the industrial regions of northern England, and rugby union, which is a predominantly middle class game in England, and is also popular in the other home nations. This antagonism has abated since 1995 when the governing body now known as World Rugby opened rugby union to professional players.

==== Rugby union ====
The four home nations compete separately at international level. They take part in the main European international rugby union competition, the Six Nations Championship. England won the 2003 Rugby World Cup, the first victory in the competition by a British team (or, for that matter, any Northern Hemisphere country). England's Red Roses won the 2025 Women's Rugby World Cup.

The main rugby union club competition in England is a 13-team league called the Gallagher Premiership, and there is also a cup competition, the Premiership Rugby Cup, launched in 2018–19 as the replacement for the now-defunct Anglo-Welsh Cup, which included teams from Wales from 2005 until its demise. Attendances at club rugby in England have risen strongly since the sport went professional. English club sides also take part in the two Europe-wide club rugby competitions, the European Rugby Champions Cup and the European Rugby Challenge Cup. English clubs such as Leicester Tigers, Bath Rugby, Wasps and Northampton Saints have had success in the predecessor to the Champions Cup, the Heineken Cup.

==== Rugby league ====
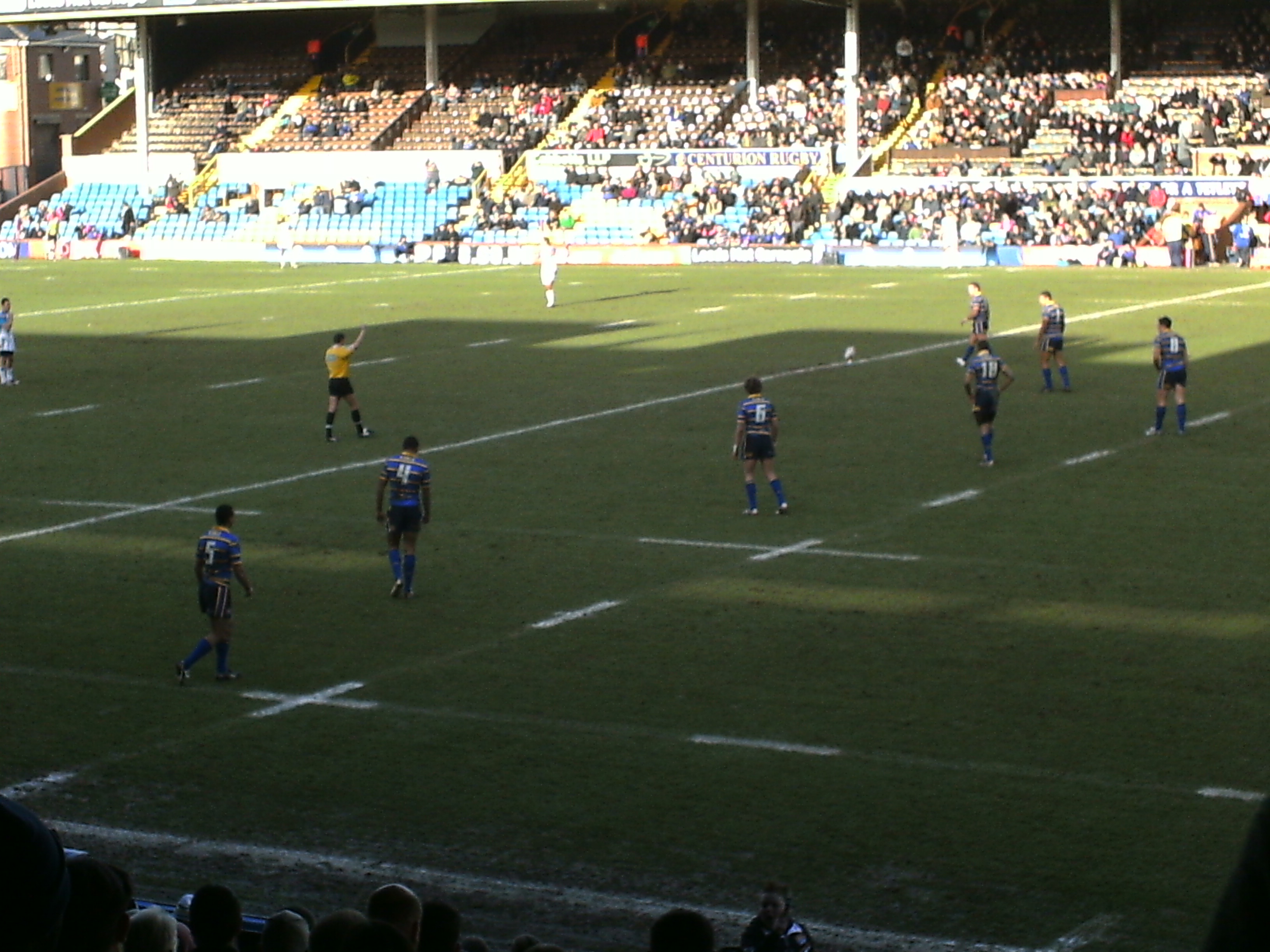
Leeds Rhinos playing at the 2008 boxing day friendly against Wakefield Trinity Wildcats at Headingley, Leeds

The governing body of rugby league in the United Kingdom is the Rugby Football League. Rugby league draws most of its support from its heartlands in Yorkshire, North West England, and Cumbria. Although playing numbers have recently topped 60,000 in London and the south east.

The top-level league is the 12-team Super League, which was reduced from 14 teams due to a major reorganisation of the professional leagues in 2015. Ten teams are based in the heartlands, with the other teams in France and Canada. Below Super League is the Championship, with 14 teams, and League 1, with 11 teams. As of the next season in 2020, the Championship has twelve teams from the heartlands and one each from London and France; League 1 has six heartland teams, three teams from Newcastle, Coventry and London, and two from Wales – one in the North and one in the South West.

There is direct promotion and relegation between each of the three divisions in professional Rugby League. The bottom placed team from the Super League is directly relegated to the Championship, replaced by the winner of a five team play-off structure, contested by the top five placed teams in that seasons Championship. The bottom two placed teams of the Championship are directly relegated, replaced by the top placed team in League One, along with the winner of a five team play-off structure, contested by the teams that finish between second and sixth in League One.

Following a reorganisation in 2014, the seasons of Super League and the Championship were much more closely integrated than in the past. Following a 22-game home-and-away season in both leagues, the leagues split into three eight-team groups known as "Super 8's". The first, the Super League Super 8's, involved the top eight teams on the Super League table. After these teams played a round-robin mini-league, with table points carrying over from the league season, the top four entered a knockout play-off that culminated in the Super League Grand Final at Old Trafford. The second group, the Qualifiers Super 8's, involved the bottom four teams from Super League and the top four from the Championship. After a similar round-robin mini-league (but with all teams starting on 0 points), the top three teams earned places in the following year's Super League. The fourth- and fifth-place teams then played a one-off match, billed as the "Million Pound Game", for the final Super League place. The final group, the Championship Shield Super 8's, involved the bottom eight teams from the Championship. These teams played their own round-robin mini-league, with table points carrying over. The top four teams after the extra games contested a knockout play-off for the Championship Shield, while the bottom two teams are relegated to League 1. From 2009 through to 2014, Super League consisted of 14 franchises, based on renewable three-year licences, but that system was scrapped following the 2014 season.

The main knock-out competition is the Challenge Cup, which also includes clubs from France, Ireland, Scotland and Wales, as well as having featured teams from Canada, Russia, and Serbia in the past, and each year culminates in a history-steeped final at Wembley Stadium. Teams competing in the Challenge Cup range from the top professional teams in the Super League, through to amateur teams, plus representative sides from the British Army, Royal Navy, Royal Air Force and British Police, along with occasional invited teams from other countries, such as Red Star Belgrade of Serbia in 2019. The amateur and representative sides enter in the earliest rounds, with professional teams from the more senior leagues entering at later stages of the competition. In addition to the Challenge Cup, teams from the Championship and League One compete in the 1895 Cup, with the final played at Wembley Stadium on the same day as the Challenge Cup Final.

Rugby league is also played as an amateur sport, especially in the heartland areas, where the game is administered by BARLA. Since the rugby union authorities ended the discrimination against playing rugby league amateur numbers in the sport have increased, particularly outside the heartland areas. Through competitions such as the Rugby League Conference, consisting of one nationwide league of ten teams and twelve other regional leagues, including one Welsh and one Scottish league, the sport now has a national spread, at amateur level at least.

Internationally, England fields a competitive team in international rugby league. For many tournaments the home nations are combined to compete as Great Britain. The Great Britain team won the Rugby League World Cup in 1954, 1960 and 1972, but England and Wales now compete separately in this tournament and Australia held the title from 1975 until 2008 when they finally lost their grip on the title after being beaten by New Zealand in a thrilling final in Brisbane. England and Wales jointly hosted the World Cup in 2013, with matches also held in France and Ireland; Australia regained the crown, retaining it at the 2017 World Cup after beating England 6–0 in the final – the lowest scoring final in Rugby League World Cup history.

The England team competes in the annual Four Nations competition.

The England national rugby league team will compete more regularly as a full test nation, in lieu of the Great Britain national rugby league team, which, following the 2007 Centenary Test Series against New Zealand only reforms as an occasional southern hemisphere touring side. However, in 2018, the Great Britain national rugby league team was reformed after a 10-year hiatus in preparation of a tour of the Southern Hemisphere.

=== Calendar of the major men's and women's professional elite level team sports leagues in England ===
January	February	March	April	May	June	July	August	September	October	November	December
Premier League (Football)							Premier League (Football)				
PREM Rugby (Rugby Union)								PREM Rugby (Rugby Union)			
			County Championship (Cricket)								
						The Hundred (Cricket)					
				T20 Blast (Cricket)							
	Super League (Rugby League)										

January	February	March	April	May	June	July	August	September	October	November	December
Women's Super League (Football)								Women's Super League (Football)			
Premiership Women's Rugby (Rugby Union)										Premiership Women's Rugby (Rugby Union)	
						The Hundred (Cricket)					
				Women's T20 Blast (Cricket)							
				RFL Women's Super League (Rugby League)							

=== Other team sports ===
==== Basketball ====
Basketball is a minor sport in England. As of the 2006–07 season the top-level league is the ten team British Basketball League and second league is the twelve team English Basketball League. The teams are professional or semi-professional but have modest resources. Great Britain men's national basketball team, which was formed by the national basketball organisations of England, Scotland and Wales on 1 December 2005, have not achieved any notable success. Great Britain qualified for the 2009 European basketball championship after 28 years absence from any major international basketball event for any of the Great Britain's countries' national teams. At Eurobasket 2011 Great Britain recorded their first Eurobasket win en route to a 2–3 record, finishing 13th out of 24 teams.

On 13 March 2011, Fiba voted 17–3 in favour of Great Britain receiving their host nation spot at the 2012 Olympic games with one condition, they have until 30 June 2012 to decide on whether to merge the three nations that make up the team or disband after the 2016 Summer Olympics in Rio de Janeiro.

==== Field hockey ====
Hockey is a moderately popular recreational sport in England. The Great Britain women's hockey team won the 2016 Rio Olympics with over 10 million viewers on TV, the men's team won the hockey tournament at the 1988 Olympics. Women's hockey at International, Premier League and Conference League level is sponsored by Investec. The Men's England Hockey League and Women's England Hockey League contain very high levels of club hockey ability and usually at least two clubs from both the men's and women's leagues proceed to European Competitions. Each week highlights of that week's games get posted on YouTube.

Hockey's popularity is rising fast with the women winning the Rio Olympics in 2016 and the men winning the Azlan Shah Cup in 2017.

==== Ice Hockey ====
Ice Hockey is Britain's largest indoor spectator sport. It has a long history in the UK and it is reasonably well supported, with the larger teams attracting thousands of fans to every game. The main league is the ten-team professional Elite League, which has featured many former NHL players, predominantly during the NHL lockout season. At the moment the Great Britain men's national ice hockey team is in division 1 of the Ice Hockey World Championships. The team is ranked 23rd in the world in the IIHF World Ranking system.

Media support for ice hockey has improved on a national level, although the majority of news is still found on the internet. Sky Sports has been covering the Elite league for a few seasons, and starting in the 2010/2011 season they will be showing 8 live games and a highlight show every week; the reason this deal happened was due to the elite league attracting very large viewing figures and Sky seeing the Elite Ice Hockey League as a potentially big and popular league.

==== Lacrosse ====
Lacrosse in England is played in both the men's (field & indoor) and women's (field) versions of the games and governed by English Lacrosse Association. Currently the England men's team are European champions and are ranked fifth in the world. The women's team are currently second in Europe (however have won the competition three out of the seven times it has been competed for); they are also ranked fourth in the World (having won silver in both the 1987 and 1991 World Championships).

England has sent national teams to the Under-19 World Lacrosse Championships.

As of June 2021, England's Alex Russell was one of two non-North American players on an NCAA Division I roster and the only one to see game action. The graduate midfielder served as a captain for Long Island University, where he appeared in 11 games (10 starts), and recorded 20 points off 15 goals and five assists. Russell also scooped up 12 ground balls.

==== Bandy ====
England is seen as one of the birthplaces of bandy, beside Russia (where a similar game developed simultaneously). The match which later has been dubbed the original bandy match was held in London in 1875. England won the 1913 European Bandy Championships in Davos, Switzerland. Following the outbreak of the First World War, the interest for bandy vanished in England and the National Bandy Association was discontinued. Almost a hundred years later, bandy was reintroduced to England and the Bandy Federation of England was founded in 2010, changing names to Great Britain Bandy Association in 2017. The England national team for men then were rebranded as a British men's national team and made a world official international début at the 2019 World Championship, while the women's national team participated for the first time at the 2022 World Championship.

==== Underwater Hockey ====
Underwater Hockey is a growing sport in England but is more established than other home nations as England was the sport's birthplace in Southsea. The nation has 56 clubs registered with the British Octopush Association and regular sees native born players compete for Great Britain.

==== American football ====
American football was introduced to England during the early part of the 20th century by American servicemen stationed in the country. During the Second World War, matches were played by American and Canadian servicemen stationed in the UK at venues throughout the country. This included the 'Tea Bowl' game played at the White City Stadium in 1944.

In England, Scotland and Wales, the domestic game is organised by the British American Football Association (BAFA), who operate a series of league competitions as the BAFA National Leagues. The championship game is known as the BritBowl.

==== Australian rules football ====
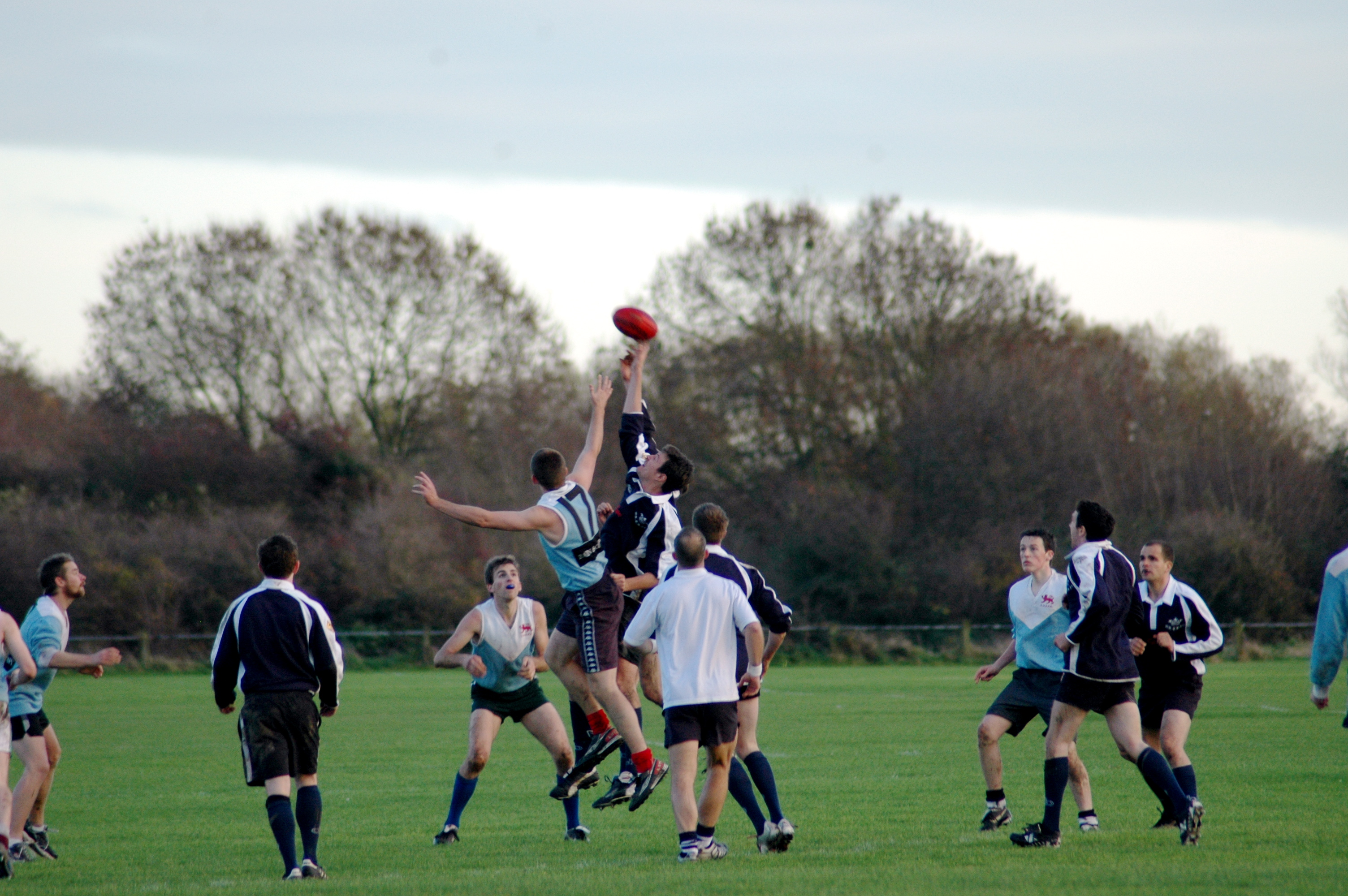
Cambridge and Oxford Universities play Australian rules football.

Australian rules football has a long but obscure history in England but has grown since 1989 to several amateur leagues. England regularly plays international matches against other countries and competes in the Australian Football International Cup as a part of the Great Britain men's national Australian rules football team.

Australian Football League exhibition matches have been held in London every few years since 1972.

==== Gaelic sports ====
The Irish sports of Gaelic football and hurling are also organised on a similar basis. Dating back to the 1880s London GAA teams compete in top-level competitions in Ireland. During the 1970s, and 1980s there were as many as 85 GAA clubs in the London area and hundreds around Britain, but due to the fall-off in Irish immigration in the 1990s the number has fallen considerably.

== Elite level individual sports ==
=== Tennis ===
Tennis is the largest individual sport in England in terms of registered players and viewing audiences. Every year The Wimbledon Championships take place in London. They are the most prestigious tennis championships in the world and attract the largest global audience.

=== Athletics ===
England does not compete at the Olympic Games. Instead English athletes compete as part of Great British team, Team GB. London (the Capital of England and the UK) hosted the Summer Olympics in 1908, 1948 and 2012 making it the first city in the world to host the Summer Olympics three times.

Various athletics events which are individualistic are viewed as popular in England. In August 2014 Mo Farah became the most successful athlete in the European Athletics Championships history.

=== Squash ===
England has produced many squash world number ones, and has been known to dominate the world rankings.

=== Badminton ===
Badminton is England's most popular racket sport. It is an accessible sport where beginners can experience success early through basic rallying, but at the top level it requires high levels of power, agility and endurance. Badminton is an Olympic sport and Great Britain achieved medal success in both Sydney 2000 and Athens 2004. The All England Open Badminton Championships takes place in Birmingham every year and attracts all the top players from around the world.

=== Golf ===
Although originating in Scotland, England has played a major role in the development of golf, including the origins of the Professional Golfers' Association (Great Britain & Ireland). Major golf tournaments held in England include the Open Championship (an English course hosting the event two years in every five) and the BMW PGA Championship, the flagship event of the European Tour. The Ryder Cup also originated in England, with the event being held on English courses numerous times.

=== Motorsport ===
The majority of the Formula One teams are based in England. Drivers from England have won sixteen Formula One World Championship drivers titles. Lewis Hamilton is the most notable current English driver, having won seven championships (most recently in 2020). The British Grand Prix takes place at Silverstone, most frequently in July. Major motor racing series based in the UK include the GB3 Championship, British Superbike Championship, British GT Championship and the British Touring Car Championship.

English drivers (most notably Richard Burns) have achieved success in the World Rally Championship. Since 2000 the British Superbike Championship has become increasingly popular, surpassing its four-wheeled rivals in terms of spectator receipts and television coverage. Britain hosts one round of the MotoGP championship at Silverstone, and one of the Superbike World Championship at Donington Park in 2018 but has previously visited Brands Hatch and Silverstone.

England is commonly seen as the widely dominant country for building racing cars. In addition to Formula One successes, historic names such as Lola, March, Reynard and Chevron have supplied numerous teams. Universities offering motorsport courses always back up this claim. Between the mid-1980s to the 1990s cars built in Britain were widely dominant in CART racing and the Indianapolis 500 in the United States.

=== Boxing ===
England played a key role in the evolution of modern boxing, with the codification of the rules of the sport known as the Queensberry Rules in the 19th century.

British professional boxing offers some of the largest purses outside the United States to a few elite professional boxers who become nationally known. British heavyweight contenders are especially popular, but most British world champions have fought in the middling weight brackets. The governing bodies of professional boxing are the British Boxing Board of Control and the British & Irish Boxing Authority. It is generally felt that British professional boxing is in decline in the early years of the 21st century. The reasons for this include: the fact that football now offers a relatively large number of sportsmen the chance to make the sort of income traditionally only available to world boxing champions, reducing the incentive for athletic youngsters to accept the greater risks of a boxing career; the acquisition of the rights to most major fights by Sky Sports, which means that fewer boxers become national figures than in the past; and the knock the sport's credibility has taken from the multiplicity of title sanctioning bodies.

Amateur boxing is governed by the Amateur Boxing Association of England (ABA) and the equivalent bodies in the other home nations. British amateurs have only enjoyed a very modest amount of success in international competition in recent decades, partly due to the tendency for them to turn professional at an early stage. The amateur sport is in a very poor state, with dramatic declines in boxer numbers. National amateur boxing championships and international team matches, which were once highlights of the British sporting calendar, receive only limited national recognition.

=== Mixed Martial Arts ===
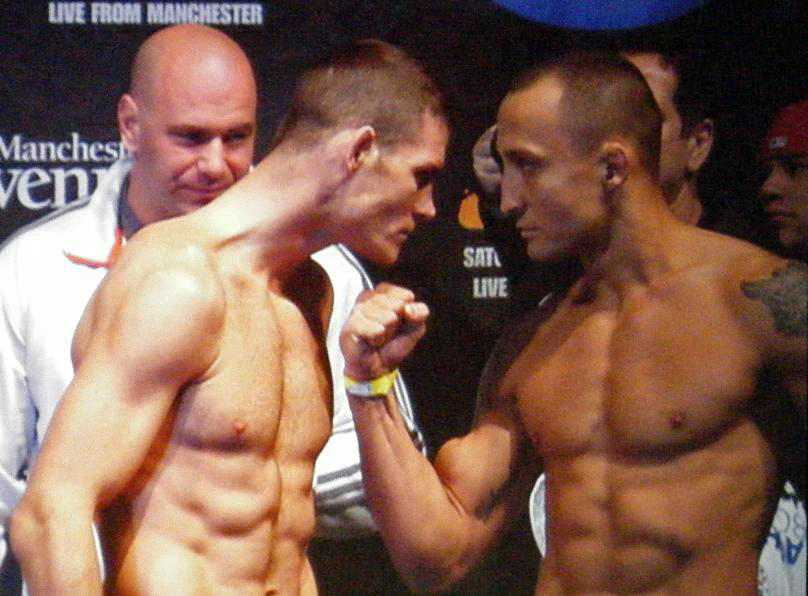
England's Michael Bisping (left) squaring off against Canada's Denis Kang (right) at the Manchester Evening News Arena

Mixed martial arts (MMA) has generally increased in popularity since being on the verge of oblivion in the early 1990s, but it has not seen anything like the popularity it has in the U.S.A duplicated in England. However, the rise of English MMA fighters have led to increased attention to the sport. In addition, Conor McGregor enjoys widespread name recognition in England, which has many residents of Irish heritage.

Things slowly started to change when Michael Bisping came onto the scene and won The Ultimate Fighter 3 and earned a six-figure contract to the UFC. Bisping built UK MMA a bit quicker alongside Ross Pearson and James Wilks, the two winners of The Ultimate Fighter: United States vs. United Kingdom. Bisping coached Team UK. After that TUF season, MMA in the UK began to build. UK MMA is being pushed further with the likes of Dan Hardy, Brad Pickett, John Hathaway, Jimi Manuwa, Rosi Sexton, and Luke Barnatt. MMA was also boosted in the UK on The Ultimate Fighter: The Smashes. The show saw the UK vs Australia. It was an MMA spin-off of The Ashes.

At UFC 111, in Newark, New Jersey, Nottingham's Dan Hardy fought Canada's Georges St-Pierre for the UFC Welterweight Championship on 27 March 2010, becoming the first UK fighter to fight for a UFC title in the history of the organisation. Hardy lost the fight via unanimous decision. St-Pierre took Hardy down and controlled him with effective ground and pound. St-Pierre secured a tight armbar and kimura on Hardy in rounds 1 and 4. Hardy refused to tap, however, despite the danger of his arm being broken.

After a huge win in London against Anderson Silva, Michael Bisping finally got his long-awaited UFC title fight in a rematch against Luke Rockhold at UFC 199 at The Forum in Inglewood, California, who submitted Bisping at UFC Fight Night: Rockhold vs. Bisping on 7 November 2014 in Sydney, Australia with a guillotine choke in round 2. Rockhold was originally set to rematch Chris Weidman, whom he took the title from at UFC 194, but, Weidman was forced to withdraw due to a neck injury. The UFC's first choice was Ronaldo Souza but 'Jacaré' was undergoing knee surgery. Therefore, the UFC chose Bisping to face Luke Rockhold for the UFC Middleweight Championship. Despite being 37 years old, with only 2 weeks notice and being a 10/1 underdog, all it took Bisping was a left hook to wobble the Californian with another left after he waited patiently for Rockhold to get back up. Bisping landed 3 strikes after he dropped Rockhold again and referee John McCarthy stopped the fight. Michael Bisping fulfilled his destiny and realised his dream. Bisping was crowned UFC World Middleweight Champion and became the first British World Champion in UFC history.

=== Other individual sports ===
Other sports with loyal followings include snooker, which is popular with television companies as it fills swathes of their schedules at a very low cost, and also attracts a good number of viewers. However, its popularity has waned somewhat since 1985, when nearly a third of the British population watched the conclusion of the celebrated Dennis Taylor versus Steve Davis World Championship final even though it ended after midnight. Darts is another British-centred sport with an assured place in the attention of the English sporting public. Lawn Bowls is popular, particularly with the elderly. International competitions are often televised.

== Commonwealth Games ==
Commonwealth Games England (CGE) is a sports governing body that leads and manages the participation of the England team at the Commonwealth Games.

== Major sports facilities ==
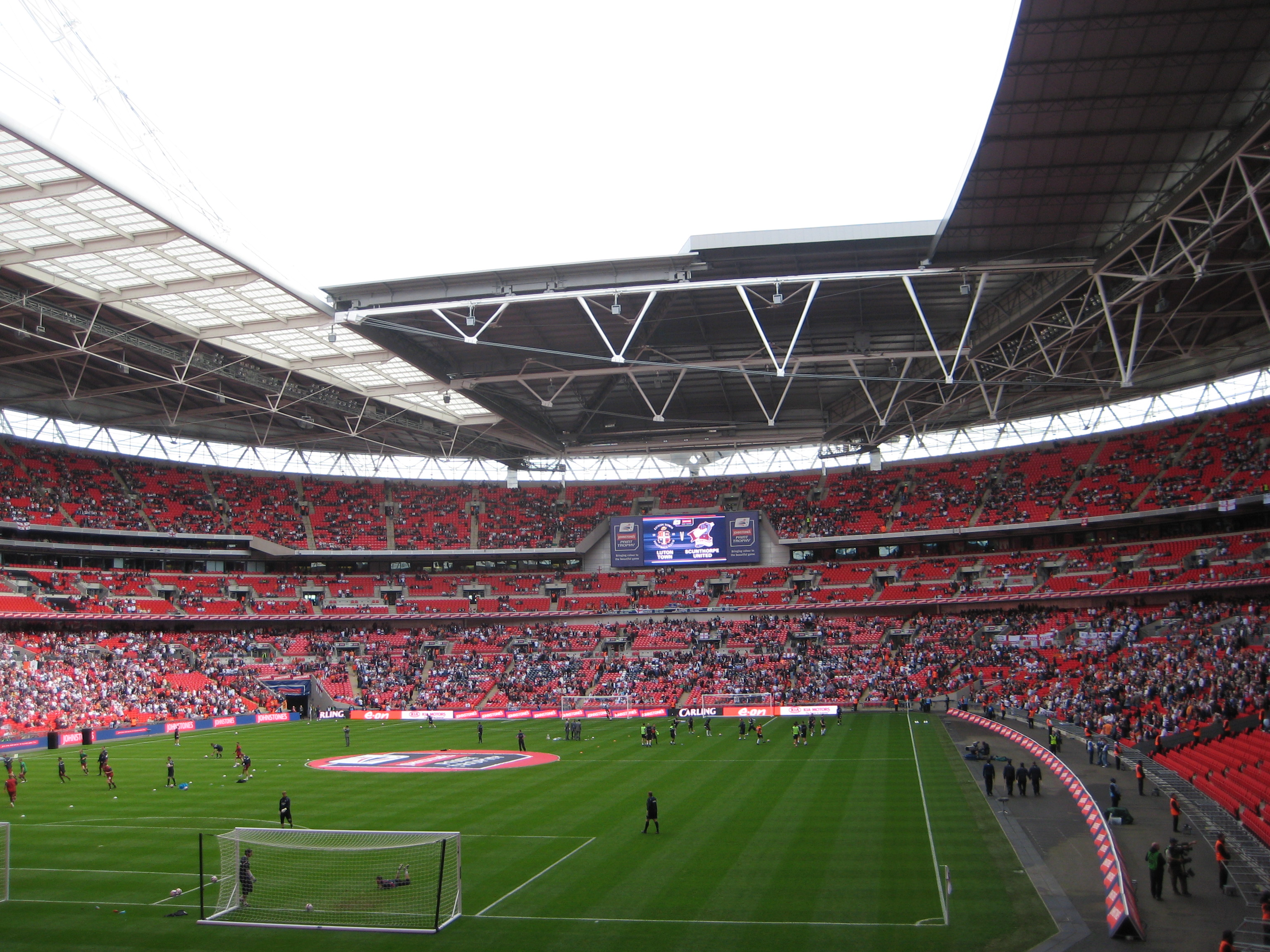
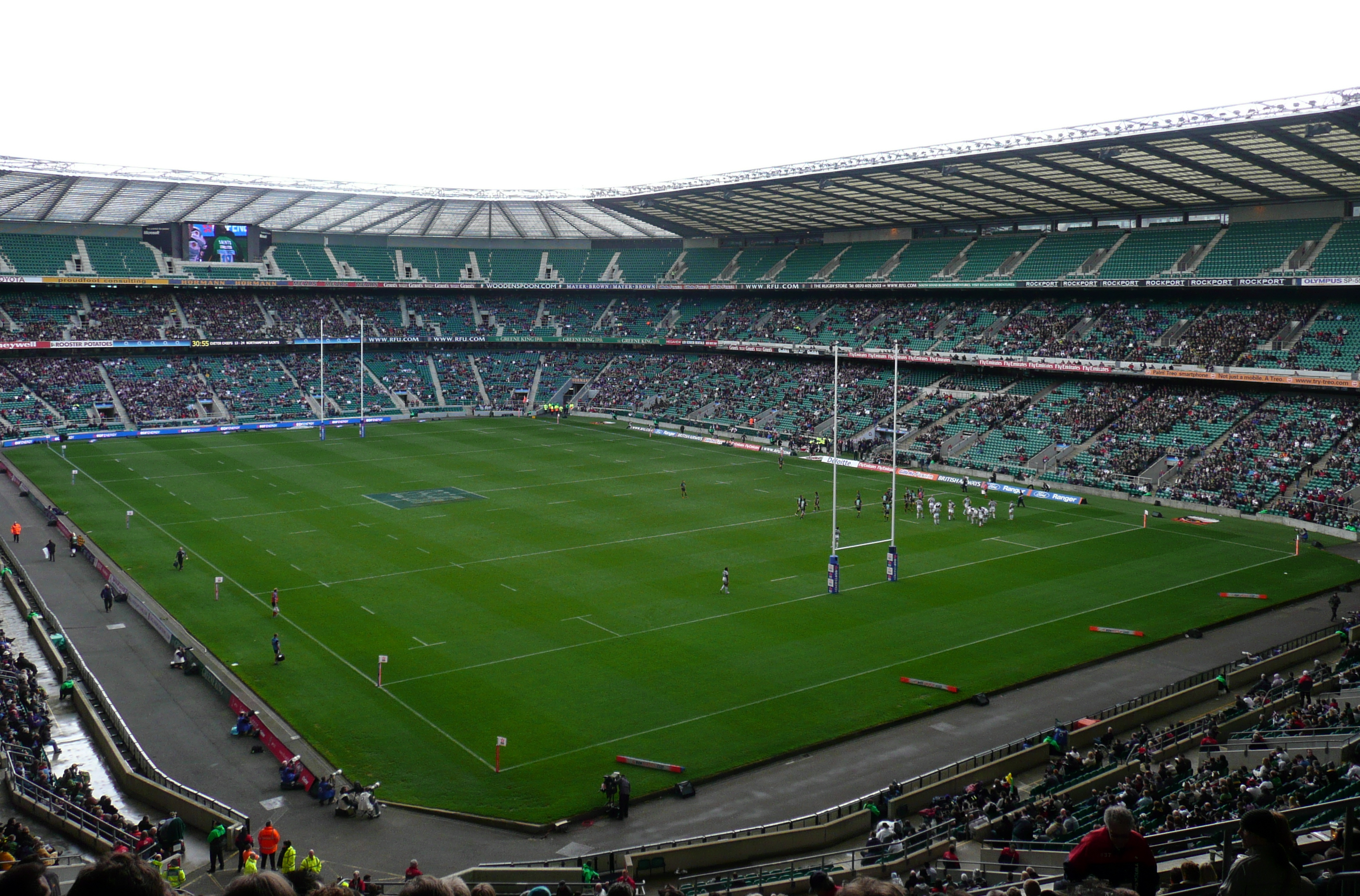
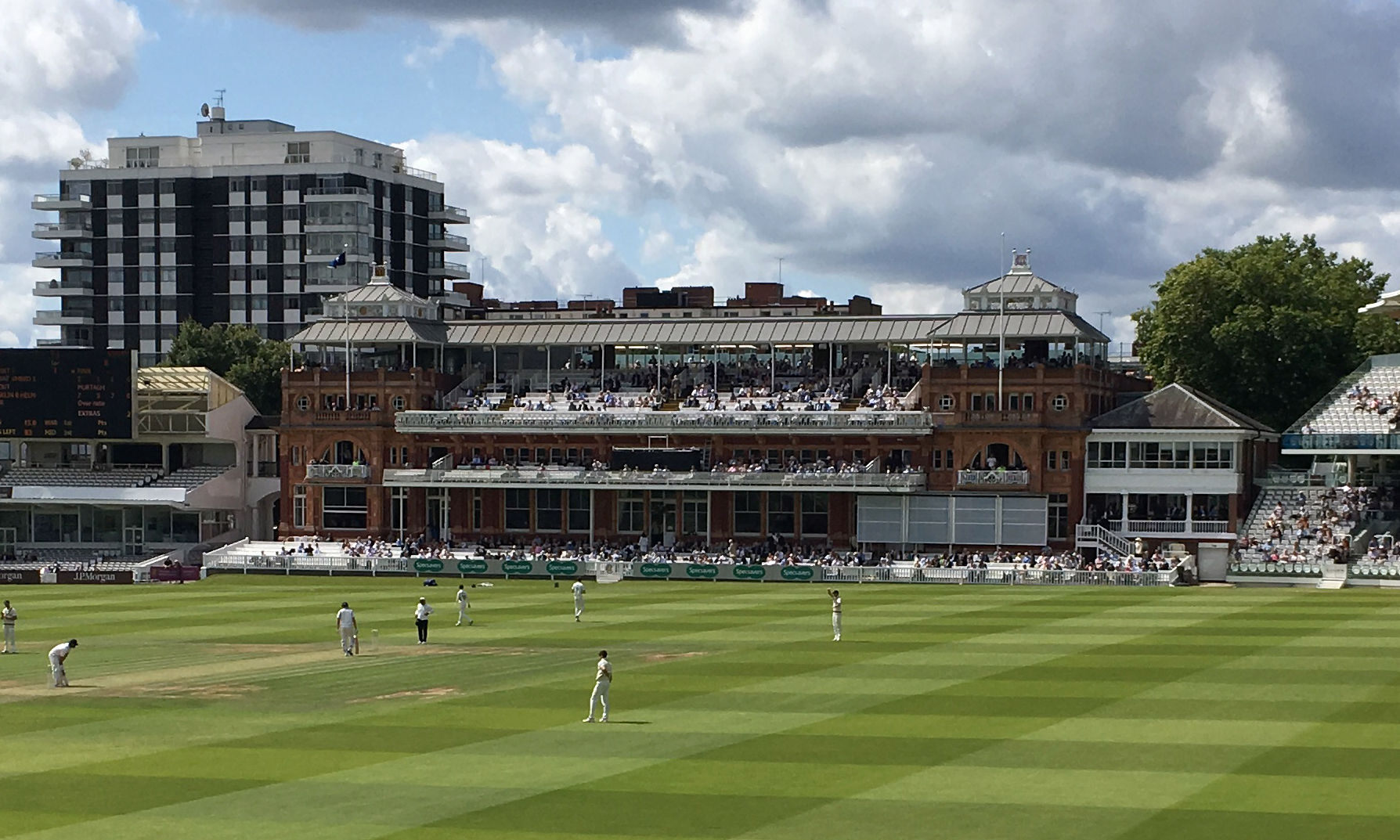
The three national stadium in England, for football, rugby union, and cricket

In the early 20th century England had some of the largest sports facilities in the world, but the level of comfort and amenities they offered would be considered totally unacceptable by modern standards. After a long period of decline relative to other developed countries English facilities have made a relative improvement since the 1980s, and this is ongoing.

=== National stadiums ===
- Twickenham (England rugby union team) has a capacity of 82,000 making it the largest stadium in the world devoted solely to the sport of rugby and it is the fifth largest stadium in Europe.
- Wembley Stadium (England football team) The newly reconstructed Wembley has also been used by the Great Britain rugby league team, and for major club matches in rugby league. It can seat 90,000 people, second largest capacity in Europe.
- Lord's Cricket Ground (England cricket team). Lord's is considered to be the spiritual 'home of Test Cricket' and is the home of the MCC. It has a seating capacity of 30,000

=== Club association football grounds ===
English football grounds are almost always football-only facilities in which the spectators are close to the action. Since the late 1980s there has been a dramatic spurt of reconstruction and replacement of league grounds, which is ongoing, and the Premier League's facilities are among the best of any sports league. As of 2019, there are 36 all-seater club grounds in England with a capacity of 25,000 or more, and two in Scotland. The largest is Manchester United's Old Trafford, which has a capacity of approximately 75,000, plus 3 further club grounds with a capacity of greater than 60,000 (all in London).

=== Cricket grounds ===
English cricket grounds are smaller than the largest in some other countries, especially India and Australia, but the best of them have been modernised to a high standard, and two new international grounds have been built in recent years. The largest English cricket ground, Lord's in London, is internationally regarded as the "home of cricket". Other cricket stadiums in England include The Oval, Headingley, Old Trafford Cricket Ground, Edgbaston and the Trent Bridge Ground.

=== Club rugby grounds ===
Rugby union and rugby league clubs are generally poorer than their cricket and football counterparts. Some clubs have good all seater grounds in the 10,000–25,000 capacity range; some have older grounds which are still partly terraced; and others play in council-owned joint-use stadia (e.g. the KC Stadium). Some clubs (mostly rugby union ones) rent stadia from football clubs. After the Rugby Football League stipulated that all Super League club stadia must meet minimum standards rugby league has seen a marked rise in the quality of the sports venues with many clubs re-locating to new purpose-built facilities or renovating their current grounds.

=== Golf courses ===
The Belfry in the English Midlands has hosted the Ryder Cup more times than any other site. Wentworth Club near London used to hold two European Tour events each season, but now hosts just one.

=== Athletics stadiums ===
The provision of athletics stadiums in England is very poor compared to most other developed countries. The main reason for this is that it is not considered acceptable to ask football or rugby fans to sit behind an athletics track. This means that athletics stadiums have to be separately financed and this can only be done with public funds, which have not been forthcoming on a large scale. The largest athletics stadium built in the UK between the Second World War and the 2010s, the 38,000-capacity City of Manchester Stadium built for the 2002 Commonwealth Games, was reconfigured for football-only use after that event. The largest existing stadium then became the 25,000-seat Don Valley Stadium in Sheffield. Prior to the 2012 Summer Olympics, London's largest athletics venue was Crystal Palace, which has just 15,500 permanent seats. It has since been superseded by the Olympic Stadium, now known as London Stadium, which was initially built as an 80,000-seater for the 2012 Olympics. The venue was reduced to 60,000 seats following the Games after the London organising committee accepted West Ham United's bid to take over the stadium. As part of the downsizing, movable seating was added to allow optimal configurations for both athletics and football. There are two Athletic stadiums in Birmingham, the Alexander Stadium (12,700 capacity) which is home to UK Athletics, and the National Indoor Arena (14,150) which is also used for other events. The Alexander Stadium is being expanded to a 40,000 capacity stadium in preparation for the 2022 Commonwealth Games, which are being hosted in Birmingham, with the Alexander Stadium as the main venue.

=== Indoor arenas ===
In England there is no indoor sport capable of attracting five-figure attendances on a regular basis, and this restricts the development of large indoor arenas. Nonetheless, a number of 10,000+ seater arenas have been built in recent years and more are planned. These facilities make most of their income from pop concerts, but they occasionally stage boxing matches and other sporting events. The largest is the Manchester Evening News Arena in its eponymous city, with a capacity of over 20,000 for court events. The O_{2} in London (the former Millennium Dome), reopened in 2007, contains an arena that seats 17,500, but can be reconfigured to seat more than the MEN Arena and the National Indoor Arena in Birmingham which can seat 14,150. There are some specialist ice hockey and basketball arenas, but they only seat a few thousand spectators.

== Student sport ==
University sport dates back to 19th century codification of collegiate games at the University of Oxford and University of Cambridge and their early varsity matches, which played a role in the development of modern sports and the spread of British sport around the world. Today, student sport has significant participation across universities and colleges, ranging from student-run intramural sports within universities, to varsity matches with rival universities, and inter-university competitive sports organised by British Universities and Colleges Sport. The largest inter-university sports tournament in Europe, the Roses Tournament (often just called 'Roses') is contested between Lancaster University and the University of York annually.

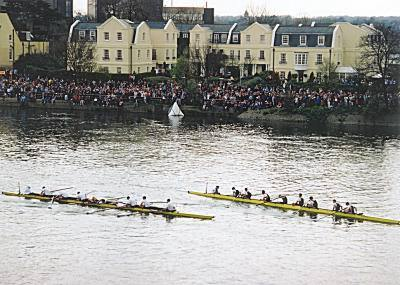
The Boat Race

While universities have significant sports facilities, there is no system of sports scholarships. However, students who are elite standard competitors are eligible for funding from bodies such as UK Sport on the same basis as anyone else. The university most focused on sports provision is Loughborough University. Budding professionals in the traditionally working class team sports of football and rugby league rarely go to university. Talented youngsters in the more middle class sports of cricket and rugby union are far more likely to attend university, but their sports clubs usually play a greater role in developing their talent than their university coaches. Some sports are attempting to adapt to new conditions in which a far higher proportion of English teenagers attend university than in the past, notably cricket, which has established several university centres of excellence.

== School sport ==
Public schools played a significant role in the development of modern sports, including through English public school football games, which shaped university sport and British sports that spread worldwide.

Today, the leading body for physical education in England is the Association for Physical Education. Sportsmark is Sport England's accreditation scheme for secondary schools. The scheme recognises a school's out of hours sports provision.

== See also ==
- Commonwealth Games England
- List of national sports teams of England
- Sport in Bedfordshire
- Sport in Cornwall
- Sport in Leeds
- Sport in London
- Sport in Birmingham
- Sport in Manchester
- Sport in Nottingham
- Sport in Sheffield
- Sport in Sussex
- Sport in the United Kingdom
