= Swim England =

National governing body for swimming and similar water sports in England

- Category: Sports governing body
- Membership: Affiliated swimming clubs
- Founded: 1869
- Affiliation: British Swimming
- Affiliation date: 2014
- Headquarters: SportPark
- Location: 3 Oakwood Drive, Loughborough, Leicestershire, LE11 3QF
- Chairperson: Richard Hookway
- CEO: Andy Salmon
- Operating income: £20.8 million (2013)

Official website
- www.swimming.org
- Other key staff: 20,000 Volunteers; 255 Staff
- (England)

Swim England, formerly the Amateur Swimming Association, is the national governing body for swimming, diving, water polo, open water swimming, and synchronised swimming in England. It forms part of Aquatics GB, a federation of the national governing bodies of England, Scotland (Scottish Swimming), and Wales (Swim Wales). These three are collectively known as the Home Country National Governing Bodies.

== History ==
The first governing body for swimming to ever be established in the world, it was previously known as the 'Amateur Swimming Association' and established in 1869, with headquarters at Harold Fern House in Loughborough. It was registered as a company on 18 May 1982. It moved in April 2010, along with British Swimming, to SportPark at Loughborough University.

The ASA underwent a rebranding exercise in 2008 including a new logo and name of the asa. After negative reaction the logo was retained but the organisation returned to using The ASA in text form.

On 3 March 2017, a new strategy was released for swimming within England. Part of that was to again re-brand The ASA to its current name 'Swim England'. At the same time Jane Nickerson was announced as the organisation's new chief executive officer.

In March 2024 a review, commissioned by Swim England in early 2023, found that there was widespread abuse and discrimination at all levels of the sport and that the governing body had threatened whistleblowers.

== Function ==
=== Clubs ===
Swim England supports over 1,200 affiliated swimming clubs through a National/Regional/and sub-regional structure. It endeavors to ensure every athlete, regardless of age or experience, belongs to a club that provides the best possible support and environment. Swim England had introduced a Quality Mark for clubs, formally called 'Swim 21 Accreditation', now known as ‘SwimMark Accreditation’.

=== Safety ===
In October 2015, Swim England partnered with Water Babies and Splash About International to introduce new national guidelines for baby and toddler safety in swimming pools. The guidelines were published by the British Standards Institution and aimed to set industry-wide standards for swimming lessons and underwater photography practices.

=== Domestic Competitions ===
Swim England organises competitions throughout England, from age-group to elite level. The Age Group and Youth Championships are aimed at younger swimmers aged between 11 and 17 years and can attract more than 1,600 participants, whilst the SwimEngland (also known as SE, previously the ASA), National Championships and Summer Meets and the British Swimming National Championships are aimed at the elite swimmers.

Swim England also organizes the English talent programme that puts in place performance opportunities for swimmers to develop their skills and potential.

=== International Competitions ===
Swim England nominates the manager for the teams sent to international competitions. Andi Manley named as Head Coach for the Glasgow 2026 Commonwealth Games.

=== Participation ===
Swim England operates a Learn to Swim award scheme based on the National Plan for Teaching Swimming. Swimmers within the Swim England programme work their way through 7 stages where fundamental swimming skills are learnt, with progression then expected to be made through stages 8, 9, and 10 where swimmers learn how to train; club swimming; Diving (sport); rookie life guarding; Synchronised swimming; or water polo.

Swim England is not a provider of swimming facilities, but aims to act as a catalyst and facilitator to ensure suitable facilities, with appropriate access and programmes, are provided to meet the needs of the community and aquatic clubs.

Swim England operates certification and education programmes for teachers, coaches and officials. It has created the UK Coaching Framework and e-learning programmes, designed to ensure the ASA has an appropriately skilled workforce for the whole swimming industry. Its education is provided by its Institute of Swimming.

== Structure ==
Swim England operates through eight regions within England (East, East Midlands, London, North

East, North West, South East, South West and West Midlands). These are all independent

legal entities not owned by Swim England but affiliated to Swim England through its

regulations

- North East
- North West
- West Midlands
- East Midlands
- East
- South West
- London
- South East

Swim England's income for the year to 31 March 2009 was £11.4 million, its largest sources of income being government grants (e.g. from Sport England) and revenue from its swimming award scheme.

== Swimming championships ==
Swim England holds three different indoor national swimming championships: one for Age Group swimmers (11- to 14-year-old boys and 11- to 13-year-old girls); one for Youth swimmers (15- to 18-year-old boys and 14- to 18-year-old girls) and one for Masters (age 25 years old plus) usually in July/August. Often the championships are merged. They also hold open water nationals each year. The following table shows the 'Open' Championships.

Year	Dates	Venue	Notes
1986	31 May – 2 June	Coventry	Commonwealth Games Trials
1987	29 July – 2 August	Crystal Palace	European Championships Trials
1988	27–31 July	International Pool, Leeds	
1989	12–16 July	Coventry	
1990	26–29 July	Crystal Palace	
1991	1–4 August	International Pool, Leeds	
1992	11 - 14 June	Ponds Forge, Sheffield	
1993	10–13 June	Ponds Forge, Sheffield	European Championships Trials
1994	28–31 July	Crystal Palace	
1995	??–23 July	Coventry	
1996	??–?? July	International Pool, Leeds	
1997	??–?? July	Crystal Palace	
1998	??–?? July	Ponds Forge, Sheffield	Commonwealth Games Trials
1999	??–?? July	Ponds Forge, Sheffield	European Championships Trials
2000	??–?? July	Ponds Forge, Sheffield	Olympic Games Trials
2001			
2002	28–30 June	Coventry	
2003	18–20 March	Aquatics Centre, Manchester	
2004	16–18 July	Aquatics Centre, Manchester	
2005	4–9 August	Ponds Forge, Sheffield	Commonwealth Games Trials
2006	1–6 August	Ponds Forge, Sheffield	
2007	27 July – 1 August	Ponds Forge, Sheffield	
2008	10–13 July	Picton Pool, Liverpool	
2009	28 July – 1 August	Ponds Forge, Sheffield	
2010	18–21 August	Sunderland Aquatic Centre, Sunderland	Commonwealth Games Selection Meet
2011	14–17 June	Ponds Forge, Sheffield	Final World Championship Qualification Meet
2012	20–23 June	Ponds Forge, Sheffield	Final Olympic Games Qualification Meet
2013	30 July – 4 August	Ponds Forge, Sheffield	
2014	5–10 August	Ponds Forge, Sheffield	
2015	4–9 August	Ponds Forge, Sheffield	
2016	1–5 August	Ponds Forge, Sheffield	
2017	13–17 December	Ponds Forge, Sheffield	Switched places with 'Winter Meet', ran long course due to Commonwealth Trials.
2018	14–16 December	Ponds Forge, Sheffield	
2019	31 July - 4 August	Ponds Forge, Sheffield	Swim England National Summer Meet
2020	29 July - 2 August	Ponds Forge, Sheffield	Cancelled due to “Coronavirus Outbreak”
2021	14 - 18 April	London Aquatics Centre, London	Shortened due to COVID-19 Restrictions
2022	5 - 9 August	Ponds Forge, Sheffield	Swim England National Summer Meet
2023	2 - 6 August	Ponds Forge, Sheffield	Swim England National Summer Meet
2024	29 July - 3 August	Ponds Forge, Sheffield	GoCardless Swim England National Summer Meet

== Sponsorship ==
In 2009 British Swimming announced a £15 million, 6-year sponsorship deal with British Gas, to cover the Home Country Associations too.
