= Jennifer Ann Gray =

British swimmer and swimming coach

Jenny Gray MBE
Personal information
- Full name: Jennifer Ann Gray
- Nickname: Jenny Gray
- Nationality: British
- Born: 11 January 1950 (age 76) Slough, England

Sport
- Sport: Swimming
- Club: Reading Royals

Jennifer Ann Gray MBE (born 11 January 1950) is a British former synchronised swimmer and coach from Slough. She is President of the Reading Royals Artistic Swimming Club. She has been a member of both LEN (Ligue Européenne de Natation) and FINA Technical Synchronized Swimming Committees and contributed to the 2010 edition of the FINA Synchronised Swimming manual for judges, coaches and referees.

== Honours and awards ==
Gray was appointed Member of the Order of the British Empire (MBE) in the 2016 Birthday Honours for services to synchronised swimming. She is a member of the Swim England Hall of Fame.

== Publications ==
- Synchronized Swimming (Know the Game) (Random House, 1977).
- Coaching synchronized swimming: Figure transitions (Standard Studio, 1993).
