= Pontefract Library =

Public library in Pontefract, West Yorkshire, England

Coordinates: 53.691°N 1.312°W

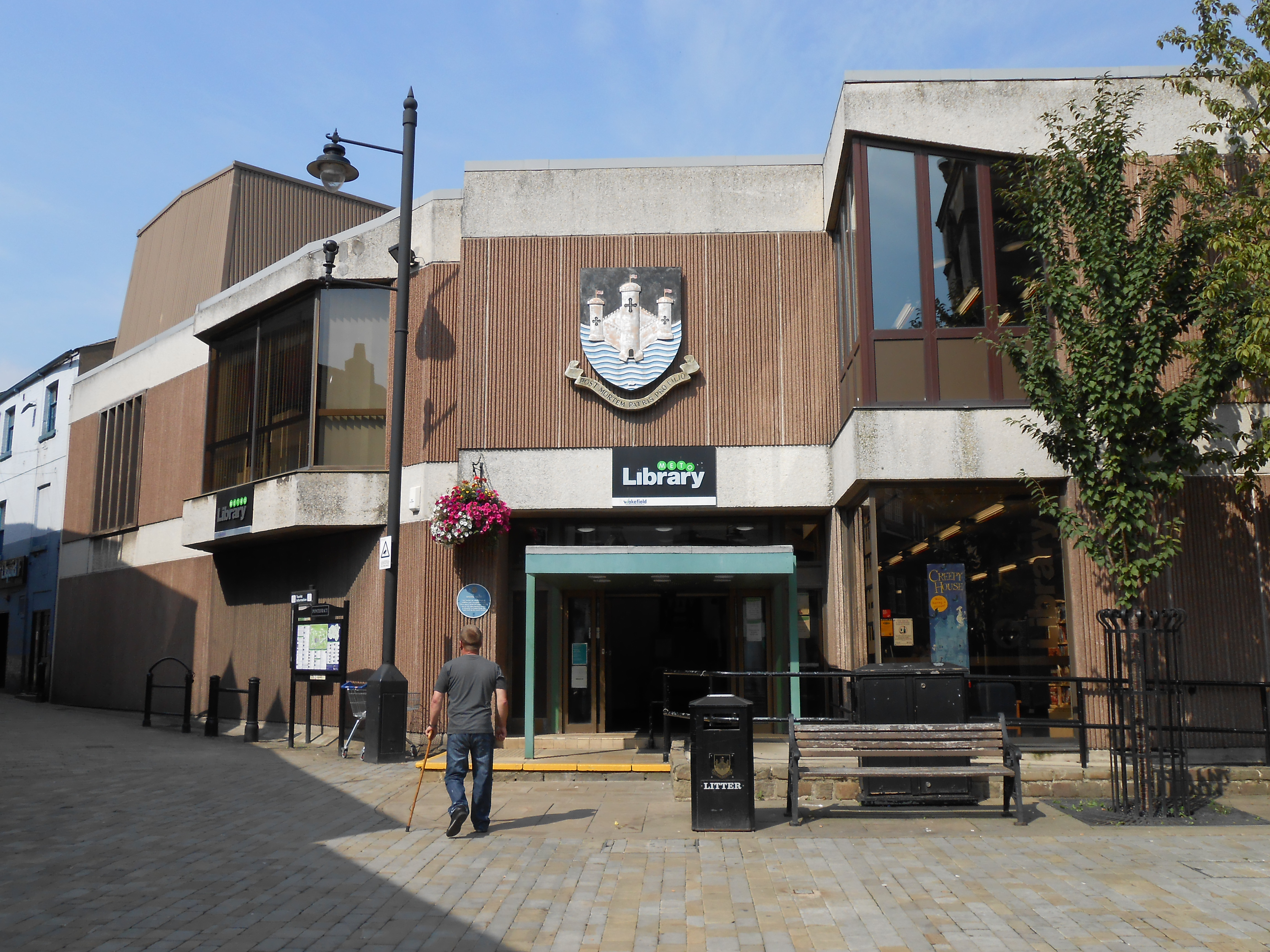
Entrance to Pontefract Library with the town and former borough coat of arms above

Pontefract Library is a public library in Pontefract, West Yorkshire, England. The present day building is notable as one of the last examples of architecture by John Poulson

== History ==
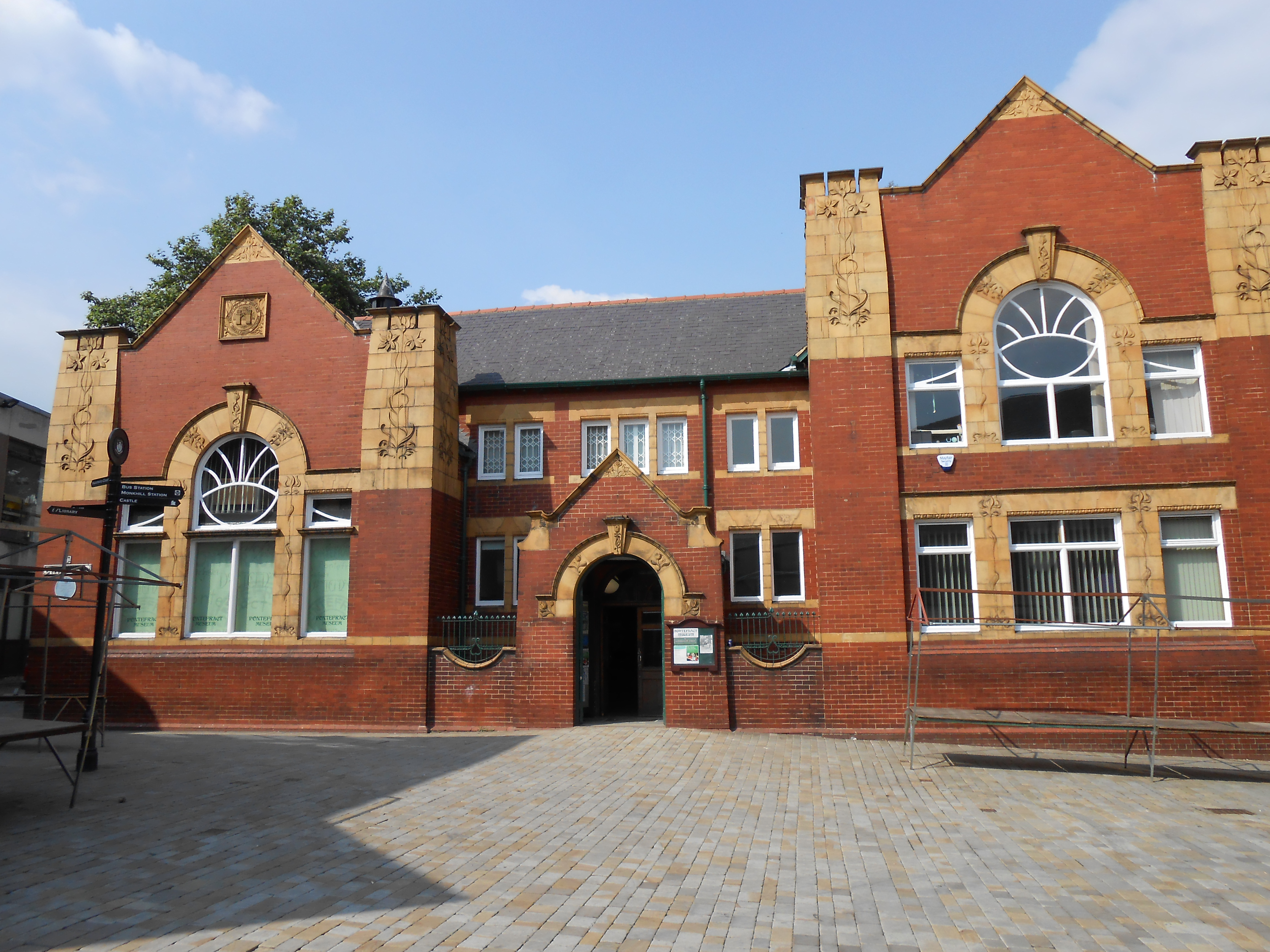
The original library building, now Pontefract Museum

Pontefract's first library opened in 1905 to a design by George Pennington and was built with money from benefactor Andrew Carnegie. This building was designed to a Art Nouveau style and is now the location of the Pontefract Museum.

== Present Library ==
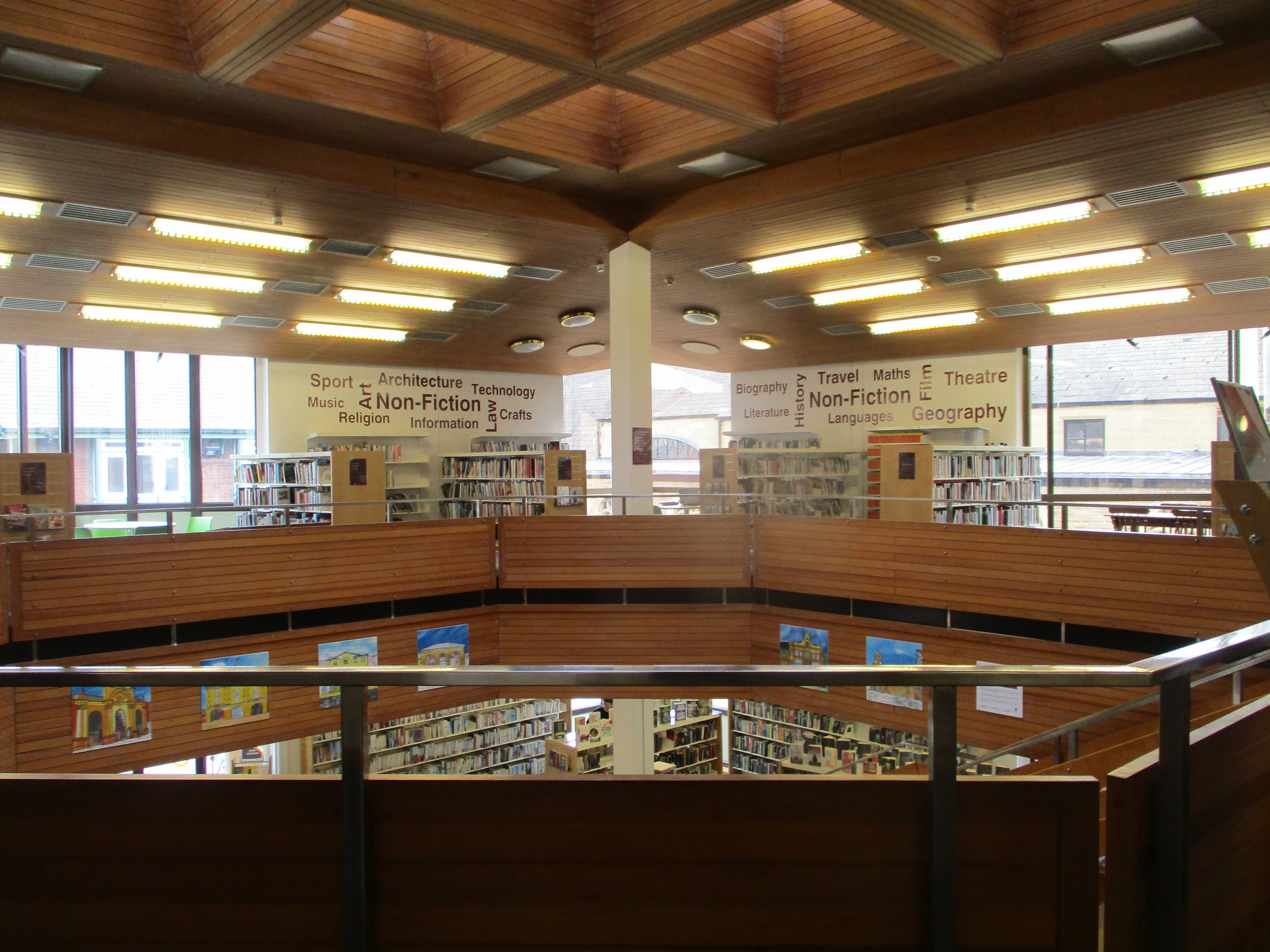
Interior of the library

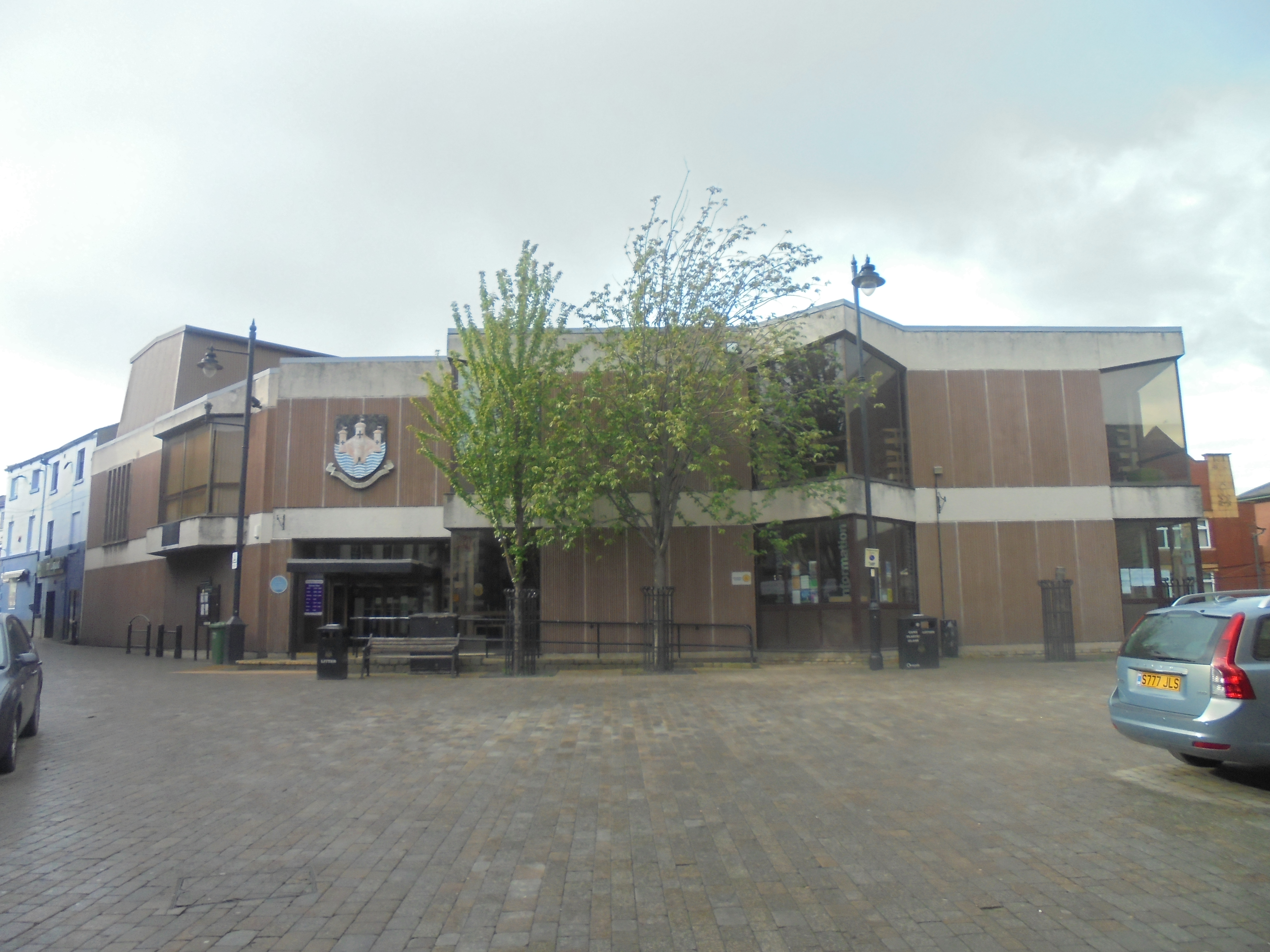
The library in 2019

The present library is situated on Shoemarket and was opened in 1975 to a design by disgraced Pontefract architect, John Poulson. The library was one of Poulson's final buildings, opening two years after his imprisonment for corruption. The building is of two storeys, the first floor being a mezzanine. The interior is clad in wood with a central staircase linking the ground floor with the mezzanine. The ceiling has square skylights situated over the central atrium. The exterior has the characteristic geometric shapes of Poulson's earlier brutalist style buildings, however unlike his earlier works the pre-cast concrete is finished. The windows are tinted to protect the stock and extrude from the building. The library is the only public library in the town.

=== Facilities ===
The library has a study area, a children's library, a local history library and a computer area. There is also a meeting room which can be hired. The mezzanine level has lift access.

== See also ==
- Horsefair flats - Poulson's other major work in Pontefract
