= National Council for School Sport =

The National Council for School Sport is an organisation based in Leicestershire that represents the participation in the UK in school sport, namely competitive sport.

== History ==
It has been based in Nottinghamshire, but is now at Loughborough. Sport, in general, at many schools in England is promoted through the School Sports Partnerships Programme.

== Function ==
The organisation is sport-led, not education-led. It has many contacts at the highest level in UK sport.

== Structure ==
It is the UK's representative on the International School Sport Federation (formed in 1971), a federation of national school sports organisations. The International University Sports Federation governs sport from the age of 17. NCSS joined the ISF in 1975.

People who work on the council of the NCSS have strong connections to the national federations of individual sports. The organisation is about individual sports, more than general sport at schools. It promotes competitive sport.

It is sited at the Youth Sport Trust, headquartered at Loughborough University.

== See also ==
- Association for Physical Education
- Institute of Swimming, at Loughborough
- National Healthy Schools Programme
- UK Coaching Certificate
