= UKCC =

UKCC may refer to:

- United Kingdom Central Council for Nursing, Midwifery and Health Visiting before being renamed into the Nursing and Midwifery Council
- Donetsk International Airport
- UK Coaching Certificate
