= Fios =

Fios may refer to:

- Fíos, a parish in Parres, Spain
- Verizon Fios, bundled home communications service offered by Verizon Communications in the US
- FiOS from Frontier, the former name for Frontier FiberOptic, a bundled home communications service offered by Frontier Communications in the US
- FiOS1, a defunct news-based pay television network carried by Verizon Fios in the New York metropolitan area
- FIoS, after a name denotes Fellow of the Institute of Swimming
- fios, an anticapitalist platform in Galicia, Spain.

== See also ==
- Telefios, a former Scottish Gaelic-language news programme
- Institute of Swimming, a swimming educational organisation based in Loughborough, Leicestershire.
