= Youth Sport Trust =

The Youth Sport Trust is a British government-funded trust that funds and promotes the provision of youth sport in the UK, partly to have an effect on children's health.

== History ==
School sport provision had been reduced in the 1980s, due to disputes about teachers' hours in the 1980s.

The Department of National Heritage was formed in 1992. The Trust was formed in September 1994, to get children taking part in competitive sport.

In 1994 the Prime Minister had originally wanted to introduce new Sport Colleges, as part of the Specialist Schools programme. The sports minister Iain Sproat wanted schools to open ten hours more a week, for sport training, and pay teachers £500 more, for any extra work. The Prime Minister had a personal interest to improve school sport provision. The Central Council of Physical Education (now the Sport and Recreation Alliance was much in favour of these new proposals.

The Trust would run the network of the first trance of, around twelve, Sports Colleges. The Sports Colleges would develop elite athletes. The government was looking at improving provision for university sport, and to train possible elite athletes, but it was decided that this plan would not affect a wide enough group of school children, and the government chose instead to try to get more children participating in any sport, whether elite or not.

There were plans, by the Department of Culture, to include sports results in school league tables, but the Education department was against most of the Culture department's proposals.

The government launched the Physical Education, School Sport and Club Links (PESSCL) in 2002, which the trust supported. In late 2010, its funding was significantly cut. Schools would have to fund their own sport. In February 2012, John Steele, former chief executive of the RFU, took over.

=== Loughborough site ===
The trust was officially established around April 1995 at Loughborough University. It was formed by Loughborough University, the National Coaching Council (UK Coaching), and the Sports Council (UK Sport since 1997), in cooperation with Sir John Beckwith, who formed the trust in 1993.

The trust was housed in the Rutland Building, on the university.

== Function ==
=== Sports Colleges ===
On Wednesday 12 March 1997 education minister Cheryl Gillan added three Arts Colleges and six Sports Colleges to the specialist schools programme. In 1997, the trust was involved with the setting up of the first six Sports Colleges, with a seminar in Crowborough in East Sussex on Monday 23 June 1997.

The Sports Colleges were often a success, with schools producing many more elite athletes, with some joining national sports teams.

=== Institute of Youth Sport ===
In early 1998 the trust set up the Institute of Youth Sport at Loughborough University. The Institute of Youth Sport provided advice on coaching and nutrition for national under-18 sports teams, and there was fitness testing, which provided aerobic and stamina data for medical researchers at the institute.

=== University undergraduates ===
From January 2002 it recruited 250 undergraduates to go into schools to be involved with school sport, to coincide with the 2002 Commonwealth Games. It was sponsored by Nestlé UK, and was called Team Nestlé.

=== Female participation in sport ===
In January 2000 the trust found that football was popular amongst secondary school girls, and basketball. Only few secondary schools allowed girls to play football. Most girls played netball and hockey, and females were deterred from sport by the choice of sports clothing, such as typical short skirts for outdoor sport. The trust found that the females participating in sport had greater self-esteem and self-confidence.

Women were getting heavier every year. In 1950 a typical British woman weighed 8.5 Stone, was a size 12 and measured 36-24-36. By 2000, a typical British woman weighed over 10 stone, was a size 16, and measured 40-33-42.

With the Norwich Union company, it ran the GirlsActive scheme.

=== Sports Colleges Conference ===
It held an annual conference. At the February 2007 conference in Telford, the Prime Minister gave a speech.

=== Gifted and Talented ===
It ran a supportive scheme for children who were talented at sport.

In January 2009 it held a four day National Talent Orientation Camp at Loughborough University, with eighty children from six sports were trained by sprinter Jason Gardener, rower Miriam Batten, cyclist James McCallum, hockey player Jon Bleby, canoeist Ian Wynne, and sailor Jonathan Glanfield. Also taking part was mountaineer Jake Meyer, and sports psychiatrist Steve Peters.

=== UK School Games ===
It set up the UK School Games, first taking place in Glasgow from 7-10 September 2006.

=== National School Sports Week ===
From Monday 28 June 2010, it ran a national week for school sport. Cyclist Chris Hoy visited schools taking part.

=== Schools Sports Partnerships ===
In June 1996 the trust launched a national programme, or strategy, to fund local county councils to provide sports development officers for children. It ran the county sports partnerships for schools, until funding was withdrawn in 2010.

== Structure ==
It receives most of its funding from Sport England.

== See also ==
- National Council for School Sport
- Sportsmark
- Talented Athlete Scholarship Scheme
