= City House =

Platform
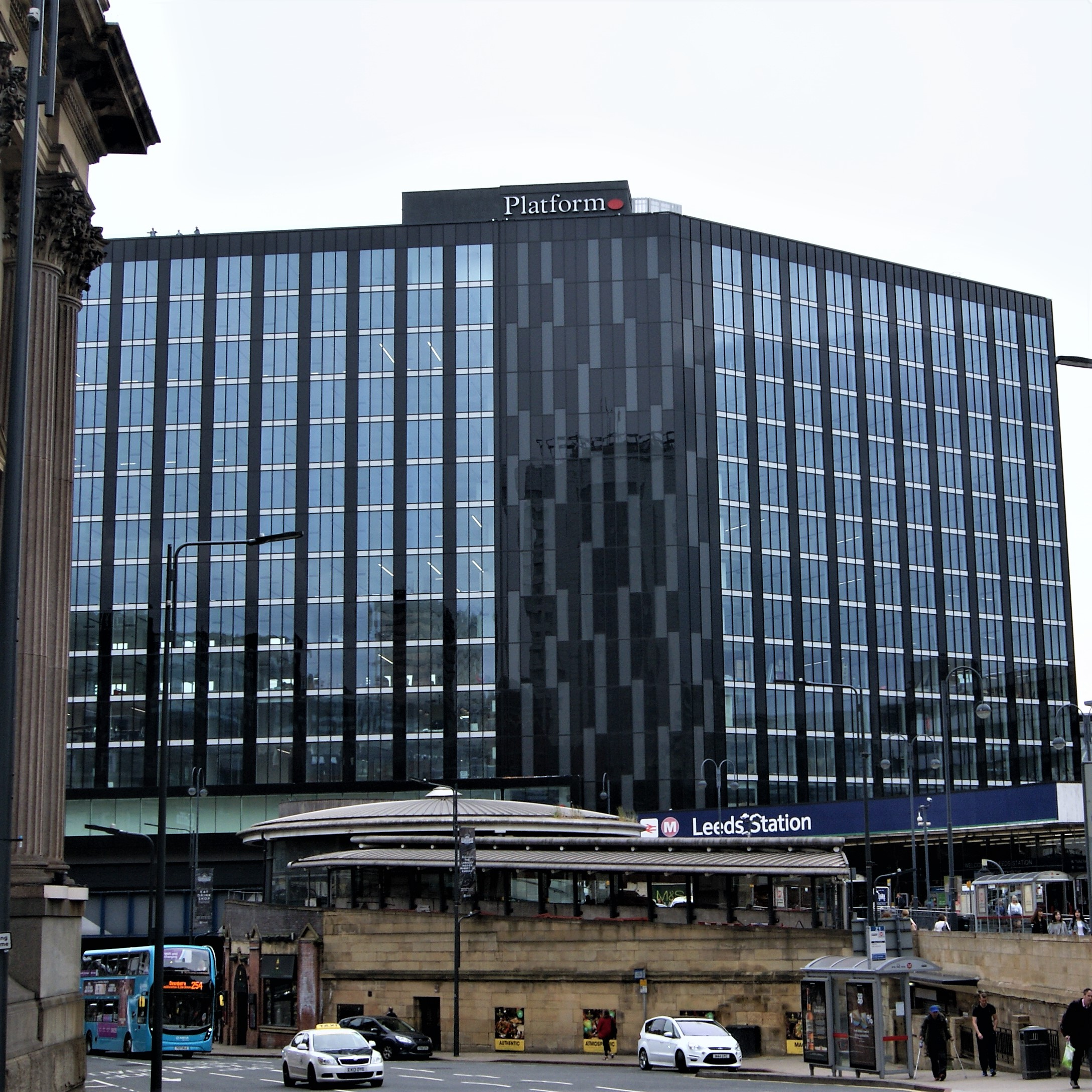
- Platform in 2017
- Interactive map of the Platform area
- Former names: City House; British Railways House

General information
- Location: Leeds, England
- Coordinates: 53.7949°N 1.5468°W
- Completed: 1962
- Renovated: 2017
- Owner: Bruntwood

Height
- Roof: 52 m (171 ft)

Technical details
- Floor count: 12

Design and construction
- Architect: John Poulson
- Developer: British Railways
- Main contractor: Taylor Woodrow

Website
- Platform

Platform, formerly known as City House and British Railways House, is a building over Leeds railway station that was built by Taylor Woodrow in 1962. The buildings were, like many other railway buildings in the UK, designed by the later-derided architect John Poulson who also designed the nearby Leeds International Pool. Upon its construction it was famously lambasted by the poet John Betjeman, who said that the building blocked all the light out of City Square and was only a testament to money, having no architectural merit. He made similar criticism in 1968.

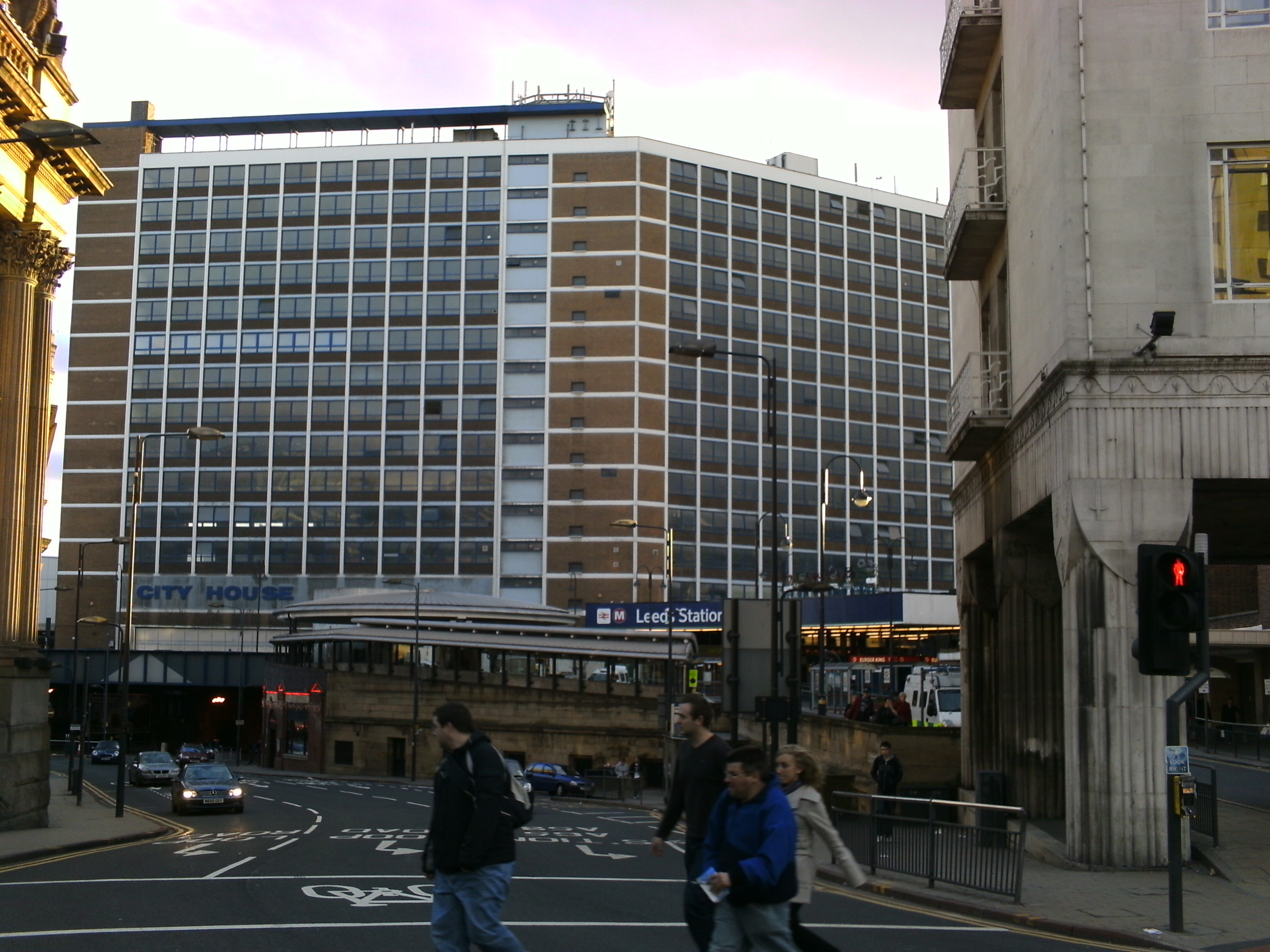
City House in 2008 before recladding

The building was bought by a property company, Kenmore, in 2006 with a view to regenerating what it described as a "tired and dilapidated" building. Kenmore received planning permission in 2008 to extend the building at the back (on the south side) and re-clad it in glazed curtain walling. The scheme was due to be completed in 2009. However Kenmore went into liquidation in 2009 before the scheme had started. A December 2011 photo shows little change from the 2008 image (left).

In 2010 the building was bought by office property company Bruntwood which plans to redevelop it. Planning permission for the refurbishment was granted by Leeds City Council on 13 October 2011. Bruntwood's brochure for the redevelopment claims that:

"our aim is to transform this neglected property into a new high-profile business destination, creating office space to suit all sizes and types of organisation. The exterior of the building will be given a striking new look with contemporary curtain wall glazing. On the inside, the offices will be completely refurbished with the upper floors also boasting unrivalled panoramic views across the city".

Work commenced in October 2015, with the refurbishment completed in 2017. It was renamed Platform.
