= George Pottinger =

William George Pottinger (11 June 1916 – 15 January 1998) was a Scottish civil servant who was imprisoned for corruption in 1974 following the John Poulson trial.

== Education and early career ==
George Pottinger was born in 1916, the elder son of the Reverend William Pottinger, MA, of Orkney. He was educated at George Watson's College in Edinburgh, the High School of Glasgow and the High School of Dundee, before proceeding to further study at the University of Edinburgh, Heidelberg University and Queens' College, Cambridge, where he was awarded a major scholarship and graduated with a BA in Anglo-Saxon Studies and English. In 1939 he entered the Scottish Home Department as an Assistant Principal, and upon his return in 1945 following war service he was successively promoted from Principal to Assistant Secretary (1952–9) and Under-Secretary (1959–62). He also spent time as Private Secretary to three Secretaries of State for Scotland – Arthur Woodburn, Hector McNeil and James Stuart – from 1949 to 1952, and as Secretary of the Royal Commission on Scottish Affairs (1952–4).

== The Aviemore project ==
During the late 1950s, John Maclay, then Secretary of State for Scotland, appointed Lord Fraser of Allander (then Sir Hugh Fraser) to head a survey of tourist resources in the Highlands. Pottinger was put on secondment to Fraser, and in 1962 was asked by ministers to assist the Scottish Tourist Board in preparing a Bill that would allow for a series of investment grants and, potentially, a special tax on overnight accommodation in the area. In a letter to Maclay, he noted that one additional problem inherent in developing the Highlands as a tourist destination was the "shortage of top-class hotel accommodation", and that an "ambitious project which will really strike people's imagination" was now needed. This advice was taken on board: following further rounds of negotiation with various agencies and groups, a £5m redevelopment of Aviemore as a winter sports complex was eventually conceived and approved.

Prompted by the chairman of the construction firm Bovis, Fraser came to understand that the only architect with the "vision" and technical ability to develop the scheme was John Poulson. In order to speed up the process and maintain Poulson's interest, Pottinger was delegated to "work closely" with him. It was at this time that Poulson started giving Pottinger the 'gifts' that would ensure the downfall of both men. According to historian Ian Levitt, these totalled £30,000 over six years from 1963 onwards, and included "two suits of clothing, foreign holidays, a car and a bungalow built to [Pottinger's] specification beside Muirfield Golf Course". Poulson gave Pottinger £20,000 towards the mortgage of his new home, and even paid £655 for the installation of central heating.

== Trial and conviction for fraud ==
Nicknamed 'Gorgeous George' on account of his predilection for "expensive tailoring", Pottinger was attending a black-tie dinner at the Muirfield club when the Fraud Squad's Kenneth Everidge arrived to arrest him at 11pm on 22 June 1973. Already suspended from his Permanent Secretary post at the Department of Agriculture and Fisheries following allegations raised at Poulson's earlier bankruptcy hearing, he was charged with corruption in connection with the award of building contracts. A 52-day trial at Leeds Crown Court followed, with Pottinger as Poulson's co-accused; both were found guilty of fraud on 11 February 1974. The following month, on 15 March, Poulson and Pottinger were each gaoled for five years; but whereas the former received a further seven-year prison term (to be served concurrently with the original sentence), Pottinger had his sentence reduced to four years on appeal later that year. Sentencing Pottinger to gaol, Lord Justice Waller said: "You have let down the honourable service to which you belonged." He was dismissed from the civil service, forfeiting a retirement lump sum, and had his pension cut in half. As a result of his conviction, Pottinger's 1953 Coronation Honours award as Commander of the Royal Victorian Order (CVO) and his 1972 Companion of the Order of the Bath (CB) were both revoked in 1975.

== Later years and publications ==
Following his release Pottinger moved to Balsham in Cambridgeshire, where he died aged 81 in 1998 after collapsing while playing tennis. His published works include The Winning Counter (1971), Muirfield and the Honourable Company (1972), St. Moritz: an Alpine Caprice (1972), The Court of the Medici (1977), and The Secretaries of State for Scotland, 1926-76 (1979), which he drafted while in prison.

== Family ==
In 1946 Pottinger married Margaret (Meg) McGregor; their son Piers was head of the City public relations firm Lowe Bell Financial, later part of Bell Pottinger. His younger brother, Don, was an artist and illustrator.
