= John Poulson =

British architectural designer and businessman

- Born: John Garlick Llewellyn Poulson; 14 April 1910; Pontefract, West Riding of Yorkshire, England
- Died: 31 January 1993 (aged 82); Leeds, West Yorkshire, England
- Occupation: Architect
- Spouse: Cynthia Sykes (m. 1939)
- Children: 2 daughters

John Garlick Llewellyn Poulson (14 April 1910 – 31 January 1993) was a British architectural designer and businessman who caused a major political scandal when his use of bribery was disclosed in 1972. The highest-ranking figure to be forced out due to the scandal was Conservative Home Secretary Reginald Maudling. Poulson served a prison sentence, but continued to protest his innocence, claiming that he was "a man more sinned against than sinning".

== Family and early life ==
Poulson came from a strict Methodist family and inherited a strong faith which stressed the importance of self-help. He did badly at school and at Leeds College of Art but nevertheless was articled to a Pontefract firm of architects, Garside and Pennington. He left to found his own architecture practice with financial backing from his father. He never registered with the ARCUK (Architects' Registration Council of the United Kingdom), later claiming "I was too busy to complete my examinations". Poulson soon began to cultivate contacts in the local borough council and officials at the larger West Riding County Council. Work soon began to arrive and Poulson told friends that he was "on his way". Poulson also became politically involved with the National Liberals, although he never let political differences stop him from making "friends" who were in charge of commissioning public buildings. He was a Freemason.

== Post-war business ==
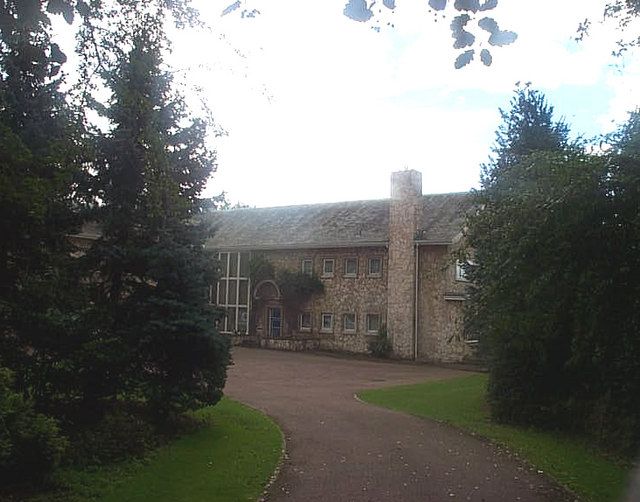
Manasseh, Poulson's former residence

Poulson obtained a medical exemption from wartime service in 1939. The same year he married Cynthia Sykes, whose sister Lorna was married to John King, who many years later was ennobled as John King, Baron King of Wartnaby. He was thus well placed to expand his business throughout the wartime years. He was a workaholic and demanded the same commitment from his staff, dismissing staff who would not work his way. He had his own firm build him a house called Manasseh at a cost of £60,000, helped by building contractors donating services for free in the hope of getting contracts in the future. The house won the Ideal Homes "House of the Year" competition in 1958.

Poulson revolutionised the accepted architectural method of completing a design then handing it over for costing, planning and building. He developed a combined architecture and design practice, an all-in-one service which employed all the separate disciplines in integrated teams. This approach accelerated the development process and reduced costs. In the post-war years, Poulson's business boomed and by the 1960s was one of the largest in Europe. He later admitted that the practice expanded "beyond my wildest dreams" and offices were opened in London, Middlesbrough, Newcastle upon Tyne, Edinburgh, Beirut, and Lagos, Nigeria.

== Local authorities ==
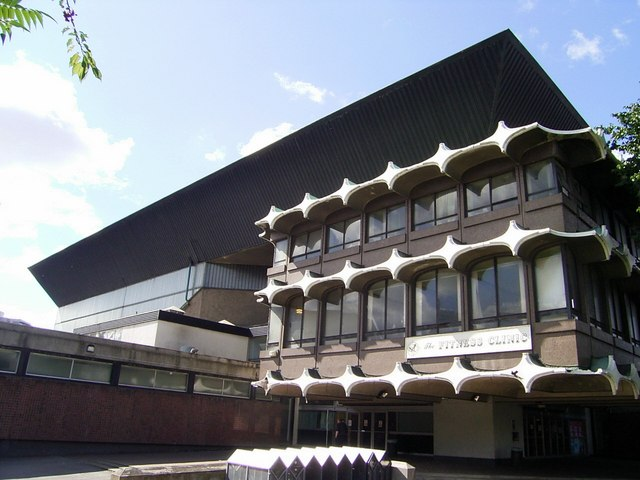
Poulson's Leeds International Swimming Pool, opened in 1966

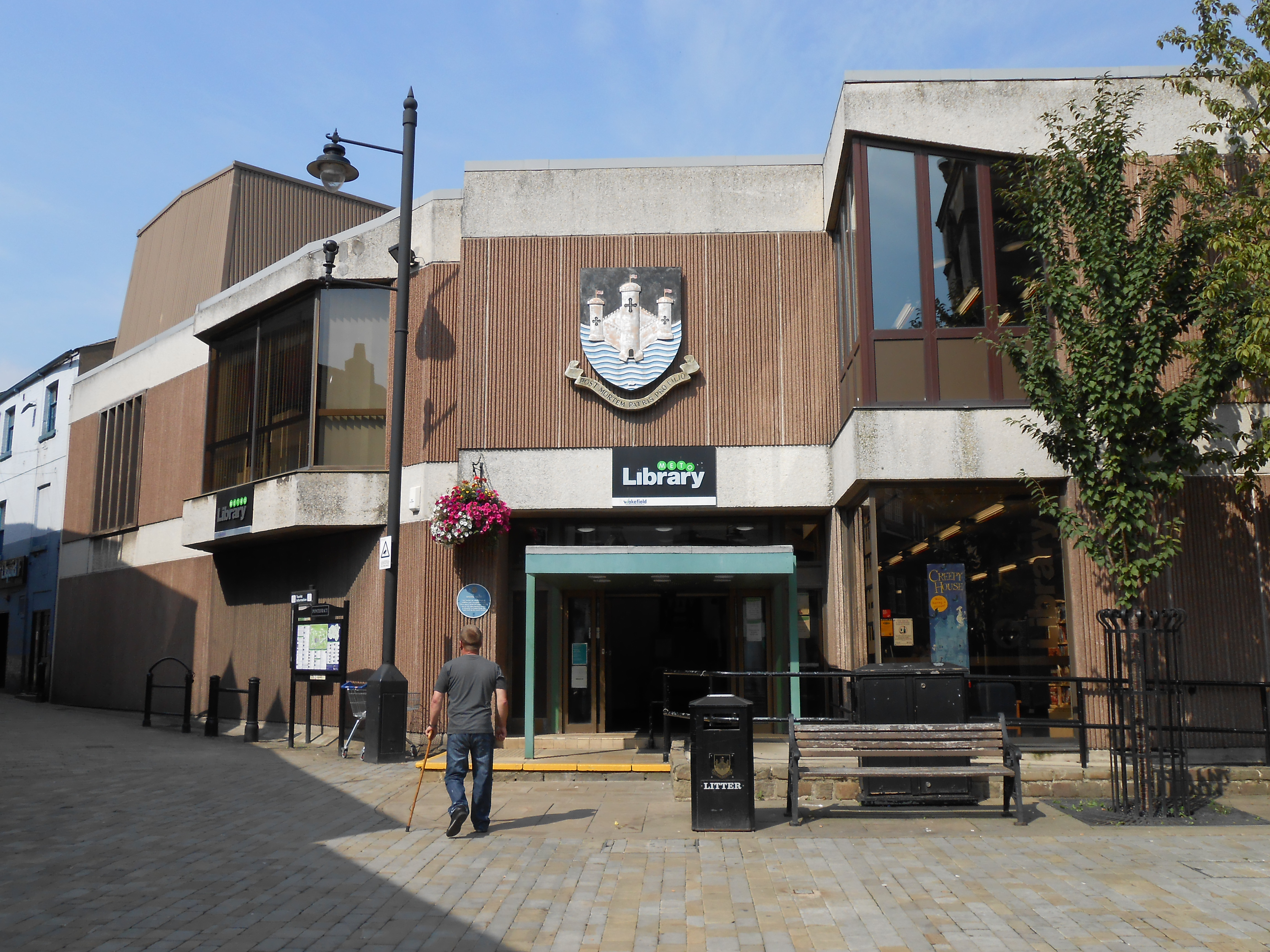
Poulson designed Pontefract Library in his home town. The library opened in 1975.

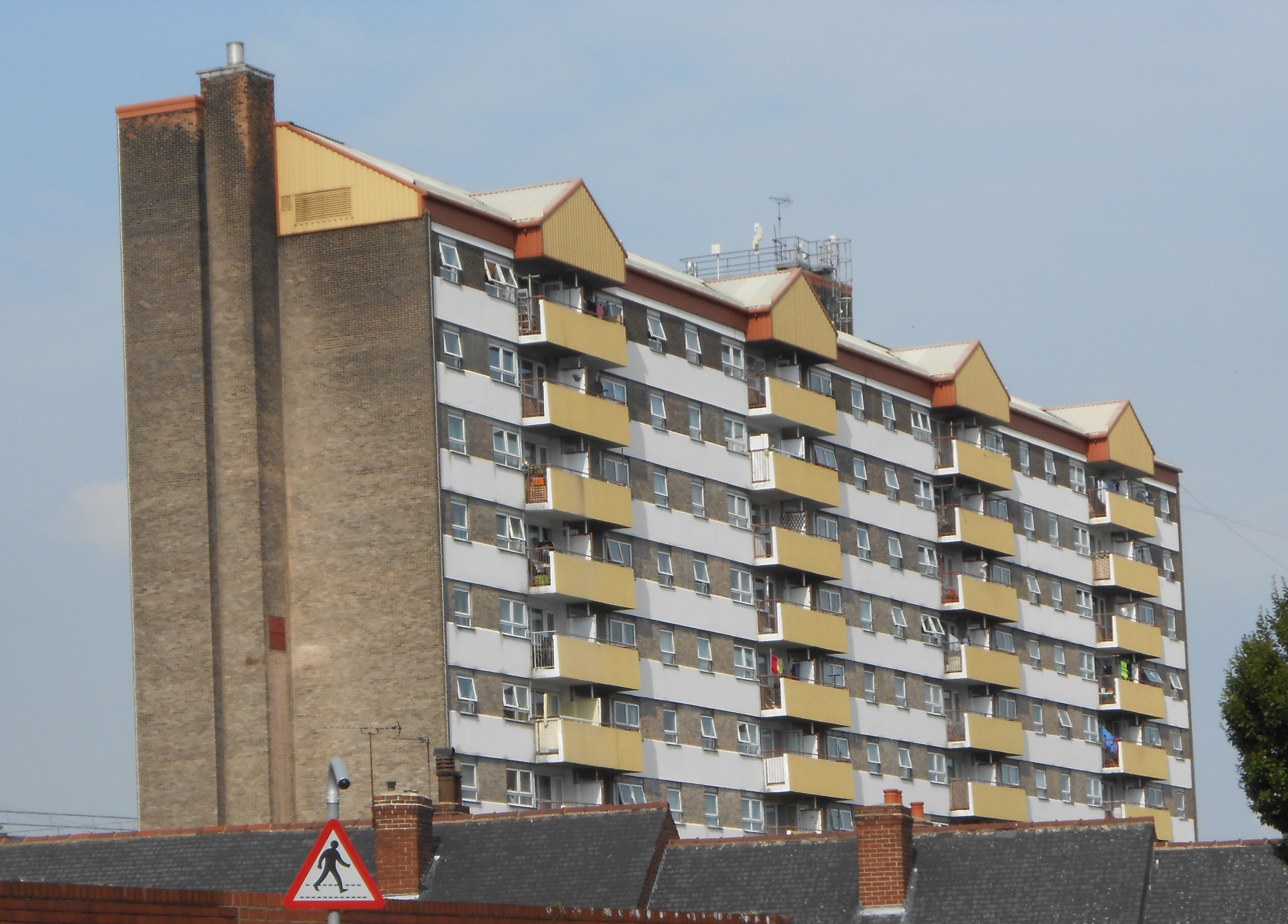
Luke Williams House is the centrepiece to the Horsefair flats in Pontefract, designed by Poulson. The pitched roof was added later

In 1958, the National Liberal MP Sir Herbert Butcher advised his friend Poulson to set up a servicing company to win business for his architect's practice. Poulson established Ropergate Services Ltd., named after the street in Pontefract where he was based. This company also had the advantage of reducing Poulson's tax liability considerably. In the late 1950s, there was a building boom as many local authorities embarked on major building schemes.

In Newcastle upon Tyne, council leader T. Dan Smith's ambition to redevelop Newcastle attracted the attention of the construction firm Bovis which had worked for Poulson. Bovis' managing director suggested formalising links and in February 1962 Smith was appointed as a consultant to the Poulson organisation. This connection was extremely valuable to Poulson as Smith had a network of contacts among other authorities in the north-east, many of whom were also recruited as Poulson consultants. Smith's involvement with the Labour Party reassured many Labour councillors wary of dealing with someone involved in the Conservative-allied National Liberals. Poulson also won other public sector work in the North East, such as Sunderland Police Station.

Poulson also found a useful contact in Andrew Cunningham, a senior figure in both the General and Municipal Workers Union and the Labour Party in North East England. Some of Poulson's largest residential blocks were built in Cunningham's home town of Felling, County Durham. Cunningham was later imprisoned for his dealings with the architect. Poulson's work in Felling consisted of the building of one 16-storey high-rise apartment block with six seven-storey blocks of maisonettes surrounding it. These were approved in 1966. Four of the low-rise maisonette blocks were demolished in 1987 owing to their poor state of repair and tenants dislike of them. Two maisonette blocks and the high-rise block Crowhall Tower remain.

In his home town of Pontefract, Poulson won much local authority work for the then Pontefract Municipal Borough Council, such as the town's library and the Horsefair flats, a high-rise social housing project consisting of four six-storey blocks and one twelve-storey block, constructed between 1963 and 1964, which has proved controversial owing to its proximity to Pontefract Castle.

== Nationalised industries ==
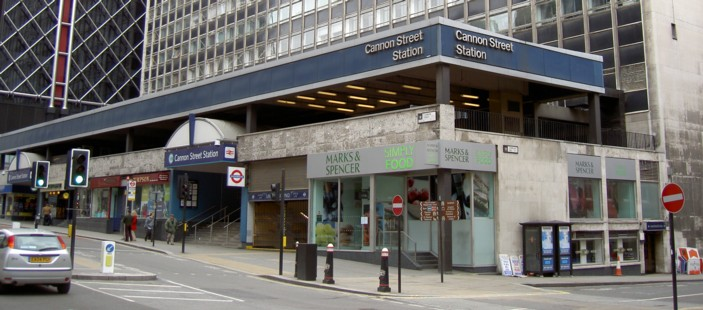
Cannon Street railway station, a Poulson building

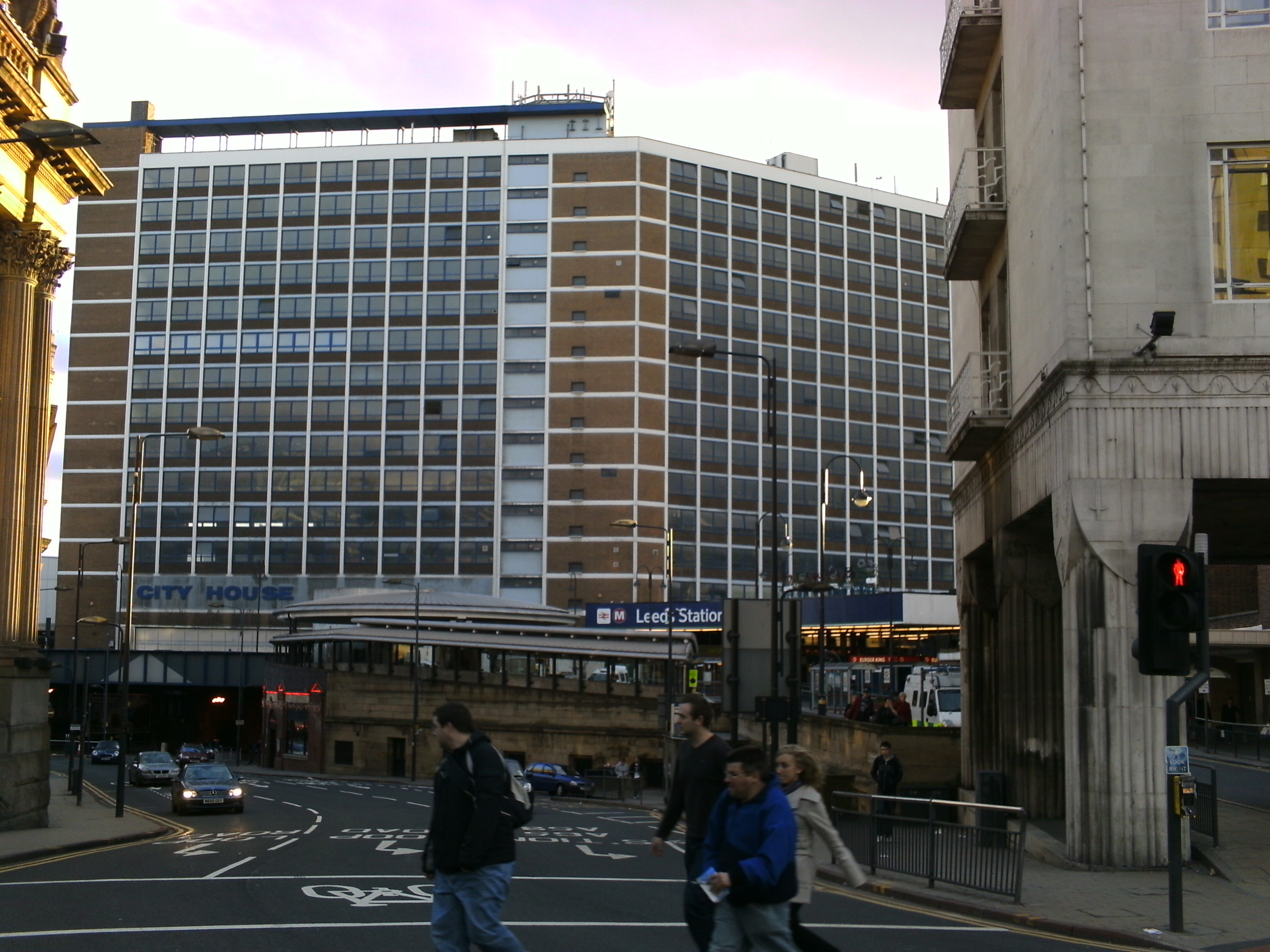
City House (originally British Railways House) over Leeds City railway station was a Poulson building design built in 1962.

Poulson was in a good position to gain commissions from the nationalised industries, partly due to his having offered gifts to many civil servants when they were relatively junior and calling upon them for a return of gratitude years later. As an example, Poulson had met Graham Tunbridge, a railway employee, during the war. After the nationalisation of British Rail, Tunbridge became estates surveyor for its Eastern Region and sent Poulson several contracts for modernisation of stationmasters' homes. When Tunbridge became Estates and Rating Surveyor for BR Southern Region, Poulson moved on to contracts at Waterloo railway station, Cannon Street station and East Croydon station. In return, Poulson had given Tunbridge £8,547 in cash and in kind.

Another beneficial contact was Scottish Office civil servant George Pottinger, who in the late 1950s was put in charge of a £3 million redevelopment of Aviemore as a winter sports complex. Poulson was appointed by Pottinger as architect in charge of the Aviemore project. In return, Poulson gave Pottinger gifts worth over £30,000 over six years.

Poulson's connections with the National Liberals began to give him political advancement in the early 1960s. He was Vice-Chairman of the Executive Committee of the National Liberal Council from 1961 and frequently hosted National Liberal events in London at which he met senior government ministers. He also made contact with the Labour MP Albert Roberts. Roberts was later accused of having "acted inconsistently with the standards of the House of Commons".

== Overseas work ==
Poulson was increasingly interested in obtaining commissions outside Britain in the mid-1960s. This required making more contacts. The Conservative MP John Cordle had extensive contacts in West Africa and after helping on several small contracts, in 1965 became a consultant to Poulson. Cordle admitted that he had received £5,628 from Poulson's business.

== Maudling ==
Another contact was the then Shadow Commonwealth Secretary Reginald Maudling, whom Poulson knew from his National Liberal activities. Maudling was anxious to build up a business career to keep up his income and Poulson needed a big name as chairman of one of his companies, Construction Promotion. In 1966 Maudling accepted an offer to be chairman. In return, Maudling helped to bring pressure on the government of Malta to award a £1.5 million contract for the new Victoria Hospital on Gozo to Poulson.

== Financial trouble ==
Poulson's business model was initially highly successful and, at its apogee, had an annual turnover of £1 million; he himself admitted to being a millionaire. However, it was consuming more contract work than was becoming available, and Poulson resorted to tackling these difficulties by bribing and corrupting local councillors, local authority officials and civil servants at all levels. This was an expensive strategy and Poulson later estimated that he "gave away" about £500,000 in the last few years of his involvement in the business. As part of his attempts to gain attention, Poulson had become a local Commissioner of Taxes.

On 31 December 1969, Poulson was formally removed from control of J.G.L. Poulson and Associates. On 9 November 1971, he filed his own bankruptcy petition, revealing debts of £247,000. The bankruptcy hearings in spring 1972 were assisted by Poulson's meticulous record-keeping which detailed his payments and gifts. Poulson's generosity drew the comment from Muir Hunter QC during the bankruptcy proceedings that "[i]n fact, Mr Poulson, you were distributing largesse like Henry VIII". The bankruptcy hearing also revealed Poulson's love for a lavish lifestyle and his penchant for rubbing shoulders with senior figures in the establishment. This desire to show his financial superiority over others only served to highlight his true character as a lonely, friendless and insecure person. One of Poulson's biggest creditors was the Inland Revenue to which he owed around £200,000. Whilst the Revenue were pressing Poulson for payment of this amount, he was himself presiding over debt hearings in Wakefield in his role as a Commissioner of Inland Revenue.

It swiftly became apparent that Poulson was at the centre of a massive corruption scandal, and in July 1972, the Metropolitan Police began an investigation for fraud. This precipitated the resignation of Reginald Maudling, then Home Secretary, who was notionally in charge of the police.

== Dénouement ==
On 22 June 1973, Poulson was arrested and charged with corruption in connection with the award of building contracts. The trial at Leeds Crown Court lasted 52 days, and cost an estimated £1.25 million. Defending Poulson, Donald Herrod QC said: "He has nothing to live for and his abiding fear is that he will never complete his sentence because of ill health". Donald Herrod later described his client as "hypocritical, self-righteous and perhaps something of a megalomaniac".

Following the trial which was widely reported in the press, he was convicted on 11 February 1974 of fraud and jailed for five years (later increased to seven years). Sentencing him, the judge called Poulson an "incalculably evil man". For his part, Poulson denied the charges, saying "I have been a fool, surrounded by a pack of leeches. I took on the world on its own terms, and no one can deny I once had it in my fist".

Many of his contacts, in particular T. Dan Smith and George Pottinger, were similarly convicted and gaoled, though not the three MPs: it was found that there was a legal loophole through which members of parliament could not be considered as in charge of public funds. The Poulson scandals did much to force the House of Commons to initiate a Register of Members' Interests. A subsequent Select Committee inquiry which reported in 1977 found that all three had indulged in "conduct inconsistent with the standards which the House is entitled to expect from its Members".

After serving periods in Armley Gaol, Wakefield and Oakham prisons, Poulson was released on 13 May 1977 from Lincoln Prison after Lord Longford had appealed on his behalf. Longford had successfully argued that to keep a sick man in gaol was an "indefensible cruelty". His bankruptcy was discharged, with creditors receiving 10p in the pound, in 1980. A condition of the discharge was that half the proceeds of his autobiography would go to his creditors; the resulting book, The Price, gives his side of the corruption scandal and maintains his innocence. Only a few copies of the book remain in circulation as it was withdrawn and pulped by the publishers through fear of libel actions.

Poulson died in the General Infirmary in Pontefract, West Yorkshire, on 31 January 1993. His wife and two daughters survived him.

== Contributions ==
Among buildings designed by Poulson are the City House (1962) and International Pool (1965–1968), both in Leeds, and Forster House in Bradford, which was demolished in 2005 as part of the Forster Square redevelopment. The International Pool in Leeds was closed in 2007 and razed to the ground in 2009. The site is now used for car parking.

In an indirect way, Poulson did make a contribution to the UK's broadcasting culture. A special edition of the investigative ITV series World in Action, The Friends and Influence of John L Poulson, became a cause célèbre in the debate about the power of Britain's television regulators to interfere with broadcast journalism. The Poulson programme was banned by the then regulator, the ITA, even though its members had not seen it. A furious debate followed in which newspapers united in calling for an end to such "censorship".

Granada Television, the makers of World in Action, broadcast a blank screen as a protest against the banning. There was some irony in this: the editor of World in Action was Raymond Fitzwalter, who earlier, as deputy news editor of the Telegraph & Argus in Bradford, had led an investigation into Poulson's activities, which the newspaper published. Eventually, after the film was shown to the ITA, it was transmitted on 30 April 1973, three months late, and under a different title, The Rise and Fall of John Poulson.

The 1996 BBC television drama serial Our Friends in the North, written by Peter Flannery, contains a character, John Edwards (played by Geoffrey Hutchings), who is closely based on Poulson. One of the reasons the production took so long to reach the screen—Flannery had originally written it for the stage in 1982—was the fear of the BBC that Poulson and others fictionalised in the drama might take legal action. In the event, the deaths of Poulson and T. Dan Smith in 1993 finally allowed the production to commence.
