= Institute of Swimming =

British swimming organization

- Abbreviation: IoS
- Formation: 1970s
- Legal status: Non profit company (registration 01759210)
- Purpose: Swimming training education in the UK
- Headquarters: SportPark, 3 Oakwood Drive, Loughborough, Leicestershire, LE11 3QF
- Region served: UK
- Members: Swimming instructors
- Main organ: Board of Directors
- Parent organization: Swim England
- Affiliations: British Swimming, Royal Life Saving Society UK
- Website: Institute of Swimming

The Institute of Swimming is a swimming educational organisation based in Loughborough, Leicestershire.

== History ==
It was known as the Institute of Swimming Teachers and Coaches (ISTC), and was based on Granby Street in Loughborough town centre, and previous to that in the 1990s on Forest Road (B5350) at Dawson House. As the IoS it was previously based at Harold Fern House in the town.

The ISTC was formed by the ASA in the 1970s. It became the Institute of Swimming on 15 July 2004. The organisation was incorporated as a company on 6 October 1983.

== Function ==
It supplies the main training for the Amateur Swimming Association (ASA). Swimming schools and coaches can be registered with the organisation so long as they have adequate coaching qualifications. This register is available to the public searching for qualified swimming instructors. In this respect it is similar to a trade association for swimming teachers. Comprehensive insurance is provided as part of membership.

It published the magazine Swimming (when the ISTC), now called Swimming Times, published with the ASA.

=== Professional qualifications ===
Fellows of the Institute of Swimming can use the F. I. S. T. C designation after their name.

== Structure ==
In the 1980s it was headquartered at Lantern House, 38 Leicester Road in Loughborough. By 2001 it was at ISTC House, 41 Granby Street in Loughborough.

The current headquarters are SportPark, 3 Oakwood Drive, Loughborough, Leicestershire, LE11 3QF.

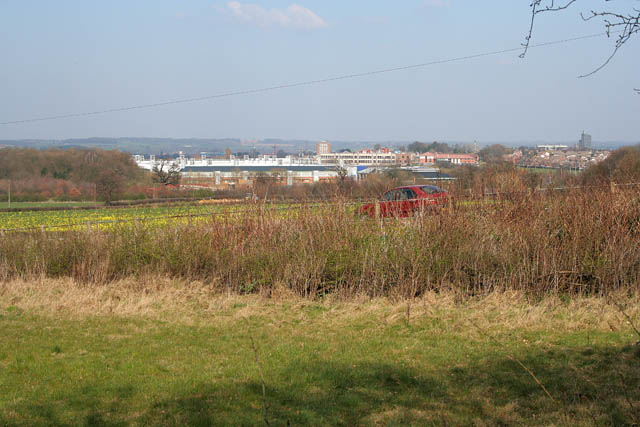
View of University Of Loughborough , next to the Institute

== See also ==
- UK Coaching Certificate (UKCC)
- Institute of Scientific and Technical Communicators (also similarly known as ISTC)
