= Horsefair flats =

Building complex in West Yorkshire, England

Coordinates: 53°41′34″N 1°18′26″W

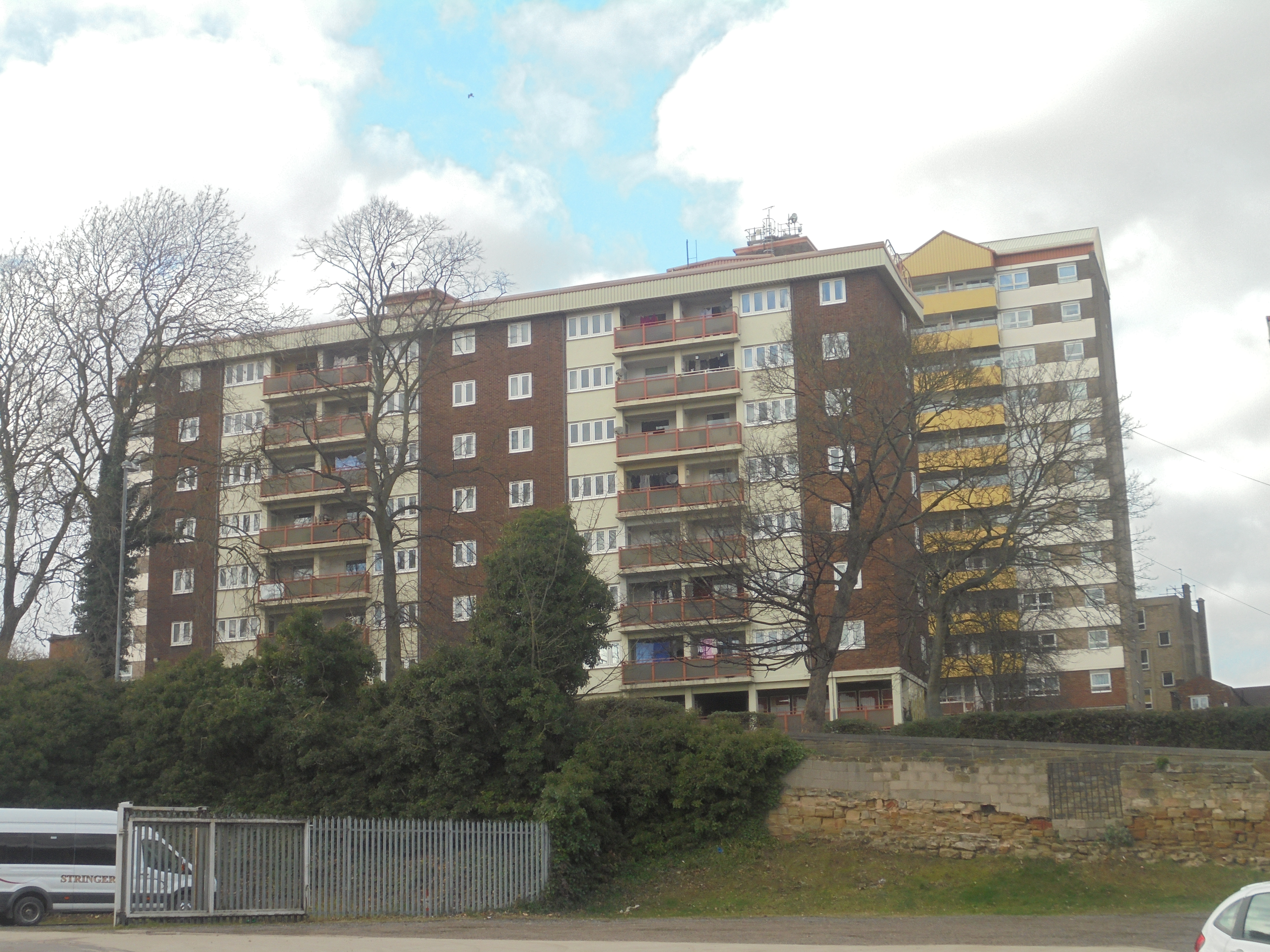
George Wright House with Luke Williams House behind

The Horsefair flats are a complex of medium and high rise maisonettes and flats in Pontefract, West Yorkshire, England. The scheme was approved in 1956 and designed by John Poulson. The blocks were refurbished in 1999.

== Layout ==
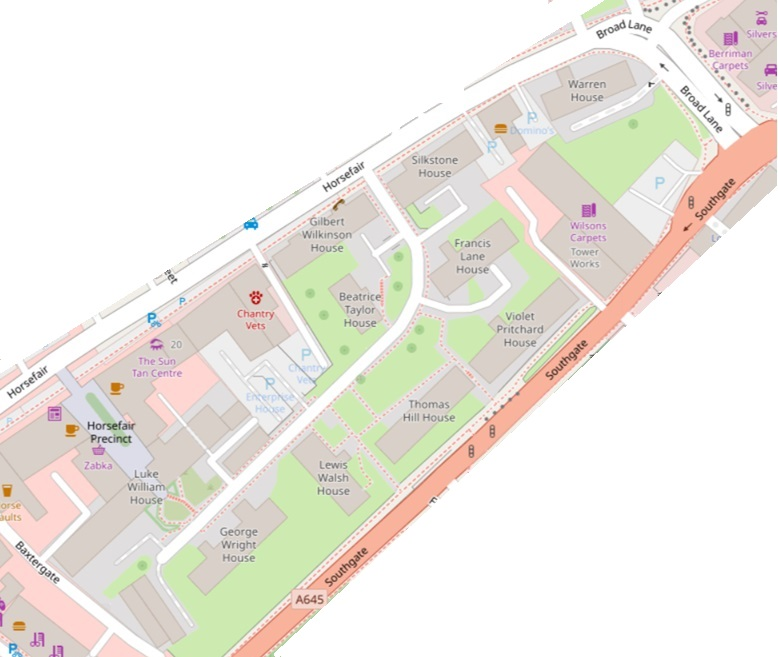
Plan of the Horsefair flats

The complex lies between Horsefair and Southgate, with a small precinct , containing four retail units connecting the complex with Horsefair. There are eleven blocks in total compromising flats and maisonettes; mostly deck access.

Luke Williams House forms the central block and can be accessed from Horsefair via the precinct. Luke Williams House has a community room.

At eight storeys high, George Wright House is the second tallest block; this is situated between Luke Williams House and Southgate.

== Today ==
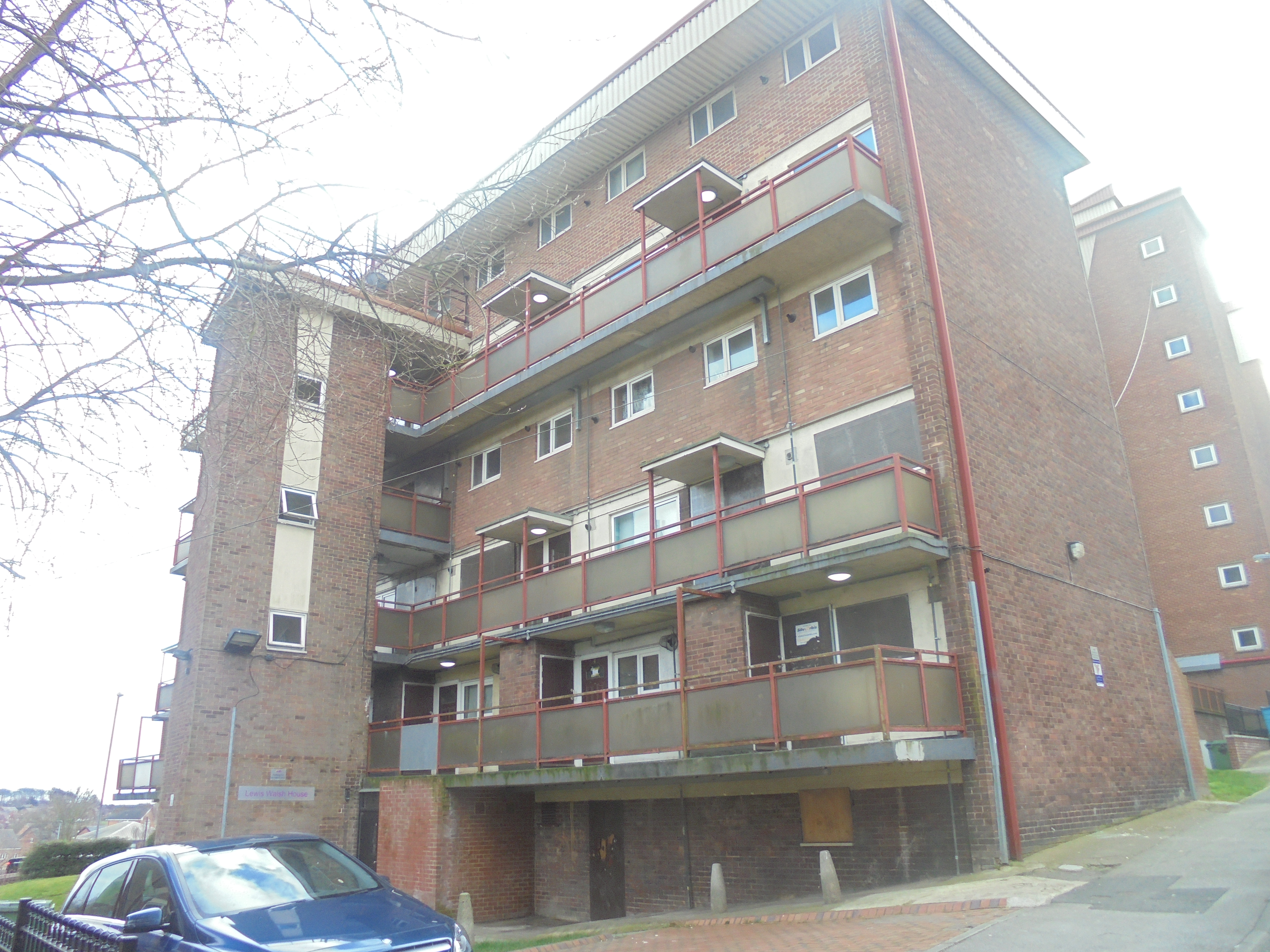
Lewis Walsh House showing abandoned properties

The complex is largely unchanged since refurbishment in 1999. Ownership of the complex has since been transferred to WDH. The housing association have since ceased to issue new lets in Lewis Walsh House with many maisonettes now vacant.

== Other ==
Luke Williams House is used for high-rise fire training by West Yorkshire Fire and Rescue Service.

== 2024 partial demolition proposals ==
In 2024 a proposal was put forward to demolish some of the low rise maisonette blocks to the eastern side of the development, which includes Warren House, Silkstone House, Francis Lane House and Voilet Pritchard House reducing the overall block numbers from ten to six.

== Gallery ==
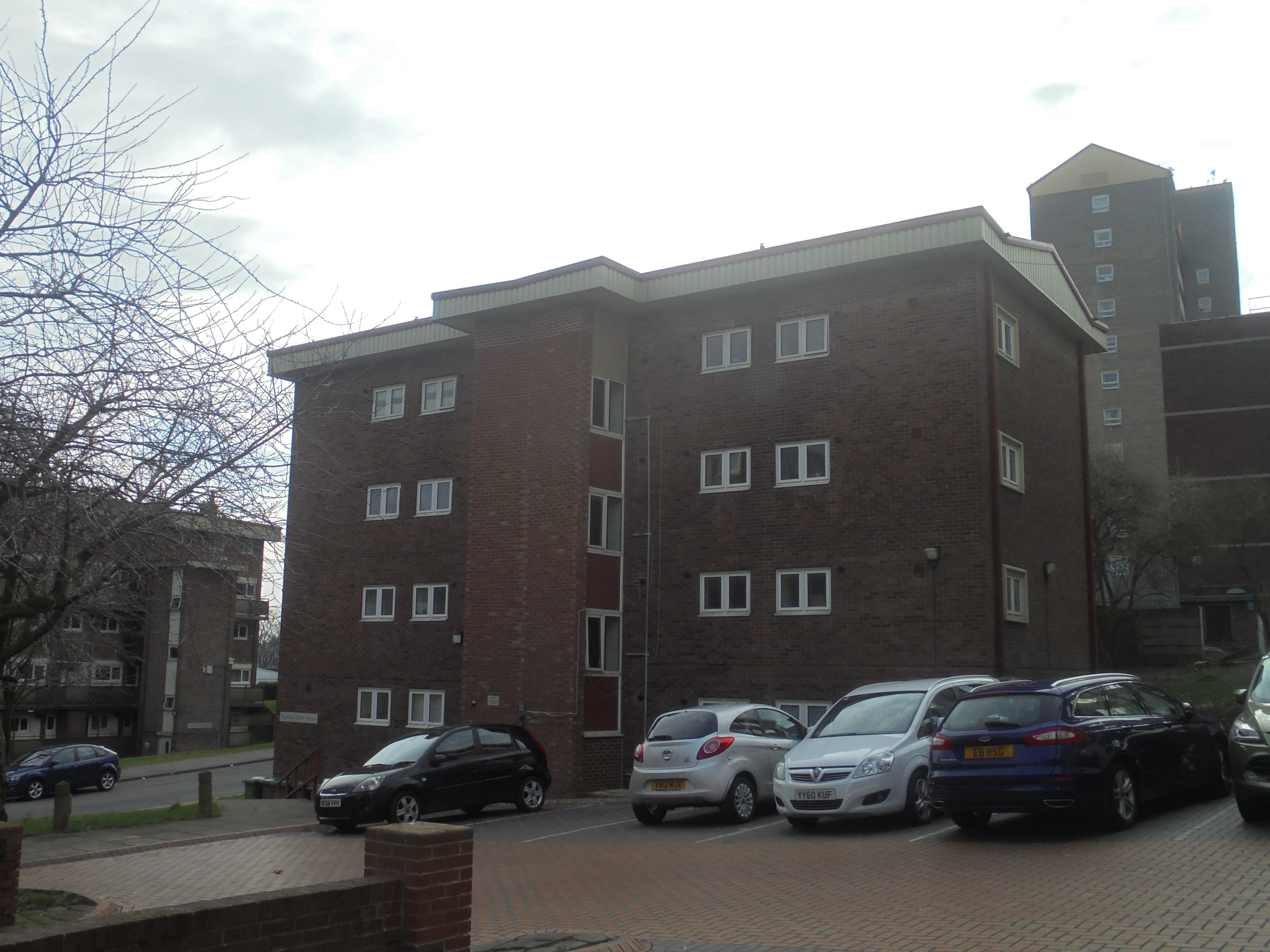
Beatrice Taylor House

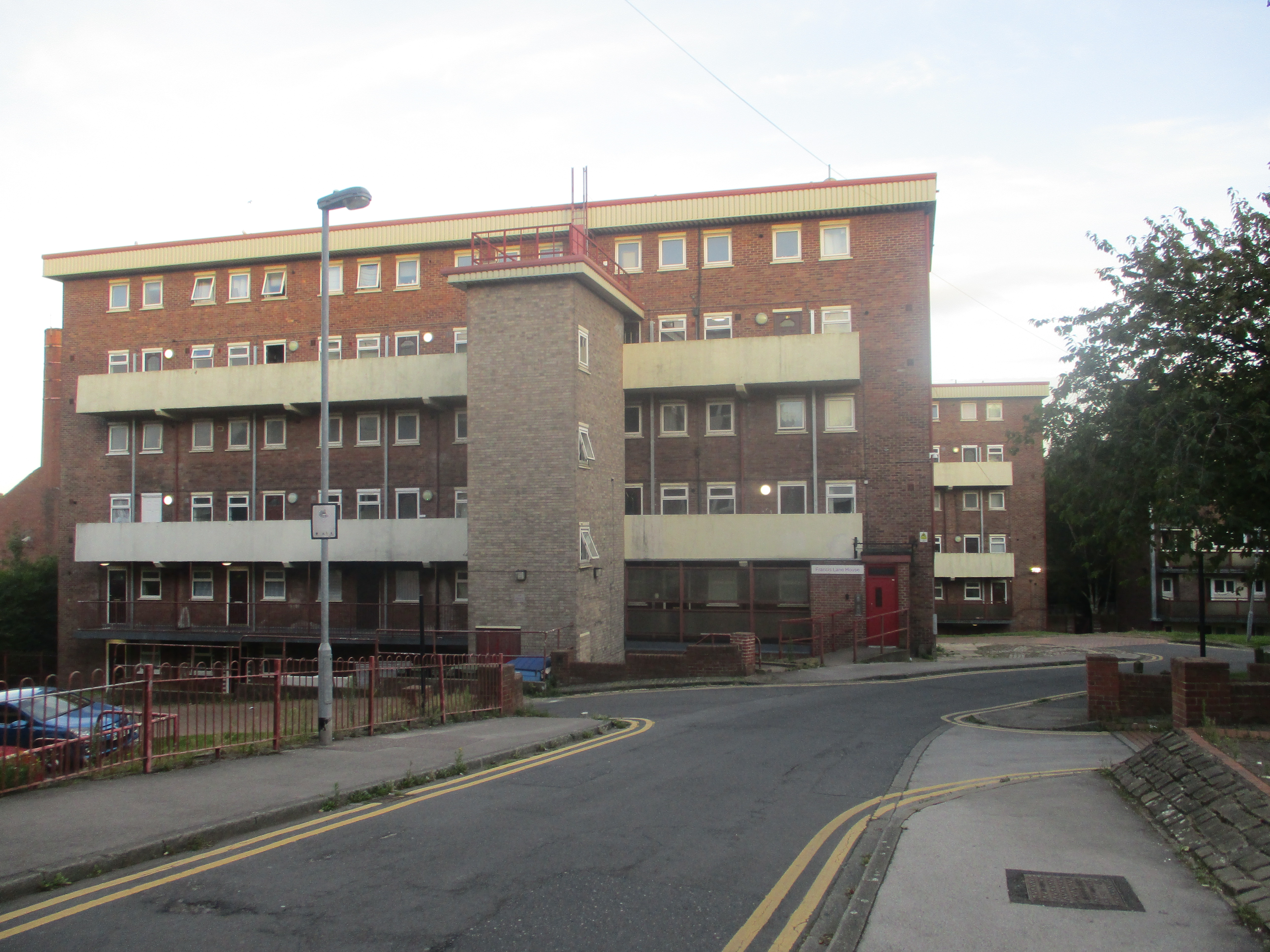
Francis Lane House

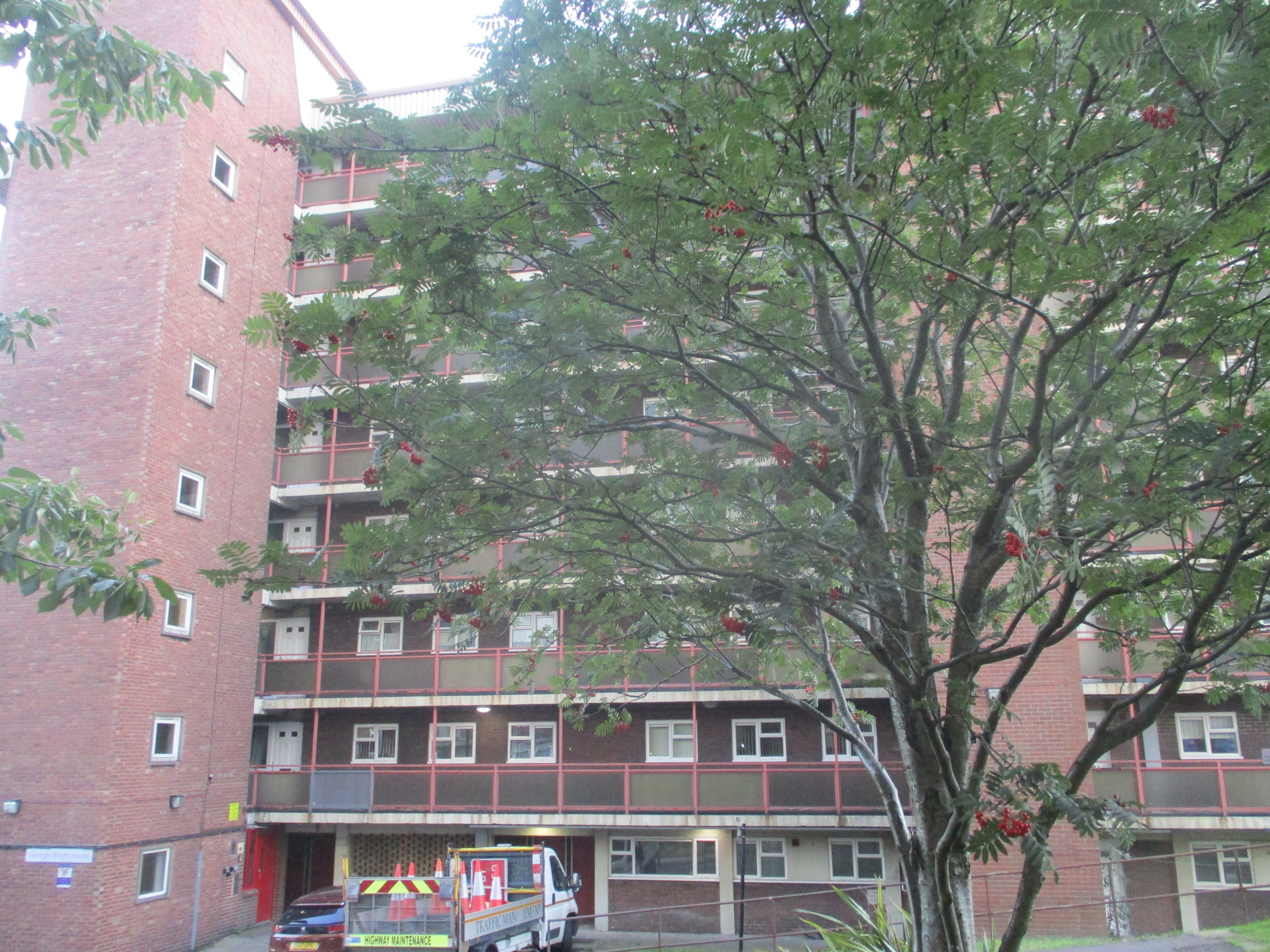
George Wright House

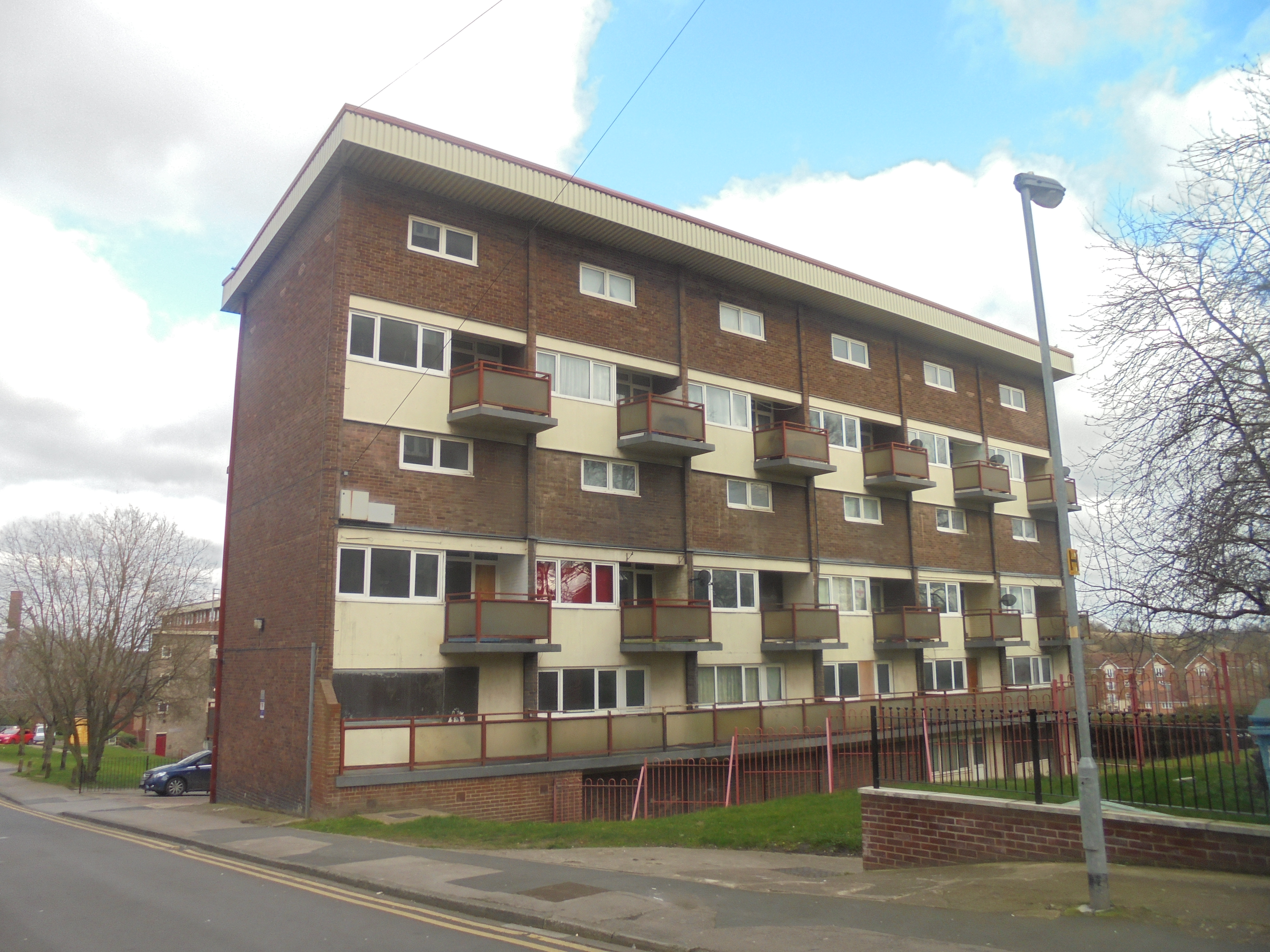
Lewis Walsh House

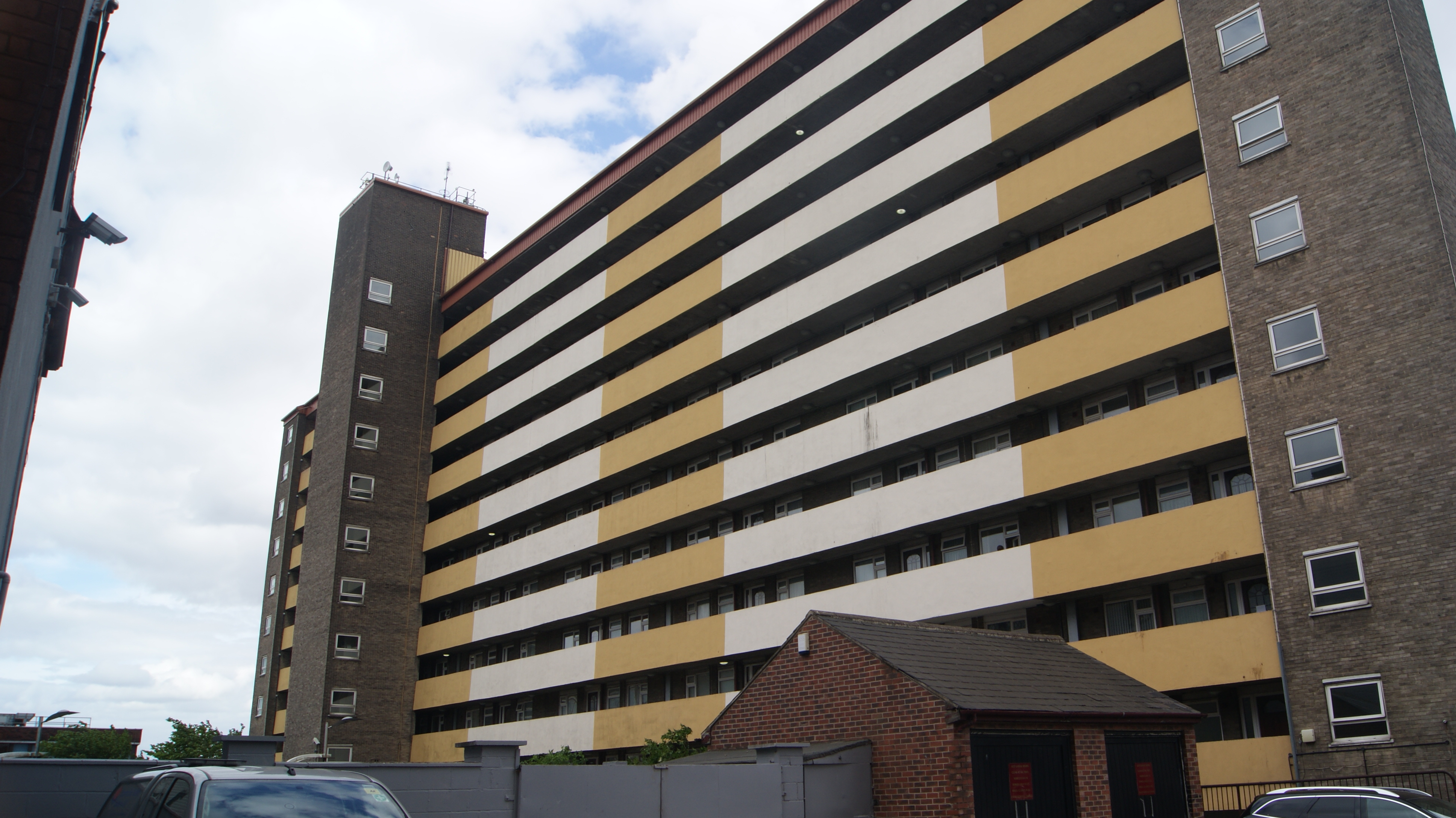
Luke Williams House

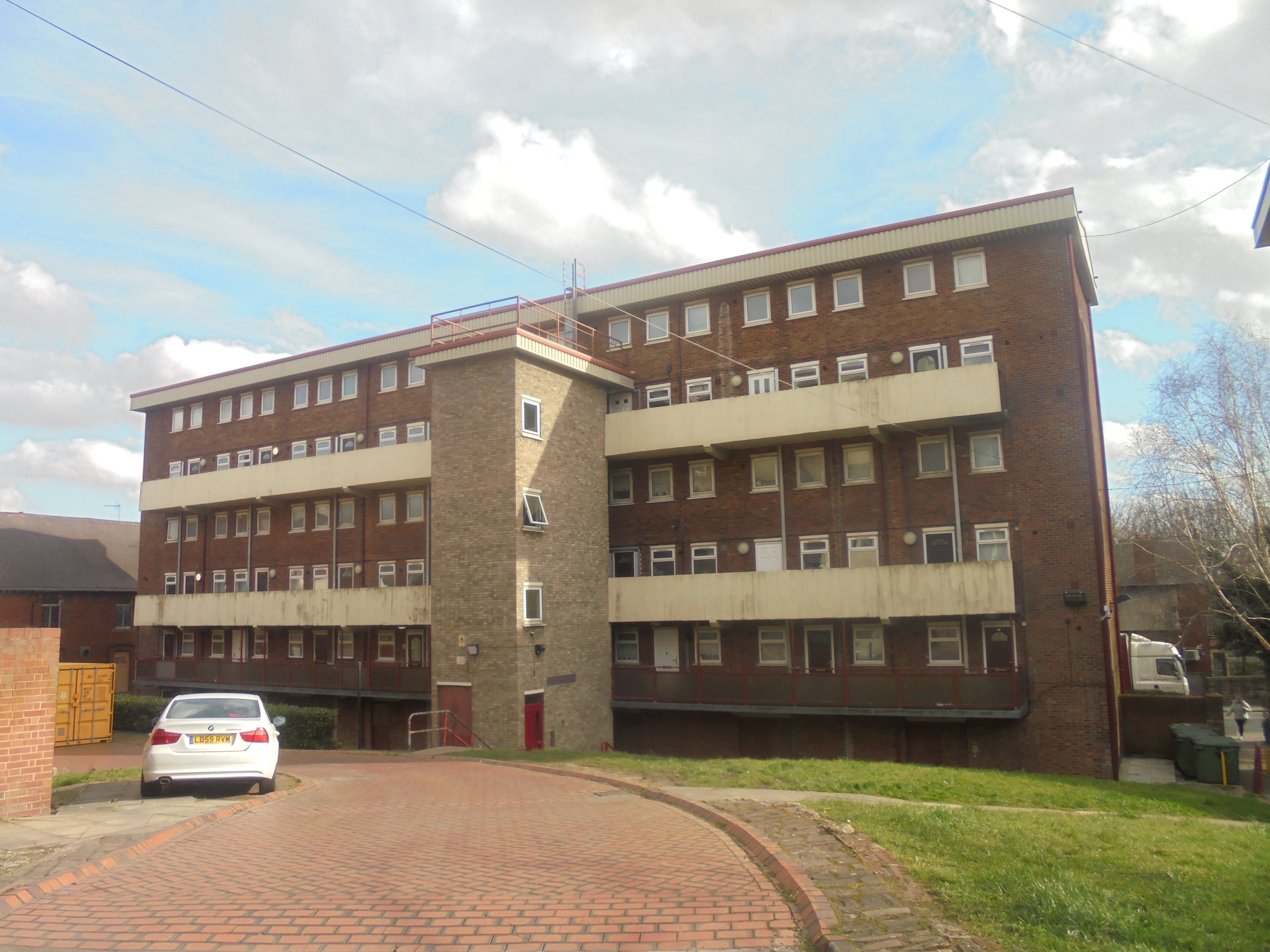
Violet Pritchard House

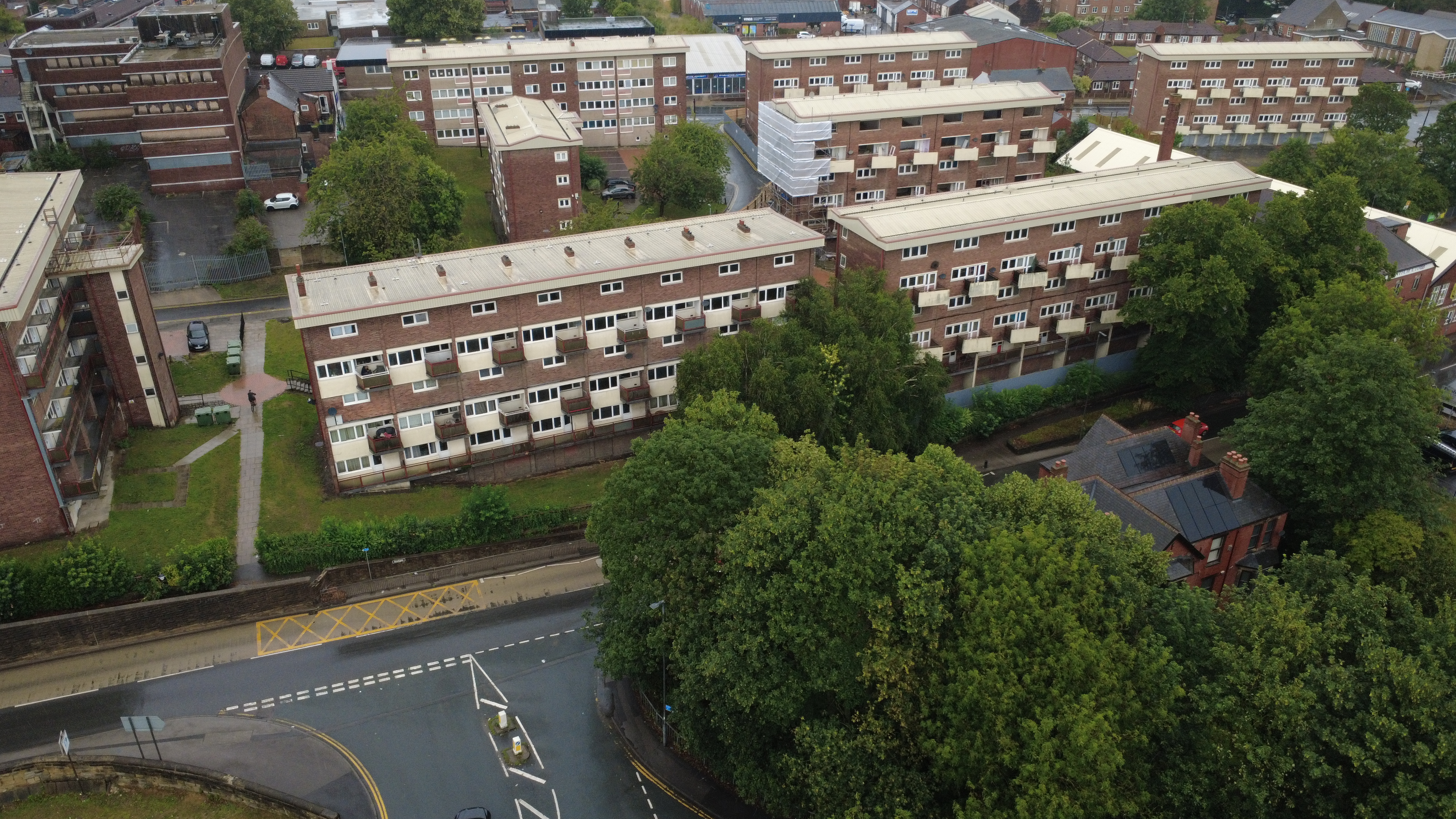
Some of the maisonette blocks
