= Talented Athlete Scholarship Scheme =

The Talented Athlete Scholarship Scheme, known as TASS, is a university and sixth-form bursary scheme, and a sports scholarship, largely in England, and at Cardiff University and Swansea University in Wales, and at the University of Strathclyde in Scotland.

It is a scheme of Sport England (UK government-funded) to find and support prospective talented athletes.

== History ==
Over five hundred athletes are supported by this scheme, in around thirty sports (in high performance sport). The scheme began in April 2004, by UK Sport, with nine athletes.

There was £6m of funding, with £1,000 to £3,000 per athlete. It was largely officially launched in September 2004. Roger Draper was chief of Sport England.

When UK selected for Olympics in July 2005, more money was allocated. At the 2006 Commonwealth Games, 21 people who had been funded through the scheme won medals.

From September 2014 it was operated by Sport England.

=== 2012 Olympics ===
On September 28 2004 an additional scheme for 100 athletes a years was launched, known as TASS 2012. It was for ages 12 to 18, costing £1m a year, with £10,000 per athlete, to train for the 2012 Olympics.

== Operation ==
It is run by Northumbria University in Newcastle upon Tyne. Athletes are over 16. Prospective athletes are nominated by the national governing body for that sport. These athletes are at the top of their Sport England Talent Pathway, and must be in full-time education.

Athletes are nominated only by the governing bodies, and cannot make individual applications. The scheme is largely delivered by English universities. The scholarship is worth up to £3,500 a year.

Some athletes can also be funded (additionally) through UK Sport.

=== Scheme funding ===
The scheme is part of the SportsAid network, and receives funding from the National Lottery.

== Other scholarships ==
Individual universities also offer their own individual scholarships, in addition, such as Bath, and Loughborough.

== See also ==
- British Olympic Association
- English Institute of Sport
- Student loans and grants in the United Kingdom
- Youth Sport Trust, also provides funding for athletes aged 12 to 18
