= Harold Fern =

British president of swimming governing body

Harold Fern (20 April 1881 – 21 August 1974) was the British president of swimming's world governing body, FINA from 1936 – 1948. He was a member of the British Olympic Association.

== See also ==
- List of members of the International Swimming Hall of Fame
