= Leeds International Pool =

Former swimming pool in Leeds, England

Coordinates: 53.798283°N 1.555577°W

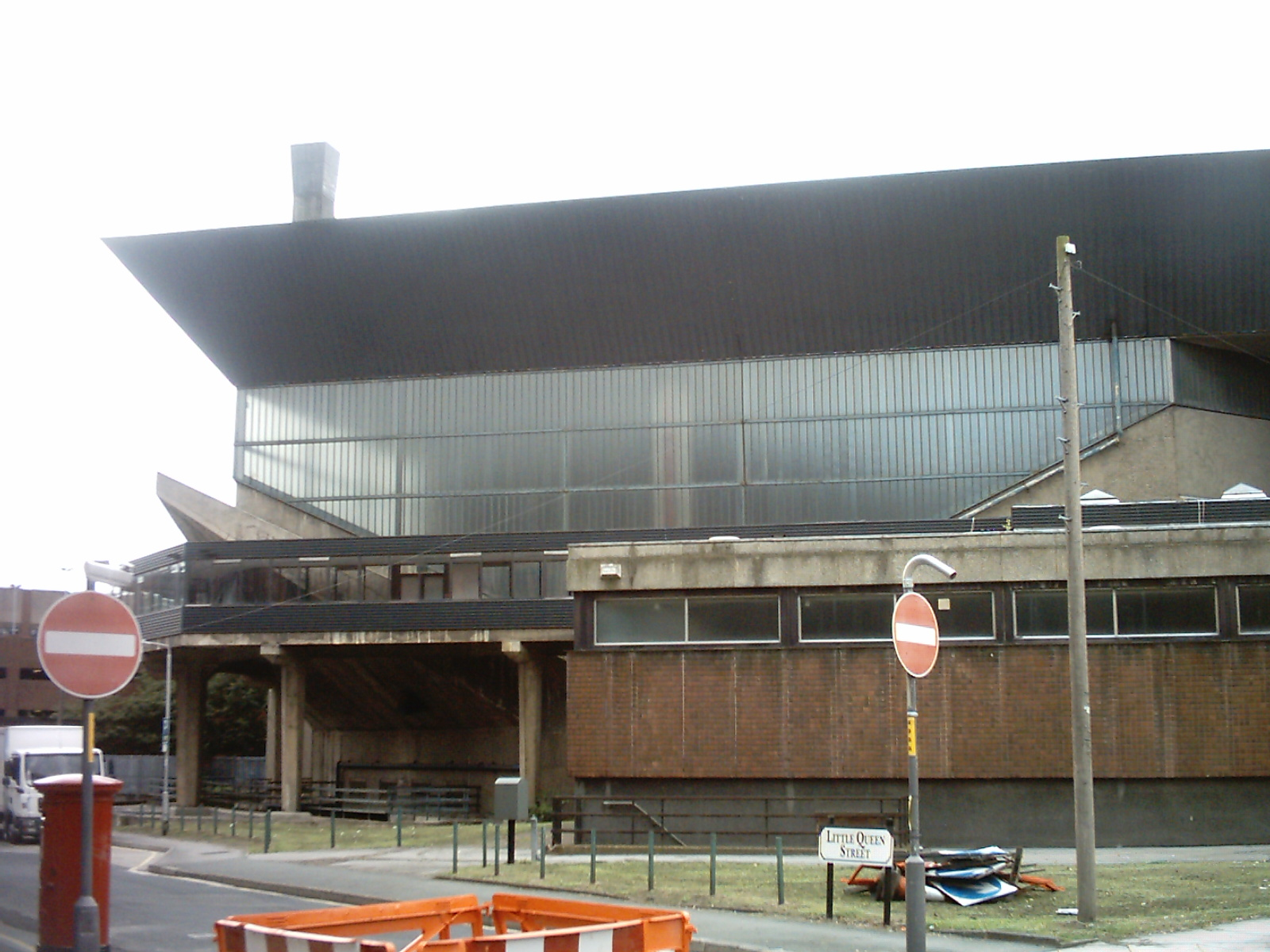
Eastern frontage of the Leeds International Pool

The Leeds International Pool often referred to as the Leeds International Baths, was a swimming facility in Leeds city centre, West Yorkshire, England. The pool was situated at the lower end of Westgate and was notable for its brutalist architecture. The pool was constructed in the 1960s and designed by architect John Poulson.

The facility closed in October 2007 and was jointly replaced by the Aquatics Centre at the John Charles Centre for Sport (former South Leeds Stadium) in the south of the city and partly by 'The Edge' sports centre at the University of Leeds which has periods open to non-university members. The building stood unused until late 2009, when demolition commenced. In the interim it was subject to vandalism.

== Controversy ==
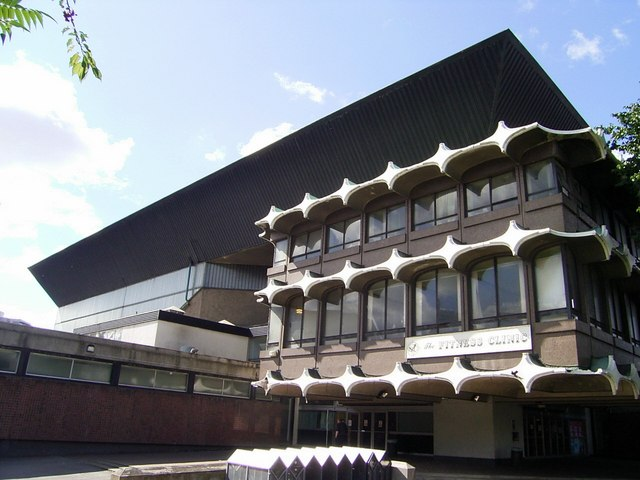
Poulson's Leeds International Swimming Pool, opened in 1966

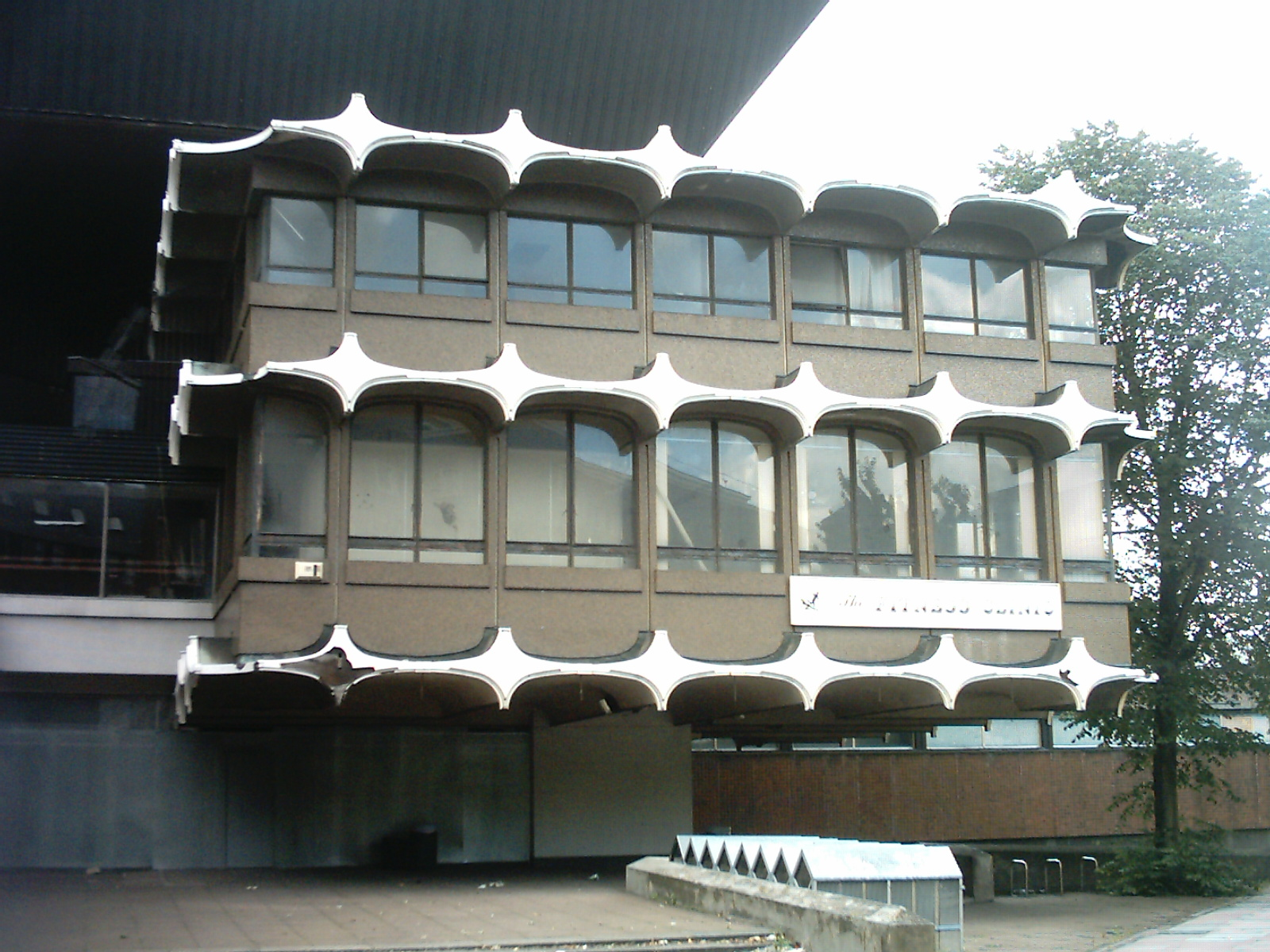
The Fitness Clinic at Leeds International Pool

The building was controversial from its opening in 1967. Although in the first six months of opening, the facilities were used by over 220,000 people (at that time nearly half the population of Leeds), the building spent many of its early days closed for repairs and alterations. The architect John Poulson was convicted in 1974 of fraud in connection with the awarding of building contracts. Other buildings designed by Poulson include the now redeveloped Cannon Street Station in London.

== Future ==
After the closure of the building, its demolition at one stage seemed unlikely after plans to build the skyscraper The Spiracle were cancelled. The building would have been difficult to convert for other uses, and the likelihood of a private company wanting to run the outdated swimming pool was unlikely, especially as Leeds by then had facilities at the John Charles Centre for Sport. However the building itself was popular, particularly with admirers of brutalism and twentieth century architecture such as the 20th Century Society.

== Replacement facilities ==
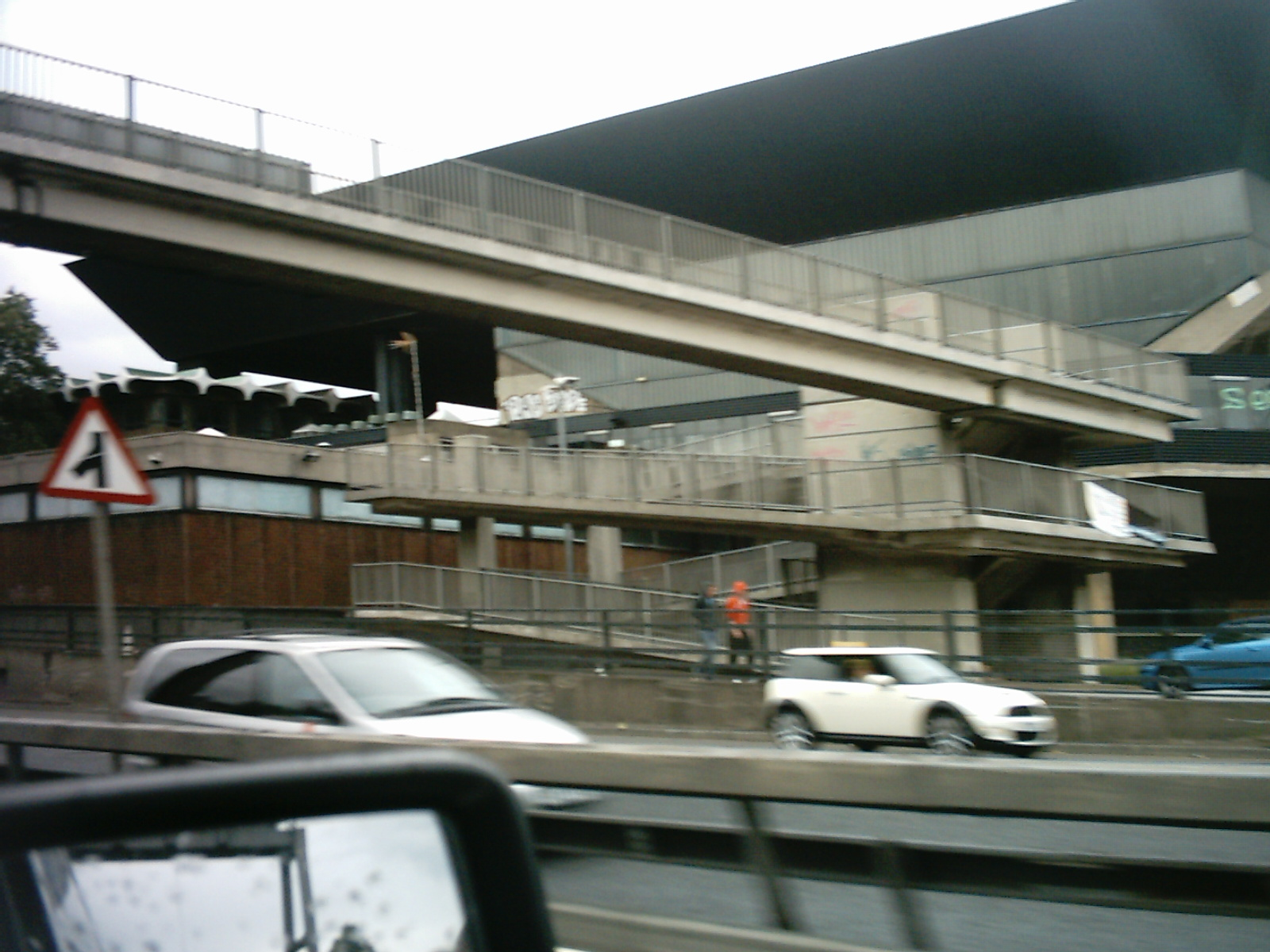
The western side of the buildings in 2008, as seen from the Leeds Inner Ring Road (A58(M)), showing the vandalism

The replacement facilities at the John Charles Centre for Sport offer a larger diving pool with a movable floor for adjusting the depth, an olympic sized pool with three booms for easy division and larger spectator areas. The new facilities adjoin an athletics and rugby league stadium, used by Hunslet Hawks, as well as indoor bowling facilities and tennis courts. The new facilities also offer ample free parking. They are however less accessible for people living in the North of Leeds and other towns within the City of Leeds such as Otley and Wetherby. The John Charles Centre for Sport, is bordered by Beeston, Hunslet and Middleton and is accessible from the M1, M62 and M621.

== Demolition ==
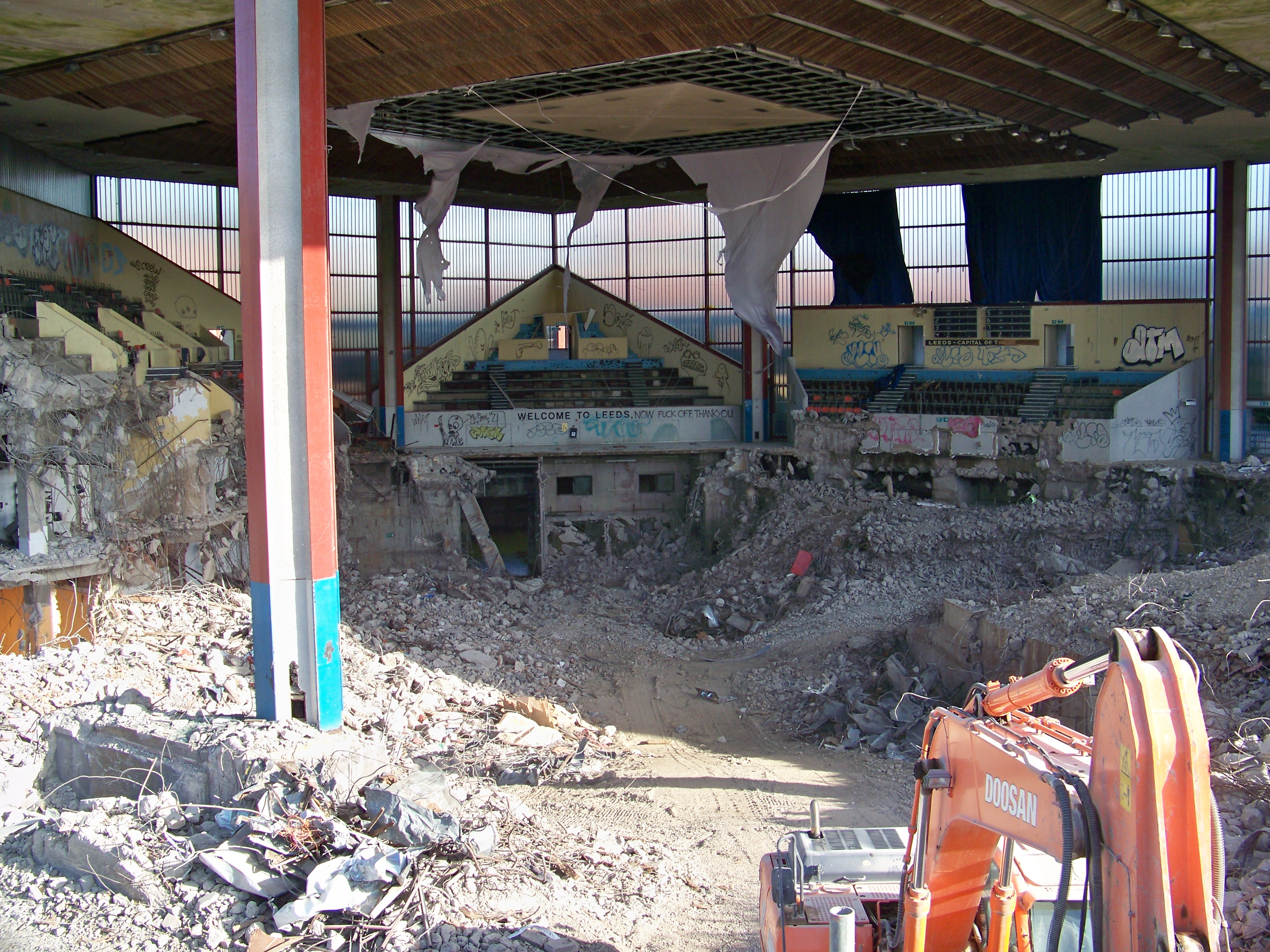
The interior of the buildings during demolition in October 2009

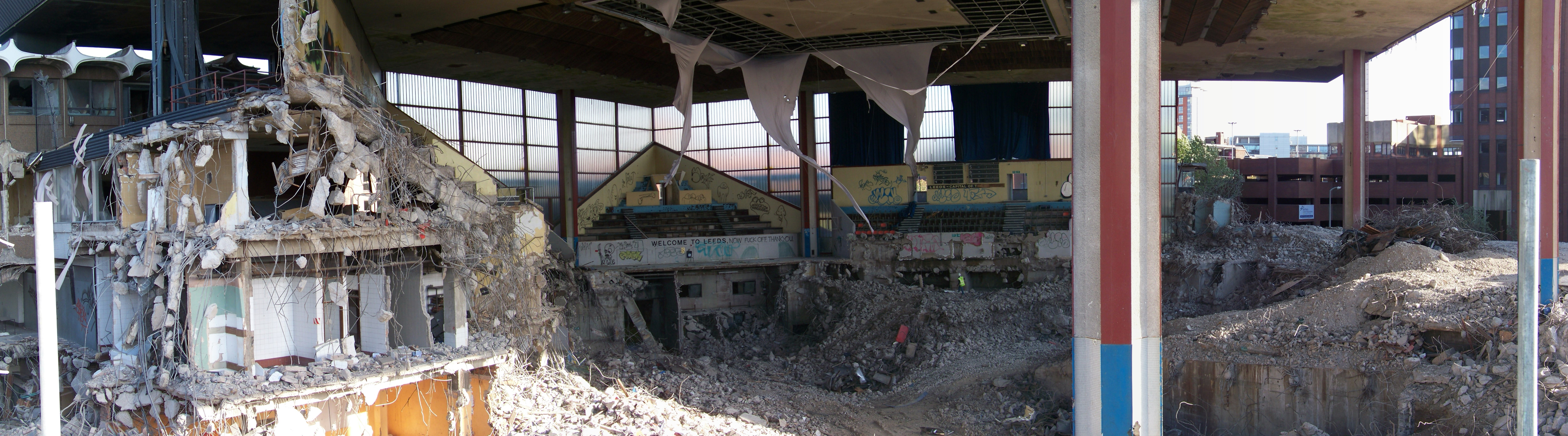
Panorama of demolition

Demolition began in the autumn of 2009. The walls to the western face of the centre were removed first, followed by the walls to the eastern side, leaving only the roof standing upon its support columns, and internal structure. These remains were subsequently demolished.

Following demolition the site had lain empty for a number of years, during which it had been operated as two surface car parks by Leeds City Council, but as of 2023 the site is undergoing high-rise redevelopment. So far one building, Threadworks, a 24-storey block of student flats, has been completed.

== See also ==
- John Charles Centre for Sport
- Leeds City Council
- John Poulson
- Sport in Leeds
- Architecture of Leeds
- Brutalism
