= UK Coaching =

UK association for sports coaches

UK Coaching is the professional association for sports coaches in the United Kingdom. It is a sports development charitable foundation.

== History ==
Until recently it was known as sports coach UK. Previously it was called the National Coaching Foundation (NCF), founded in 1983. Its motto was Better Coaching..... Better Sport.

It was incorporated as a company on 23 January 1987.

=== Origination ===
It was first sited at Leeds Polytechnic. On the organisation's committee were representatives from the British Olympic Association, the British Association of National Coaches, the Central Council of Physical Recreation and the Sports Council of Great Britain (became UK Sport in 1997). Its budget was £50,000, given by the Sports Council.

== Function ==
It disseminates knowledge and best practice for the efficient training of British sports coaches.

It provides regulation for professional conduct in sports coaching in the UK; the Sexual Offences Act 2003 does not currently apply to sports coaches. It is not a government organisation. It regulates the provision of the UK Coaching Certificate.

== Structure ==
It is headquartered in the west of Leeds, south of the B6514 in Wortley.

== UK Coaching Certificate ==
The UK Coaching Certificate (UKCC) is a recognised qualification endorsement scheme provided by UK Coaching. Its aims are to enable governing bodies of various sports across the UK to develop coaching programmes, have these programmes endorsed as being of an acceptable level of quality, and then to improve these programmes over time. As of 2014, 28 sports have at least level 1 endorsement.

== See also ==
- National Council for School Sport
- Sports Development Foundation Scotland
- Talented Athlete Scholarship Scheme
